= List of Apis mellifera subspecies =

Apis mellifera, the western honey bee, has many subspecies. The most recent taxonomic revision in 1999 recognized 28 subspecies and three additional subspecies have been described since then (Apis mellifera pomonella in 2003, Apis mellifera simensis in 2011, and Apis mellifera sinisxinyuan in 2016; see below). Other sources recognize as many as 33 subspecies.

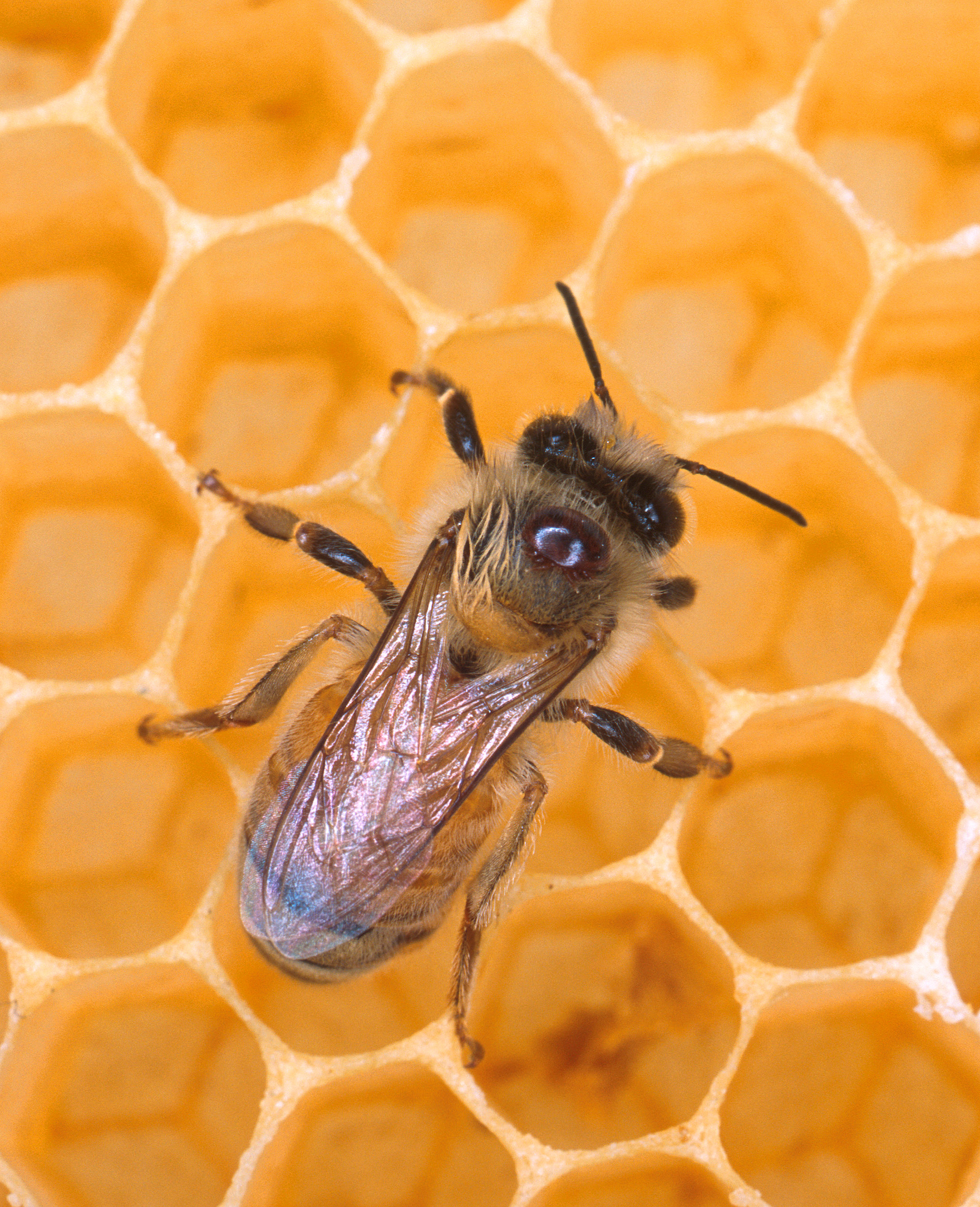
Apis mellifera

== Subspecies of Africa ==
- Apis mellifera adansonii, classified by Latreille, 1804 (the West African honey bee) found in Nigeria and Burkina Faso.
- Apis mellifera capensis, classified by Eschscholtz, 1822 (the Cape honey bee) found in southern South Africa.
- Apis mellifera intermissa, classified by von Buttel-Reepen, 1906 (the Tellian honey bee) found in the northwestern coast of Africa from Tunisia, along Libya and westerly into Morocco (north of the Atlas Mountains.
- Apis mellifera jemenitica, classified by Ruttner, 1976 (the Arabian honey bee) found in Somalia, Uganda, Sudan and Yemen.
- Apis mellifera lamarckii, classified by Cockerell, 1906 (the Egyptian honey bee) found in the Nile Valley of Egypt and Sudan, domesticated before 2600 BC. This mitotype can also be identified in honey bees from California.
- Apis mellifera litorea, classified by Smith, 1961 (the East African coastal honey bee) found in the low elevations of East Africa.
- Apis mellifera monticola, classified by Smith, 1961 (the East African mountain honey bee) found in the high altitude mountains with elevation between 1,500 and 3,100 meters of East Africa, such as (Mt. Elgon, Mt. Kilimanjaro, Mt. Kenya and Mt. Meru).
- Apis mellifera ruttneri, classified by Sheppard, Arias, Grech & Meixner in 1997 (the Maltese honey bee) endemic to the Maltese islands.
- Apis mellifera sahariensis, classified by Baldensperger, 1932 (the Saharan honey bee) found in northwestern Africa, on the southern side of the Atlas Mountains. (the existence of this subspecies has previously been questioned, possibly having been misidentified with A. m. intermissa).
- Apis mellifera scutellata, classified by Lepeletier, 1836 (the East African lowland honey bee) found in Central and East Africa; also as hybridized populations in South America, Central America and the Southern United States. In an effort to address concerns by Brazilian beekeepers and to increase honey production in Brazil, Warwick Kerr, a Brazilian geneticist, was asked by Brazilian federal and state authorities in 1956 to import several East African lowland queens from Tanzania to Piracicaba, São Paulo State in southern Brazil. Due to a mishap, some of the queens escaped. The East African lowland queens' virgin daughters mated with local European honey bee drones and produced what is now known as the Africanized honey bee in South and North America. The intense struggle for survival of western honey bees in Sub-Saharan Africa is given as the reason that this subspecies is proactive in defending the hive and also more likely to abandon an existing hive and abscond to a more secure location. They direct more of their energies to defensive behaviors and less of their energies to honey storage. East African lowland honey bees are leather-colored and difficult to distinguish by eye from the darker strains of the Italian honey bee.
- Apis mellifera simensis, classified by Meixner, Leta, Koeniger and Fuchs, 2011 (the Ethiopian honey bee) found in Ethiopia.
- Apis mellifera unicolor, classified by Latreille, 1804 (the Madagascar honey bee) endemic to the island of Madagascar.

== Subspecies of the Middle East and Asia ==
- Apis mellifera anatoliaca, classified by Maa, 1953 (the Anatolian honey bee) its range is in central Anatolia in Turkey.
- Apis mellifera caucasica, classified by Pollmann, 1889 (the Caucasian honey bee) found in the central Caucasus and towards the Turkish Black Sea coast.
- Apis mellifera cypria, classified by Pollmann, 1879 (the Cyprus honey bee) endemic to the island of Cyprus.
- Apis mellifera meda, classified by Skorikov, 1929 (the Median honey bee), more common in Iran and Iraq, but its range extends into southeastern Turkey and northern Syria.
- Apis mellifera mellifera, classified by Linnaeus, 1758 (the European dark honey bee) originating in Central Asia and migrating throughout Europe after the last ice age, having the largest geographic range of all European honey bees. It was domesticated in Europe and imported into Great Britain during Roman times and Ireland during Christian times. Hives were later exported to North America in the colonial era in 1622 where they were referred to as the English fly by the Native American Indians. In 2014-2017 a European wide survey was conducted with 621 colonies, which included the various subspecies kept by beekeepers, it found that A. m. mellifera was the most aggressive, had the highest swarming tendency and the lowest hygienic behaviour - a trait closely linked with Varroa sensitive hygiene.
- Apis mellifera pomonella, classified by Sheppard & Meixner, 2003 (the Tian Shan honey bee) endemic to the Tian Shan Mountains in Central Asia.
- Apis mellifera remipes, classified by Gerstäcker, 1862 (the Armenian honey bee) found in the region of Armenia.
- Apis mellifera sinisxinyuan, classified by C.Chen, Z.Liu, Q.Pan, X.Chen, H.Wang, H.Guo, S.Liu, H.Lu, S.Tian, R.Li and W.Shi, 2016 (the Xinyuan honey bee) discovered in 2016 in Xinjiang Uygur Autonomous Region, China, this subspecies has a range that is the farthest east known for the species.
- Apis mellifera syriaca, classified by Skorikov, 1929 (the Syrian honey bee) found between Turkey and Egypt.

== Subspecies of Europe ==
- Apis mellifera adami, classified by Friedrich Ruttner, 1975 (the Cretan honey bee) named after Brother Adam, is endemic to the island of Crete.
- Apis mellifera artemisia, classified by Engel, 1999 (the Russian steppe honey bee) located in north central Ukraine (the existence of this subspecies has recently been questioned, possibly having been misidentified).
- Apis mellifera carnica, classified by Pollmann, 1879 (the Carniolan honey bee after the Carniola region of Slovenia), originating from the Carpathian Plain, it now dominates the central / western Balkans, Austria, Germany, much of western Poland and European Turkey- popular with beekeepers due to its extreme gentleness. In 2014-2017 a European wide survey was conducted with 621 colonies, which included the various subspecies kept by beekeepers, it found that A. m. carnica was the most docile, had the lowest swarming tendency and the highest hygienic behaviour - a trait closely linked with Varroa sensitive hygiene.
- Apis mellifera cecropia, classified by Kiesenwetter, 1860 (the Greek honey bee) endemic to southern Greece, the Peloponnese region.
- Apis mellifera iberiensis, classified by Engel, 1999 (the Spanish honey bee) endemic to the Iberian Peninsula (Spain, Portugal and Gibraltar).
- Apis mellifera ligustica, classified by Spinola, 1806 (the Italian honey bee) originating from the Italian mainland south of the Alps, it is a commonly kept subspecies for commercial beekeeping in much of the world.
- Apis mellifera macedonica, classified by Ruttner, 1988 (the Macedonian honey bee) Albania, Bulgaria, Northern Greece, North Macedonia and eastwards towards Romania.
- Apis mellifera siciliana, classified by Grassi, 1881 (the Sicilian honey bee) endemic to the island of Sicily, Italy.
- Apis mellifera sossimai, classified by Engel, 1999 (the Ukrainian honey bee) located in central Ukraine (not Crimea) and towards the northern Caucasus (the existence of this subspecies has recently been questioned, possibly having been misidentified).
- Apis mellifera taurica, classified by Alpatov, 1935 (the Crimean honey bee) located in Crimea (the existence of this subspecies has recently been questioned, possibly having been misidentified).
