= Honey bee race =

Classification of honey bees

Within biological taxonomy, a honey bee race would be an informal rank in the taxonomic hierarchy, below the level of subspecies. It has been used as a higher rank than strain, with several strains making up one race. Therefore, a strain (within the honey bee context) is a lower-level taxonomic rank used at the intraspecific level within a race of a subspecies. Strains are often seen as inherently artificial concepts, more usually within biology as characterized by a specific intent for genetic isolation, however, within beekeeping circles, strain is more likely to be used to describe very minor differences throughout the same subspecies, such as the color ranges of A. m. carnica from brown to grey. Within A. m. ligustica there are two races, the darker leather brown northern Italian bee from the Ligurian Alps region which was discovered to be resistant to acarine in the 1900s, while the other Italian bee race, from regions near Bologna and further south, was highly susceptible to acarine and within this race there are two color strains, the traditional Italian yellow and a rarer all-golden color.

== Description ==
The races of the honey bee are classified into various named instances of an informal taxonomic rank of race—below that of subspecies—on the basis of shared genetic traits. The term "honey bee" means a bee of the species Apis mellifera which descend from bees that originated in Africa.

Differences in the colors of bees may be more pronounced in queens and drones; workers are much less easily differentiated by color. Drones are produced from the unfertilized eggs of queens and therefore their genetic characteristics depend entirely on those of the queen, whereas worker bees are produced from fertilized eggs. To make things even more complicated, a queen will normally mate multiple times, the spermatozoa from which are retained within her body, meaning that workers may only be half-sisters to each other, and their colors and other characteristics may differ.

In the Americas, there has been a great deal of interbreeding of subspecies, since all honey bees were imported at some point after 1492 and the subsequent Columbian Exchange. Among beekeepers, the term race has been used increasingly imprecisely, and is often used to refer to bee subspecies and hybrids, as well as subspecies divisions, more improperly.

There are also variations within subspecies (like within A. m. mellifera), being little more than color variants that may not be correlated with distinct distributions; these are sometimes referred to as native races. These are often given their own names when described, but zoological nomenclature does not recognize these named "races" as valid, as only ranks of subspecies and above have formal scientific names in zoology.

== Classifications ==
Based on morphological similarities and the separation of regions during and since the last Ice Age, there are five bee lineages:

- A (African, subspecies from central and southern Africa)
- C ("carnica", subspecies from east and south of the Alps, including those along the northern Mediterranean)
- M ("mellifera", subspecies from western Europe),
- O (Oriental, subspecies from the eastern end of the range of the species)
- Y ("yemenitica", subspecies from Ethiopia)

(Hybrids and bee breeds, even with known ancestry, such as the Buckfast bee, are not included within the bee lineages; they are crossings of the Apis mellifera subspecies and are not defined as subspecies in their own right)

The known subspecies within the lineage 'A' are:

- A. m. adansonii
- A. m. capensis
- A. m. intermissa (formerly known as A. m. major)
- A. m. jemenitica
- A. m. lamarckii
- A. m. litorea
- A. m. monticola
- A. m. ruttneri
- A. m. sahariensis
- A. m. scutellata
- A. m. unicolor

The known subspecies within the lineage 'C' are:

- A. m. carnica
- A. m. cecropia
- A. m. ligustica
- A. m. macedonica

The known subspecies within the lineage 'M' are:

- A. m. mellifera
- A. m. iberiensis (formerly known as A. m. iberica)
- A. m. sinisxinyuan

The known subspecies within the lineage 'O' are:

- A. m. adami
- A. m. anatoliaca
- A. m. armeniaca
- A. m. caucasica
- A. m. cypria
- A. m. meda
- A. m. syriaca

The known subspecies within the lineage 'Y') are:

- A. m. bandasii
- A. m. sudanensis
- A. m. yemenitica
