= Buckfast bee =

Breed of honey bee

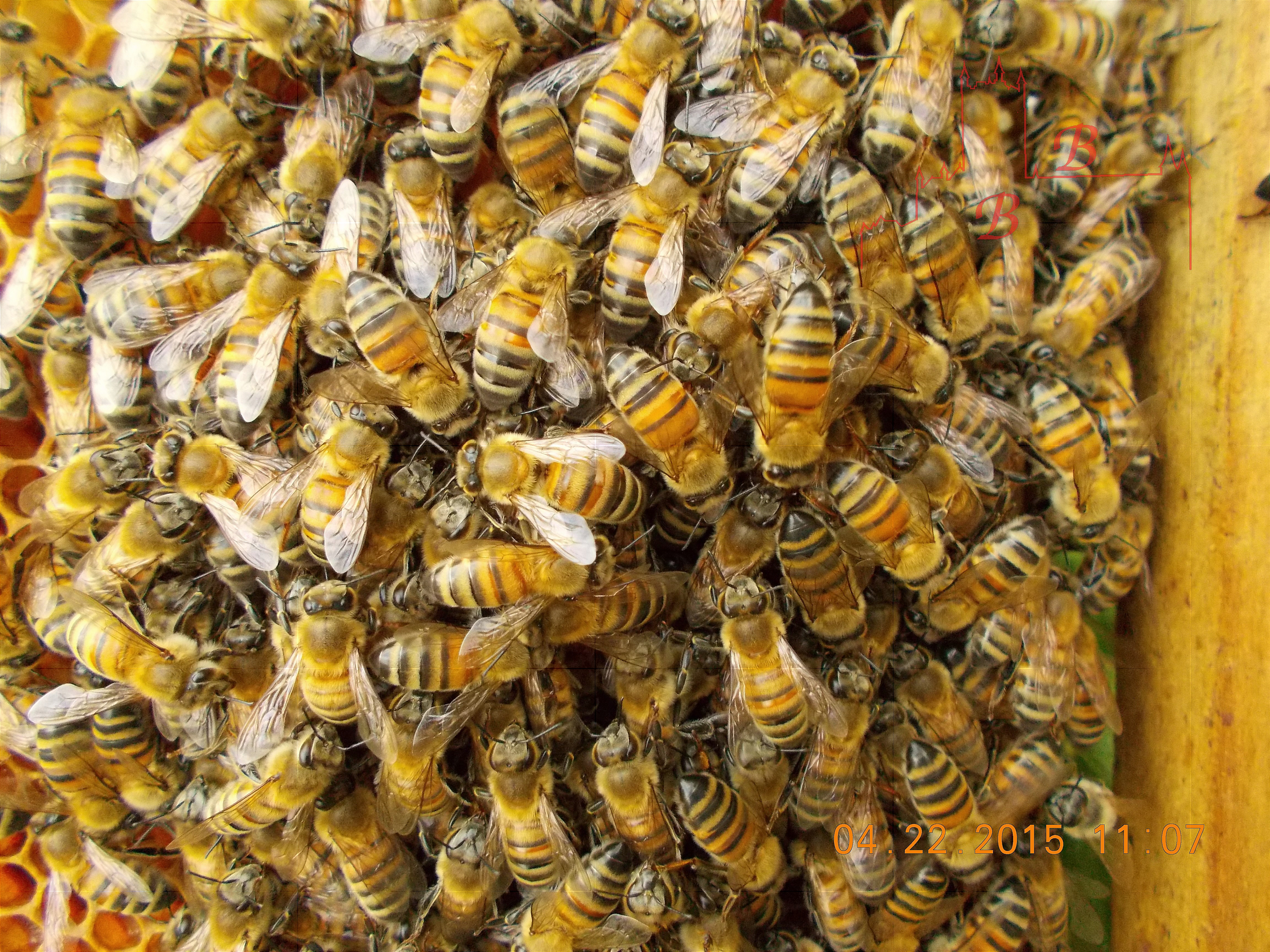
Breeder in 2015

The Buckfast bee is a breed of honey bee, a cross of many subspecies and their strains, developed by Brother Adam (born Karl Kehrle in 1898 in Germany), who was in charge of beekeeping from 1919 at Buckfast Abbey in Devon in the United Kingdom. Breeding of the Buckfast bee is now done by breeders throughout Europe belonging to the Federation of European Buckfast Beekeepers (G.D.E.B.). This organization maintains a pedigree for Buckfast bees, originating from the time of Brother Adam.

In 1916, only 16 surviving colonies were left in the abbey. All of them were either Ligurian (A. m. ligustica) from Italy or Ligurian queens mated with the English black bee (a now extinct phenotype of the A. m. mellifera); by 1919 these bees too had died causing Brother Adam to import queens again from Italy and also France, from which he began to develop what would come to be known as the Buckfast bee.

== Origin and Heritage ==
According to Brother Adam's personal notes, 1915 was "The last season colonies of the former native honeybee (the British strain of A. m. mellifera) existed in this neighbourhood before its final extermination by the Isle of Wight epidemic, in 1916 only bees of or descended from the Italian Ligurian strain of the A. m. ligustica had survived. An isolated mating station was established on Dartmoor in June 1925, prior to this date matings were random. In 1919 a queen, later named as B-1, was raised that "embodied all the desirable qualities of the Ligurian and former Native in an ideal combination"; it is from this queen that the Buckfast bees can trace their ancestry back to.

The following is a list of the subspecies (and strains if stated) that were later included in the Buckfast breeding program by Brother Adam, not all were eventually included into the Buckfast breed: Buckfast (B1), A. m. ligustica (Ligurian strain; all other strains proved susceptible to Acarine, especially those imported from the U.S. and of an all-golden color), A. m. mellifera (Gale's French, Brown Provence, Swedish and Finnish strains; the Irish strain proved itself even more susceptible to Acarine than the British strain), A. m. cypria, A. m. carnica, A. m. cecropia, A. m. meda (Iraqi and Iranian strains), A. m. sahariensis, A. m. anatoliaca (Turkish and Armenian strains), A. m. caucasica, A. m. lamarckii, A. m. monticola (Mount Elgon strain), A. m. adami and A. m. macedonica (Mount Athos strain).

In 1971 other bee breeders began to join the Buckfast breeding program and established their own isolated mating stations, as well as using instrumental insemination, today the breeding of pedigree Buckfast bees is regulated by the Federation of European Buckfast Beekeepers (G.D.E.B.) in over twenty six countries with numerous breeders.

== History ==
Its developer Brother Adam was inspired by the survival of the Italian (A. m. ligustica) × dark bee (A. m. mellifera) crosses when the Isle of Wight disease, later identified as Acarine, reached Buckfast Abbey. To be able to control the matings, he started to use an isolated valley in Dartmoor. With no other bees within range, Brother Adam could maintain their genetic integrity and develop desirable traits. Brother Adam investigated various honey bee subspecies and made many long journeys in Europe, Africa, and the Middle East, searching for desirable characteristics within local strains, he also had queens imported to include in his breeding program. The book In Search of the Best Strains of Bee tells about his travels in search of genetic building blocks.

Every new bee subspecies or strain was first crossed with the existing Buckfast bees. In many cases, the new desired qualities were passed on to the next generation and the new combination was then made stable with further breeding work. Every crossing with a new type of bee took about 10 years before the desired genes were fixed in the breed. Over 70 years, Brother Adam succeeded in developing a vigorous, healthy and fecund honey bee, which was named the Buckfast bee.

The Buckfast bee is popular among beekeepers and is available from bee breeders in Germany, Ireland, the United Kingdom, France and other places. The Buckfast bees' qualities are very favourable, sometimes referred to as the beekeepers bee. They are non-aggressive and highly productive. Brother Adam, in his book, Beekeeping at Buckfast Abbey, writes that in 1920 they obtained "an average of no less than 192 lbs [87 kg] surplus per colony and individual yields exceeding 3 cwt [= 336 lbs or 152 kg]." In the 1986 BBC-affiliated documentary, The Monk and the Honey Bee, more than 400 pounds (181 kg) of honey are reported to have been produced by a single Buckfast colony.

== Buckfast breeding programme ==
The qualities and characteristics desired in the Buckfast bee breeding can be divided into three groups: primary, secondary and tertiary.

=== Primary ===
These are the basic qualities of economic importance and form the primary aim in breeding:

- Industry – a boundless capacity for (foraging) work is doubtless the foremost requirement.
- Fecundity – the queen at a certain point (relative to the nectar flow) must be able to fill at least eight or nine Dadant combs with brood.
- Resistance to disease – is absolutely indispensable and essential to successful beekeeping.
- Disinclination to swarm – an indispensable prerequisite in modern beekeeping.

=== Secondary ===
These are of great importance as each contributes its respective share to an intensification of the honey gathering ability of the colony:

- Longevity – prolongation of the lifespan of the bee will denote a corresponding increase in the effective foraging force and capacity of a colony.
- Wing-power – the ability to forage further can prove a material factor in the performance of a colony.
- Keen sense of smell – without this a colony would not forage further, so it is closely linked with wing-power.
- Instinct of defense – this is the most effective remedy against robbing (it is not to be confused with aggression against the beekeeper).
- Hardiness and wintering ability – the ability to winter on stores of inferior quality for long periods without a cleansing flight.
- Spring development – must not occur prematurely and without the need for artificial stimulation.
- Thrift or frugality – a quality closely connected with the seasonal development of colonies.
- Instinct of self provisioning – seasonally appropriate brood chamber storage for overwintering.
- Comb building – a keenness to build comb seems to increase the zest for every form of activity of economic value.
- Gathering of pollen – not to be confused with the collecting of nectar; good quality pollen positively affects longevity.

=== Tertiary ===
These qualities help to reduce to a minimum the time and effort involved in the seasonal care and attention demanded to ensure maximum production results per colony:

- Good temper – non-aggression is a quality desired by all beekeepers. Aggression is a trait common in the M Lineage, such as the A. m. mellifera, but docility is a characteristic of the C Lineage, such as the A. m. ligustica, which the Buckfast bee is most closely related to.
- Calm behavior - bees that stay calm when they are manipulated (inspected) will greatly facilitate the work of beekeeping.
- Disinclination to propolize – excess propolis can increase the work of the beekeeper.
- Freedom from brace comb – the presence of brace comb renders the inspection and manipulation of combs not only a difficult and arduous task, but may also cause the death of the queen.
- The art of making attractive cappings – good cappings are of special importance where sections are produced, a trait which seems tied up with and dependent on many factors.
- Keen sense of orientation – helps to ensure that the bees return to their own hive, thereby avoiding the many drawbacks and risks drifting entails, and an undue loss of queens returning from their mating flights.

== Characteristics ==
=== Performance against other bees ===
Brother Adam, in comparing the Buckfast bee to the A. m. ligustica, (which the Buckfast bee is directly descended from and most closely related to) observed that it was more industrious, more thrifty, less disposed to swarm and more resistant to disease especially Acarine (tracheal mites). Compared to most subspecies of bees the Buckfast bee collects less propolis, keeps restful in winter, but builds up rapidly at the appropriate time in spring time (in England / northern Europe) and maintains a maximum effective colony strength throughout the summer, enabling full advantage of the honey flow to be taken whenever it sets in. As for temper, the Buckfast bee is unusually docile and will tolerate handling in unfavourable weather. A pure Buckfast bee will swarm, but it is little disposed to do so and, of course, it has a good reputation of an unusual honey-gathering ability.

In a scientific study in Poland from 2009 to 2010, in which the economic traits of pure Buckfast bees and a hybrid cross of A. m. mellifera and A. m. caucasia were compared, the Buckfast bee was shown to have a larger brood area, greater increase and strength in the build-up to spring, also on the last inspection of the year the Buckfast colonies were observed to be stronger as well. The honey extracted during spring and summer was larger from the Buckfast hives, with the overall honey extracted being 34.45% greater, with less variation between hives when compared to the A. m. mellifera x caucasia (NB: the crossing of two bee subspecies would have resulted in heterosis, meaning the A. m. mellifera x caucasia would have obtained better results than if the study had only used a pure subspecies, such as the A. m. mellifera or the A. m. caucasia).

In a similar scientific study, also in Poland, but in field and laboratory conditions, the foraging and hoarding abilities of three colonies were compared, 1) pure Buckfast, 2) a hybrid A. m. mellifera (from Norway) x A. m. caucasia and 3) a hybrid A. m. caucasia x A. m. carnica. The Buckfast colony collected 2.1% less syrup than the A. m. caucasia x carnica, but stored 24.8% more in stores, showing a greater efficiency in processing and less consumption of the syrup collected. The Buckfasts collected and stored 38.2% more syrup than the A. m. mellifera x caucasia.

=== Hybrid vigor to maximize yield ===
Even though the pure Buckfast bee has a claim to an unusual honey-gathering ability, returns can be maximized through hybrid vigor (heterosis) by crossing pure Buckfast, usually on the paternal side, with other subspecies. However, not all crosses will produce desirable qualities according to Brother Adam, often the swarming tendency is increased so much that it affects the honey yield. The following crosses were found to provide excellent results without increasing the swarming instinct: A. m. anatoliaca queen x Buckfast drones; Buckfast queen x A. m. carnica or A. m. cecropia drones; A. m. cecropia queen x Buckfast or A. m. carnica drones. But the following was found to maximize the swarming instinct: A. m. mellifera or A. m. intermissa or A. m. carnica queens x Buckfast drones.

=== Varroa resistance of different Buckfast strains ===
In a study conducted by Oddie, Dahle and Neumann a Norwegian originally buckfast strain was discovered to be varroa resistant. In Finland (Lundén Apiaries) and Sweden (Österlund Apiaries) there are buckfast strains confirmed to be varroa resistant by other breeders.

=== Varroa sensitive hygiene ===
A breeding project was begun in the Netherlands in 2014 by Stichting Arista Bee Research, with the goal of producing a Varroa-resistant bee, by using Single Drone Insemination to enhance the Varroa Sensitive Hygiene (VSH) behavior. By importing semen in 2013 from VSH colonies in the U.S., they worked with Buckfast beekeepers from Belgium, Luxembourg, Germany, France and the Netherlands and were able to produce colonies that were completely Varroa-resistant without the use of any treatments. Although the genetic base of this Buckfast VSH strain is very narrow, as selection has only been limited to this trait and no resources have been available yet to structurally integrate it into the broader population, it has shown that VSH behavior is present in European high quality Buckfast breeding stock and can be brought to high percentages, the next step in the breeding program will be to further select toward 100% VSH in the entire EU breeding stock. In 2018 it was announced that varroa resistant Buckfast bees (daughters of VSH open mated Queens) would be made available for sale in 2019.
