= Apis mellifera siciliana =

Scientific classification
- Kingdom: Animalia
- Phylum: Arthropoda
- Class: Insecta
- Order: Hymenoptera
- Family: Apidae
- Genus: Apis
- Species: A. mellifera
- Subspecies: A. m. siciliana

Trinomial name
- Apis mellifera siciliana Engel 1999

Synonyms
- Apis siciliana (Grassi 1881); Apis siciliana (Dalla Torre 1896); Apis mellifica mellifica variety siziliana (Buttel-Reepen 1906); Apis mellifera sicula (Montagano 1911)

Subspecies of honey bee

Apis mellifera siciliana is known by the common name of the Sicilian honey bee which is endemic to the island of Sicily, Italy in the Mediterranean sea. It belongs to the A Lineage of honey bees from Africa, with close genetic relations to Apis mellifera sahariensis, Apis mellifera intermissa, and Apis mellifera ruttneri.

In 2014 DNA analysis estimated that 39.1% of the islands bees were introgressed with DNA from the M Lineage (most likely the Apis mellifera mellifera) and the C Lineage (most likely the Apis mellifera ligustica, Apis mellifera carnica or the Buckfast bee), however the islands of Vulcano and Filicudi, which are conservation areas for the A. m. siciliana showed no signs of introgression, demonstrating their effectiveness at protecting and preserving the subspecies.
