= Apis mellifera iberiensis =

Scientific classification
- Kingdom: Animalia
- Phylum: Arthropoda
- Clade: Pancrustacea
- Class: Insecta
- Order: Hymenoptera
- Family: Apidae
- Genus: Apis
- Species: A. mellifera
- Subspecies: A. m. iberiensis

Trinomial name
- Apis mellifera iberiensis Engel, 1999

Western honey bee subspecies native to the Iberian Peninsula

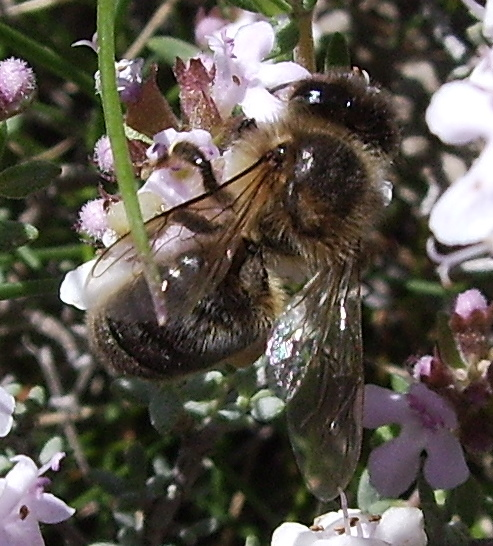
Bee (Apis mellifera) over Thymus vulgaris, Castelltallat, Catalonia

Apis mellifera iberiensis, or the Spanish bee, is a western honey bee subspecies native to the Iberian Peninsula. It is also found on the Balearic Islands.

== Distribution ==
This subspecies is well characterized towards the south and west of a line passing from Zaragoza to Barcelona in the Iberian Peninsula, belonging to the A lineage of Apis mellifera originating from Africa (formally mis-identified as belonging to the M Lineage originating from central Asia), colonizing Iberia across the Strait of Gibraltar.

== Morphology ==
Apis mellifera iberiensis have a length of the forewings with an average of 9.226 mm and 3.098 mm while the width of the subspecies Apis mellifera mellifera is 9.381 mm and 3.0293 mm respectively. The first description of this bee of the Iberian Peninsula was published in the magazine Bee World, made by B. Adam. Ruttner described it in his book "Biogeography and Taxonomy of Honeybees." in base to the description of Adam, but like several authors prior to him (e.g., Goetze, 1964) erroneously equated this bee with the subspecies proposed by Skorikov (1929) as Apis mellifera iberica (Skorikov, however, proposed the name for a subspecies occurring in the Caucasus and based the name on the ancient Greco-Roman designation for the Georgian Kingdom, Caucasian Iberians, existing there in antiquity). Thus, the name as employed by Ruttner was an error, leaving Apis mellifera iberiensis as the only valid name for this subspecies of honey bees. Adam collected his observations on a trip he made to Spain and Portugal in 1959.

Apis m. iberiensis has the body size of European subspecies with forewings narrower and wider abdomen. It is mostly dark brown to jet-black. The darkness is accentuated by the low tomentum and low hairiness. The queens are black almost uniform in color. They are prolific and with high fertility controlled by environmental conditions. The closing membrane of the cells is watery, the breeding is sensitive to some diseases.

== Behavior ==
They do not typically generate multiple queens (polygyny) in any given hive at swarming time. Their movements are fast and rather nervous. They exhibit quick defensive reaction, nervousness, and a propensity to swarm. They do make abundant use of propolis. One or two sentry bees are always present at the entrance of the hive. If the colony is disturbed, the sentries raise a persistent alarm. The hive attack anything that seems threatening for at least 24 hours.

== Taxonomy ==
The name often applied to this subspecies is A. m. iberica, an epithet originally proposed by Skorikov in his 1929 monograph on honey bees. Authors subsequent to Skorikov assumed in error that the iberica referred to the Iberian Peninsula and thereby quickly adopted the name for the subspecies of bees living in Spain and bordering areas. However, the name iberica was based on a Caucasian subspecies of honey bees, the epithet referring to the Greco-Roman designation for the Georgian Kingdom established in that region in antiquity. The true A. m. iberica of Skorikov has nothing to do with the western Mediterranean subspecies of bees, and under the rules of nomenclature the name iberica is not valid for this lineage of honey bees. The corrected and valid name for the subspecies is Apis mellifera iberiensis.

In a comparative study of A. m. iberiensis and five others subspecies of Apis mellifera including A. m. intermissa, A. m. monticola, A. m. scutellata, A. m. adansonii and A. m. capensis, cleavage maps obtained through the use of restriction enzymes showed the Spanish Honey bee contains mitochondrial DNA (mtDNA) similar to that in the subspecies intermissa and mellifera. Additionally, A. m. intermissa belongs to a group including the subspecies monticola, scuttelata, adansonii and capensis, with which it shares sequence similarities in the mtDNA.

In Spanish bee populations, mtDNA haplotypes of African bee strains were found to be frequently present. Migrating bee populations formed the original colonies of bee in western Europe, landing to eventually populate the continent from Africa across the Straits of Gibraltar.

== Genome ==
The Iberian Peninsula is an area of genetically mixed lineage between the north western Africa and south western Europe, the genetic ancestry of Apis mellifera mellifera is present in bees localized in the north, while the Apis mellifera intermissa is more present in the south.

A. m. iberiensis DNA is present in the honey bees of the western United States where the honey bees are not native and they were introduced from Spain during the conquest of America.

Twenty different haplotypes were identified in Iberia, twelve of them correspond to the evolutionary A Lineage from Africa and thirteen from the M Lineage from north western Europe but originating in central Asia. From this, the genetically mixed lineage of A. m. iberiensis is inferred, which has a predominant influence in the south of the Iberian Peninsula, with a north African component that is gradually replaced towards the north with A. m. mellifera.

The genetic variability of the microsatellite of the chromosomes, is similar to that of African populations in the number of alleles detected and the values of genetic diversity. This suggests the genetic relationship between populations of Andalusia and North Africa.

Studied be populations of Portugal there were no major differences between different geographical locations. Morphometric studies of Apis mellifera iberiensis populations in Asturias and northern Iberian Peninsula indicated that the Cantabrian Mountains produces insulation allowing for differences between populations.

The results of microsatellites vary markedly between provinces. In Cádiz haplotype homogeneity contrasts with the microsatellite variability, suggesting the occurrence of recent phenomena of introgression from populations with African haplotypes, whose origin is indeterminate.
