= Varroa sensitive hygiene =

Type of animal behavior

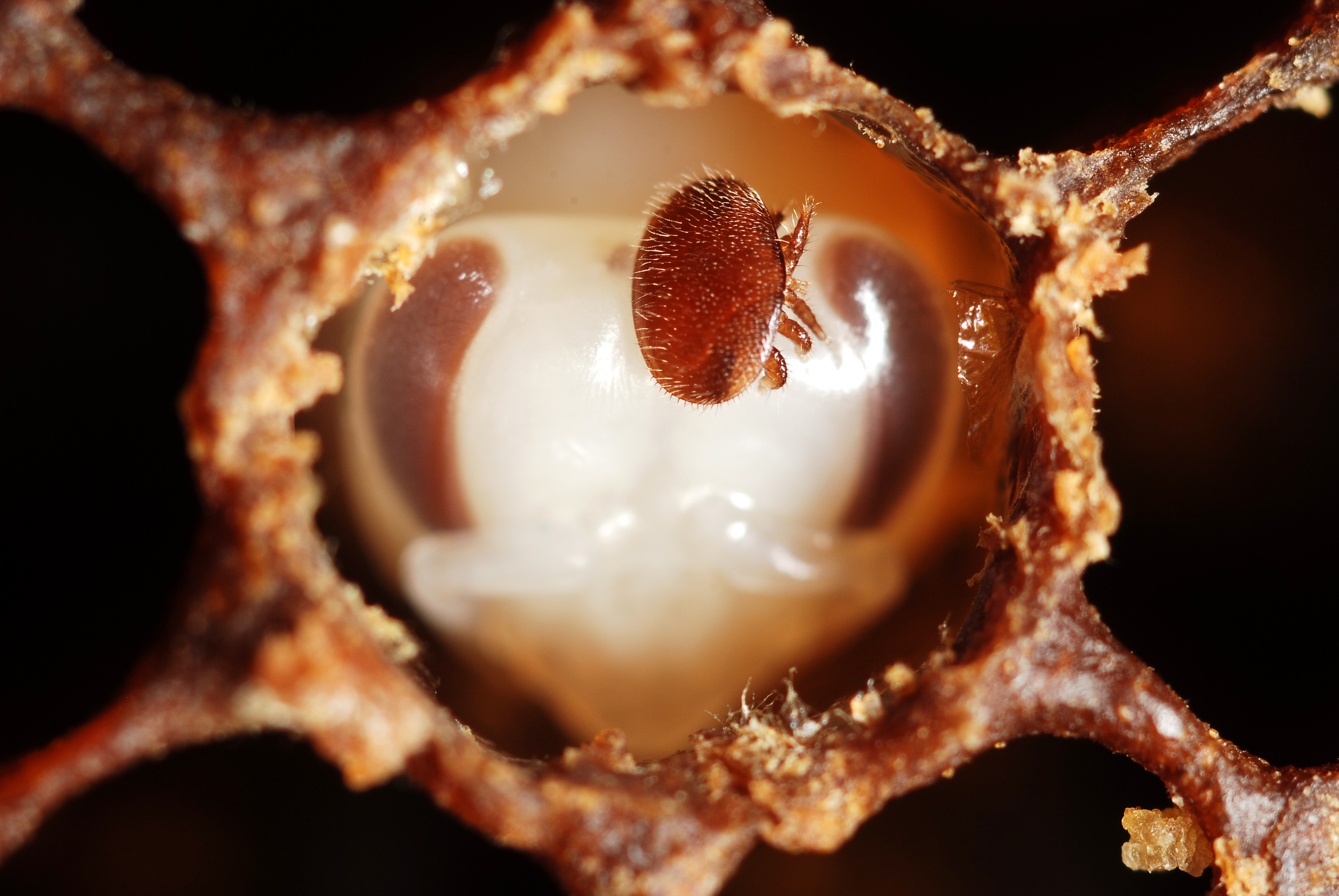
Varroa destructor on the head of bee pupa.

Varroa sensitive hygiene (VSH) is a behavioral trait of honey bees (Apis mellifera) in which bees detect and remove bee pupae that are infested by the parasitic mite Varroa destructor. V. destructor is considered to be the most dangerous pest problem for honey bees worldwide. VSH activity results in significant resistance to the mites.

== Subspecies with Varroa sensitive hygiene ==
Some subspecies of Apis mellifera show naturally Varroa sensitive hygiene, for example Apis mellifera lamarckii and Apis mellifera carnica.

== Development ==
Bees with the VSH trait were initially bred by the United States Department of Agriculture Honey Bee Breeding, Genetics and Physiology Laboratory in Baton Rouge, Louisiana, from colonies in which mite populations grew only slowly.

The factor causing slow mite population growth was found to be heritable. The rate of mite population growth was found to be correlated with the reproductive rates of mites, resulting in naming the factor "suppressed mite reproduction" (SMR). It was later discovered that the factor is founded on hygienic activity of adult bees, so SMR was renamed VSH. The behavior involves nest cleaning bees recognizing infested brood aged 15–18 days old (emergence occurs at 21 days old). Mite-infested bee pupae are removed from their brood cells, which kills any immature varroa mites present.

VSH activity results in (1) an abnormally low proportion of mites that produce offspring within the population that remains in capped brood and (2) reducing the brood infestation rate by greater than 70%. The specifics of how hygienic bees detect mite infested brood currently are unknown.

== Cross-breeding ==
Bees bred to have high levels of VSH can keep mite populations below thresholds recommended for Varroa treatment including miticides. Queens from such VSH breeding sources can be allowed to mate freely with non-VSH drones, and the resulting hybrid colonies from these outcrosses will retain lower and variable but generally still useful resistance to V. destructor while retaining desirable beekeeping traits such as honey production.

VSH outcrossed to commercial Italian bees recently have been shown to perform well in migratory crop pollination.

VSH thus is a trait that can be used by breeders to mix with any type of desirable honey bee and is expanding resistance to V. destructor among diverse bee strains. In 2018 it was announced that VSH Buckfast bees would be made available for sale in 2019.
