= Apis mellifera simensis =

Scientific classification
- Kingdom: Animalia
- Phylum: Arthropoda
- Class: Insecta
- Order: Hymenoptera
- Family: Apidae
- Genus: Apis
- Species: A. mellifera
- Subspecies: A. m. simensis

Trinomial name
- Apis mellifera simensis Meixner, Leta, Koeniger, Fuchs 2011

Synonyms
- Apis mellifera bandasii Mogga 1988; Apis mellifera woyi-gambella Amssalu 2004

Subspecies of honey bee

Apis mellifera simensis is known by the common name of the Ethiopian honey bee, discovered in 2011 through DNA analysis, which directly contradicted previous researchers which had misidentified the honey bees of Ethiopia, attributing them to neighboring subspecies in eastern Africa, in part due to similar Morphometrics. A. m. simensis was found to deviate substantially from other Apis mellifera when genetically analysed, in that a new Y Lineage branch of the Apis mellifera was created for them: There had previously thought to be up to five different subspecies within Ethiopia.

They are larger than most honey bees of Africa, only slightly smaller than the Egyptian Apis mellifera lamarckii to the north, and slightly larger than the Apis mellifera monticola to the south; however, they have much longer and broader wings typical of larger honey bees. They are usually very dark, like the A. m. monticola, occasionally with some pigmentation, and also like the A. m. monticola, they have relatively longer hair.

They are typically found in the mountain ranges of Ethiopia, covering the northern and central areas of the country; only the A. m. simensis was detected throughout Ethiopia; samples were collected from the greater part of the country.

== Etymology ==
The name simensis is taken from the Simien Mountains, a dominant mountain range in northern Ethiopia and a World Heritage Site. A previously attempted naming by Mogga in 1988 of Apis mellifera bandasii and Apis mellifera woyi-gambella by Amssalu in 2004 were both determined to be nomina nuda according to the ICZN rules. In 2022, research was conducted within Ethiopia on A. m. simensis mistakenly referred to as Apis mellifera bandasii.
