= Apis mellifera pomonella =

Scientific classification
- Kingdom: Animalia
- Phylum: Arthropoda
- Class: Insecta
- Order: Hymenoptera
- Family: Apidae
- Genus: Apis
- Species: A. mellifera
- Subspecies: A. m. pomonella

Trinomial name
- Apis mellifera pomonella Sheppard & Meixner, 2003

Subspecies of honey bee

Apis mellifera pomonella, the Tien Shan honey bee, is a subspecies of Apis mellifera which is claimed to be the endemic honey bee of the Tien Shan Mountains in Central Asia. It is a relatively large bee, only slightly smaller than Apis mellifera carnica, in general very similar in appearance to Apis mellifera anatoliaca, but with comparatively short hair and short mouthparts.

== Etymology ==
The name "pomonella" proposed by the researchers is derived from the Roman goddess Pomona, the protector of gardens, fruit trees and orchards, associated with the flourishing of the fruit, not its harvesting. The name Pōmōna in turn comes from the Latin word pōmus meaning fruit tree or fruit. The region of the Tien Shan Mountain range is near the former Kazakhstan capital, Almaty, previously called Alma-Ata which means the “father of apples”; this area has been described as a "center of diversity" for wild Malus species, Malus sieversii (wild apples), which our apple cultivars are descended from. Apples are self-incompatible and require insect pollination which is typically provided by honey bees when grown as a commercial crop.
