= Apis mellifera remipes =

Scientific classification
- Kingdom: Animalia
- Phylum: Arthropoda
- Class: Insecta
- Order: Hymenoptera
- Family: Apidae
- Genus: Apis
- Species: A. mellifera
- Subspecies: A. m. remipes

Trinomial name
- Apis mellifera remipes Gerstäcker 1862

Synonyms
- Apis mellica remipes Gerstäcker 1862; Apis eurasiatica Skorikov 1929; Apis remipes transcaucasica Skorikov 1929; Apis remipes transcaucasica variety absuana Skorikov 1929; Apis remipes transcaucasica variety iberica Skorikov 1929; Apis remipes armeniaca Skorikov 1929; Apis mellifera remipes variety absuatua Skorikov 1929; Apis mellifera remipes variety siganica Skorikov 1929; Apis mellifera remipes variety georgica Skorikov 1929; Apis mellifera armeniaca Skorikov 1929; Apis mellifera mingrelica Lavrezhin 1935

Subspecies of honey bee

Apis mellifera remipes is known by the common name of the Armenian honey bee and is reported to occur in the region of Armenia, however numerous names have been assigned to honey bees within this area leading to considerable confusion as to the correct name which should be used. There has also been doubts raised as to whether the A. m. remipes has been misidentified, and is not actually the A. m. anatoliaca to the west.

A research paper published in 2010, conducted in the Kars region of Turkey, using morphometric analysis to identify the honey bees in their samples, lists the A. m. remipes as a "trans-Caucasian race" while also listing a synonym used for the A. m. remipes, the Apis mellifera armeniaca but describing it as the "Armenian race", treating the two names as two separate subspecies. The study described the A. m. remipes as a bee living in the low lands and containing notable yellow coloration in contrast to the other bees in the area such as the Apis mellifera anatoliaca and the Apis mellifera caucasica.
