= Slavonian honey =

Croatian honey

- Type: honey
- Region or state: Slavonia
- Associated cuisine: Croatian

Slavonian honey (Croatian: Slavonski med) is a specific type of honey producued in the Slavonia region of Croatia. As a food product, it is protected by a designation of geographical origin at the level of the European Union.

== Characteristics ==
By the production method, it is honey in the honeycomb, honey with honeycomb or parts of the honeycomb, and honey drawn, and includes:

- Acacia honey
- Linden honey
- Rapeseed honey
- Sunflower honey
- Chestnut honey
- Flower honey
- Malted oak honey.

The percentage of water is a maximum of 18.3%, while the amount of hydroxymethylfurfural is a maximum of 16.5 mg/kg. Also specific is the presence of pollen from the Brassicaceae, Robinia spp. and Rosaceae in Slavonian honey, as accompanying pollen (at least 16%) or secondary pollen (at most 15%). It is produced by native "gray bees" (Apis mellifera carnica) of the Pannonian subtype.

== Production ==
It has been produced commercially since the 1980s. Honey is produced in Vukovar-Srijem, Osijek-Baranja, Požega-Slavonia, Brod-Posavina and Virovitica-Podravina County.

The production area includes the entire Slavonic region, located in the northeastern part of Croatia, bordered by three rivers, the Drava in the north (border with Hungary), the Sava in the south (border with Bosnia and Herzegovina) and the Danube in the east (border with Serbia) and part of the Hungarian-Croatian border between the Drava and Danube rivers. The western part of the Slavonic border covers the area of the western administrative border of the Bjelovar-Bilogora County and the municipalities of Lipovljani and Jasenovac and the city of Novska. All stages of the production are carried out in this area.

== Protection ==
The Association of Slavonic honey producers (Udruga proizvođača Slavonskog meda) from Virovitica initiated the national procedure for the protection of the name "Slavonski med" as a protected mark of authenticity in 2015, and in 2016 the name "Slavonski med" was protected in the Republic of Croatia.

The request for registration of the name "Slavonski med" at the level of the European Union was sent to the European Commission in September 2016. Protection was granted by the implementing regulation 2018/95 on 9 January 2018 of the European Commission.
