= Apis mellifera taurica =

Scientific classification
- Kingdom: Animalia
- Phylum: Arthropoda
- Class: Insecta
- Order: Hymenoptera
- Family: Apidae
- Genus: Apis
- Species: A. mellifera
- Subspecies: A. m. taurica

Trinomial name
- Apis mellifera taurica (Alpatov 1935 & 1938)

Subspecies of honey bee

Apis mellifera taurica (common name the Crimean honey bee) along the north central shores of the Black Sea, in the Crimea. However in 2011 research from Russia questioned the taxonomic status of A. m. taurica citing mtDNA analysis to the north and west of Crimea, which had shown that those regions did not have distinct subspecies, but that their honey bees were at the most ecotypes of previously known subspecies.
