= Apis mellifera jemenitica =

Scientific classification
- Kingdom: Animalia
- Phylum: Arthropoda
- Class: Insecta
- Order: Hymenoptera
- Family: Apidae
- Genus: Apis
- Species: A. mellifera
- Subspecies: A. m. jemenitica

Trinomial name
- Apis mellifera jemenitica Ruttner, 1976

Synonyms
- Apis mellifera yemenitica Engel, 1999

Subspecies of bee

The Apis mellifera jemenitica (Arabian or Nubian honey bee) is a subspecies of the western honey bee. It is native to the southern Arabian Peninsula, south of the Sahara, Sudan and Somalia. Based on morphological studies by Friedrich Ruttner, it is classified as a tropical African bee group.

== Description ==
Apis mellifera jemenitica is quite small and stocky of shape. The color of the abdomen of the workers shows one to three yellow rings, the yellow coloration is alternately extended. Apis mellifera jemenitica is adapted to the extreme domestic temperatures and forms relatively small colonies.

== See also ==
- Subspecies of Apis mellifera
