= Apis mellifera artemisia =

Scientific classification
- Kingdom: Animalia
- Phylum: Arthropoda
- Class: Insecta
- Order: Hymenoptera
- Family: Apidae
- Genus: Apis
- Species: A. mellifera
- Subspecies: A. m. artemisia

Trinomial name
- Apis mellifera artemisia Engel 1999

Synonyms
- Apis mellifera mellifera variety tesquorum (Skorikov 1929), Apis mellifera acervorum (Skorikov 1929)

Subspecies of honey bee

Apis mellifera artemisia is the Russian steppe honey bee, first identified in 1999 near Kyiv, Ukraine, by only one specimen, but by 2011 its taxonomic status had been called into question, although to date no DNA analysis has been conducted: At the same time the taxonomic status of the Apis mellifera ruttneri on Malta was also called into question, however in 2017 it was confirmed that Apis mellifera ruttneri was a new and separate subspecies.

Its name is derived from Artemis the Greek goddess for whom the honey bee was a symbol and whose temple at Ephesus, the Artemision, was listed as one of the Seven Wonders of the world.
