= Apis mellifera litorea =

Scientific classification
- Kingdom: Animalia
- Phylum: Arthropoda
- Class: Insecta
- Order: Hymenoptera
- Family: Apidae
- Genus: Apis
- Species: A. mellifera
- Subspecies: A. m. litorea

Trinomial name
- Apis mellifera litorea Smith, 1961

Subspecies of honey bee

Apis mellifera litorea (East African coastal honey bee) is a subspecies of the Western honey bee with a narrow coastal range mainly on the plains of Mozambique, it belongs to the A (Africa) Lineage of honey bees.

== Habitat ==
The native habitat of A. m. litorea extends northwards along the narrow coastal plain of Kenya and Tanzania, and southwards towards the plains of Mozambique.

== Appearance ==
It is a yellow bee, visually similar to its westerly neighbor the A. m. scutellata except for it much smaller size. However relative to its body and leg sizes it has a long proboscis.

== Behavior ==
Due to its smaller size, it builds small cells averaging only 4.62mm wide, with comb spacing ranging from 28-30mm. Its natural coastal range has a nearly continual nectar flow, resulting in brood being reared throughout most of the year. However in periods of dearth it will readily abscond when stores are exhausted.

Absconding can also be triggered by the colony coming under attack from the wasp Palarus latifrons (Bee Pirate).
