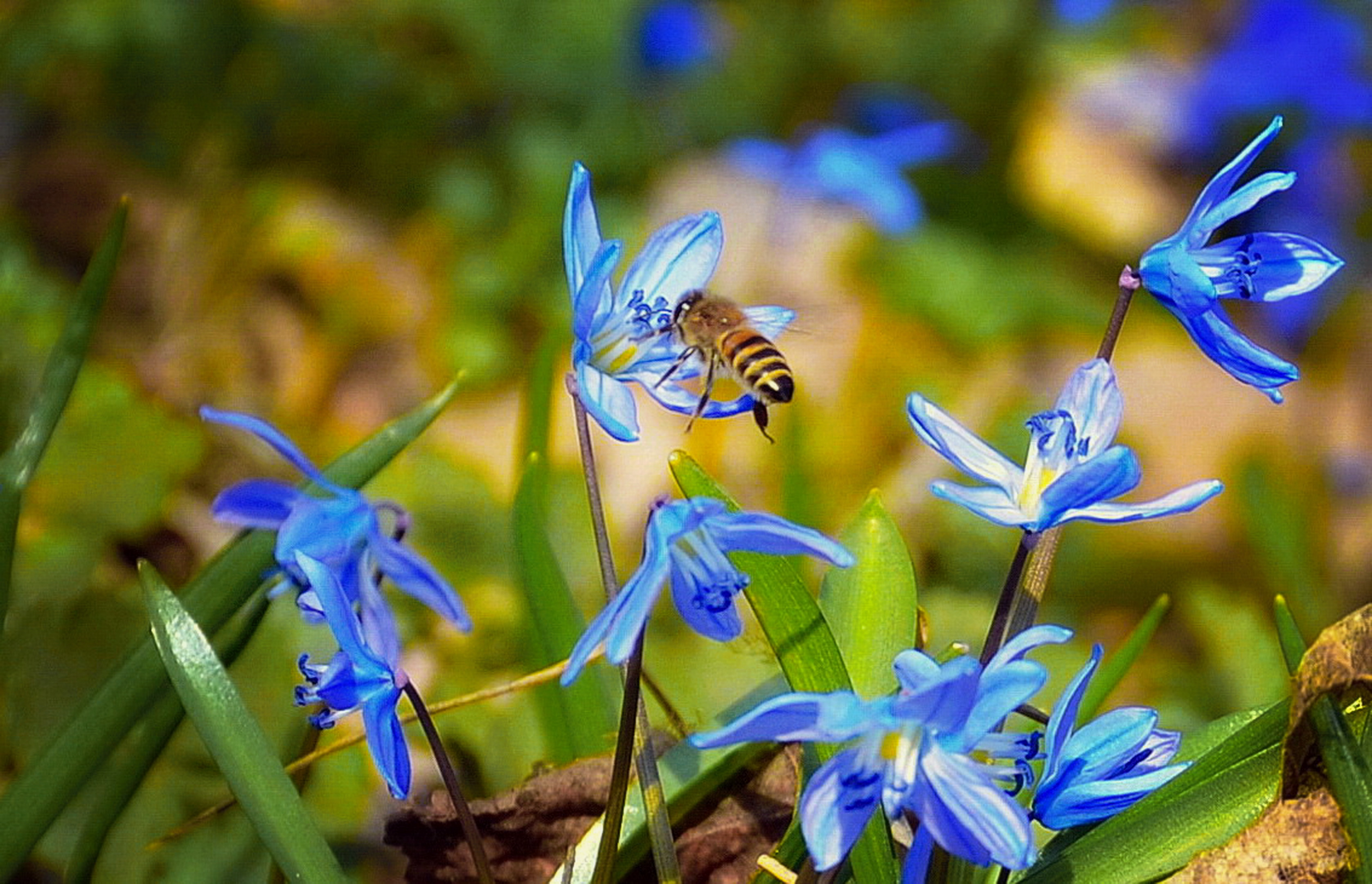

Scientific classification
- Kingdom: Animalia
- Phylum: Arthropoda
- Class: Insecta
- Order: Hymenoptera
- Family: Apidae
- Genus: Apis
- Species: A. mellifera
- Subspecies: A. m. sossimai

Trinomial name
- Apis mellifera sossimai Engel 1999

Synonyms
- Apis cerifera (Gerstäcker 1862, previously Scopoli 1770),

= Apis mellifera sossimai =

Subspecies of honey bee

Apis mellifera sossimai (common name the Ukrainian honey bee) extending from the west of Ukraine centrally and southwards towards the Caucasus mountains. However in 2011 research from Ukraine conducted mtDNA analysis showing that the A. m. sossimai was not a separate subspecies, but only an ecotype of the Apis mellifera macedonica subspecies.

Its name is derived from St.Zosimas of Solovki, patron Saint of beekeeping in Ukraine.
