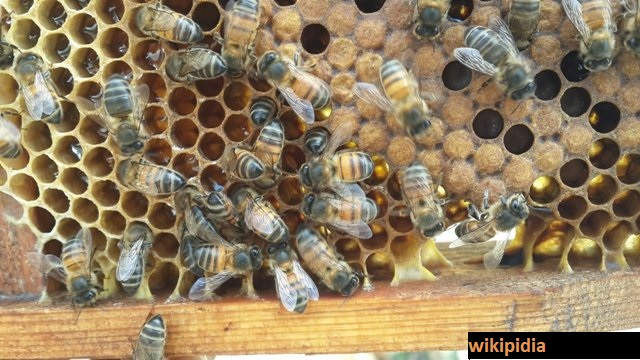

Scientific classification
- Kingdom: Animalia
- Phylum: Arthropoda
- Class: Insecta
- Order: Hymenoptera
- Family: Apidae
- Genus: Apis
- Species: A. mellifera
- Subspecies: A. m. sahariensis

Trinomial name
- Apis mellifera sahariensis (Baldensperger, 1932)

= Apis mellifera sahariensis =

Subspecies of honey bee

Apis mellifera sahariensis is a North African bee subspecies of the species Apis mellifera. It is closely related to Apis mellifera intermissa in the region.

Apis mellifera sahariensis is native to Sahara desert oasis habitats. This bee type adapted to the date palm (Phoenix dactylifera) and other Saharan flora.

Saharan honeybee subspecies is adapted to extreme temperatures ($-10$°C to over 50°C), drought, and high altitudes. Researchers have sequenced its first complete mitochondrial genome using the Illumina HiSeq platform to enhance knowledge of bee phylogeny and mitogenomes.

== See also ==
- Subspecies of Apis mellifera
