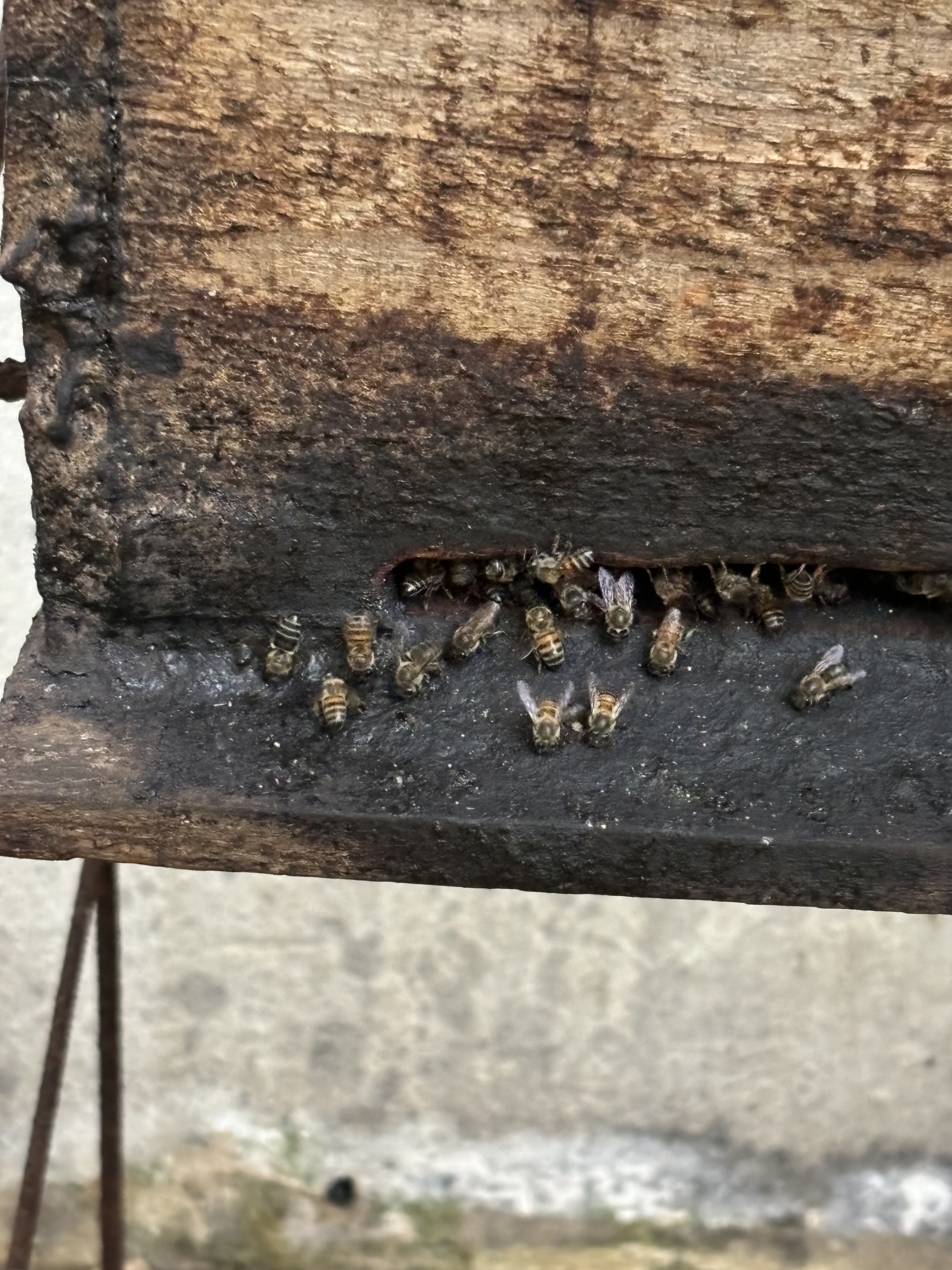
- Apis mellifera unicolor in a man-made hive

Scientific classification
- Kingdom: Animalia
- Phylum: Arthropoda
- Class: Insecta
- Order: Hymenoptera
- Family: Apidae
- Genus: Apis
- Species: A. mellifera
- Subspecies: A. m. unicolor

Trinomial name
- Apis mellifera unicolor Latreille 1804

= Apis mellifera unicolor =

Subspecies of honey bee

Apis mellifera unicolor is known by the common name of the Madagascar honey bee, sometimes also called the Malagasy honey bee (Malagasy is a French-derived word meaning 'from Madagascar'). It is endemic to the island of Madagascar.

In 2015 DNA analysis was conducted on Madagascar finding that the A. m. unicolor accounted for 99.6% of the DNA sampled. Two ecotypes were identified, one from the highlands of the Hauts Plateaux, and the second from the coastal areas. In 2010 the Varroa destructor mite arrived in Madagascar and concerns had been raised as to the affect the mite may have had on the genetic diversity of the A. m. unicolor on the island.

The A. m. unicolor was identified as belonging to the A Lineage of honey bees, suggesting that the subspecies "might probably result from ancestral introductions to the island", analysis of the mitochondrial and nuclear genetic diversity indicated a recent divergence of possibly 1 million years ago, from other African honey bees as opposed to 6 million years ago, as Madagascar split from the African continent 135 million years ago this suggests a human introduction.

Overall when compared to other Apis mellifera their genetic diversity was very low, but the authors attributed this more likely to be a combination of island isolation preventing introgression with other subspecies, the geography of the island limiting the movement of bees around the island and the high deforestation occurring over the past 1400 years, which has accelerated in the past 50 years.

The A. m. unicolor has been reported to be very docile, Friedrich Ruttner in 1988 commenting that it was "one of the most gentle honeybees in the world".
