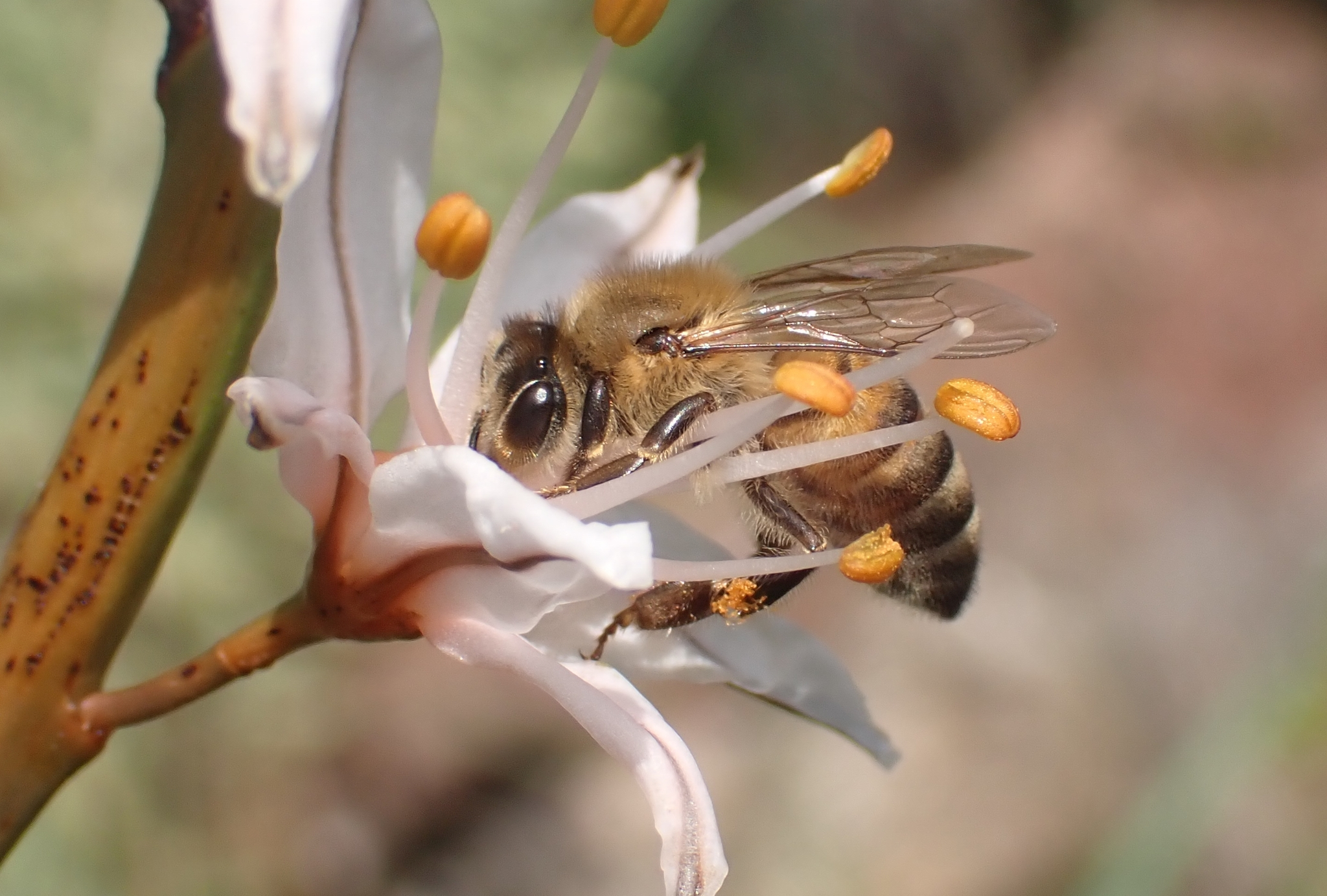

Scientific classification
- Kingdom: Animalia
- Phylum: Arthropoda
- Clade: Pancrustacea
- Class: Insecta
- Order: Hymenoptera
- Family: Apidae
- Genus: Apis
- Species: A. mellifera
- Subspecies: A. m. anatoliaca

Trinomial name
- Apis mellifera anatoliaca Maa, 1953

= Apis mellifera anatoliaca =

Subspecies of honey bee

Apis mellifera anatoliaca (known commonly as the Anatolian honey bee) is a subspecies of Apis mellifera (honey bees).

== Habitat ==
This bee is endemic to the Anatolian region of Turkey, populating the central and western parts of the country, but not European Turkey, as later research identified the honey bees of the Thrace region as primarily A. m. carnica.

== Taxonomy ==
This bee type belongs to the branch of bee classified by Ruttner (1988) as "Oriental". A recent genetic study confirmed that the sub-species belongs to an Eastern Europe branch of the genotype of the honey bee. Mitochondrial Deoxyribonucleaic acid (mtDNA) analysis of Thracian bees showed some similarities to the Apis mellifera carnica, although this same similarity was absent from Anatolian bee samples (Smith and Brown (1990) & Meixner et al. (1993). The cause of this is given as inter-breeding of native populations with nearby Austrian, Slovakian and Croatian bees.
