= Apis mellifera sinisxinyuan =

Scientific classification
- Kingdom: Animalia
- Phylum: Arthropoda
- Class: Insecta
- Order: Hymenoptera
- Family: Apidae
- Genus: Apis
- Species: A. mellifera
- Subspecies: A. m. sinisxinyuan

Trinomial name
- Apis mellifera sinisxinyuan Chen, Liu, Pan, Chen, Wang, Guo, Liu, Lu, Tian, Li & Shi, 2016

Subspecies of honey bee

Apis mellifera sinisxinyuan (the Xinyuan honey bee) was first discovered in 2016 in Xinjiang Uygur Autonomous Region, Urumqi, Xinjiang, China, this subspecies has a range that is the farthest east known for the species of Apis mellifera (honey bees).
