= Apis mellifera meda =

Scientific classification
- Kingdom: Animalia
- Phylum: Arthropoda
- Clade: Pancrustacea
- Class: Insecta
- Order: Hymenoptera
- Family: Apidae
- Genus: Apis
- Species: A. mellifera
- Subspecies: A. m. meda

Trinomial name
- Apis mellifera meda Skorikov 1929

Synonyms
- Apis mellifera remipes Bodenheimer 1941 via. Gerstácker

Subspecies of honey bee

Apis mellifera meda is known by the common names of the Median honey bee or the Iranian honey bee. Its range covers the non desert areas of most of Iran and Iraq, but also into southeastern Turkey, across northern Syria as far as the coast of the Mediterranean. Colonies have been observed in the Azarbaijan Iranian highlands at elevations up to 3,000 m (9,800 ft). Initially based on morphometric evaluation, but then later confirmed with DNA analysis, they belong to the O Lineage (meaning Oriental, from the Near East region) of Apis mellifera.

The appearance of the A. m. meda greatly resembles the Apis mellifera ligustica, to such an extent that identification using standard morphometric analysis requires additional measurements to be taken; however, its scutellum (an area of the upper rear thorax) is bright yellow, unlike the A. m. ligustica in which it is predominantly dark.

The A. m. meda has a reputation for a strong swarming tendency, but only with a moderate swarm cell production of 10 to 20 cells. Its adaptation to long winters is presumed due to the fact that, for example, the Zagros Mountains (covering much of its range) can have days with frost for six months of the year. They appear to be heavy users of propolis, and are quick to be alarmed and show aggression towards intruders near the hive, but with a greater tendency to pursue (up to 200m) in the south Iraq region, than the north Azerbaijan Iran region.
