= Apis mellifera cypria =

Scientific classification
- Kingdom: Animalia
- Phylum: Arthropoda
- Clade: Pancrustacea
- Class: Insecta
- Order: Hymenoptera
- Family: Apidae
- Genus: Apis
- Species: A. mellifera
- Subspecies: A. m. cypria

Trinomial name
- Apis mellifera cypria Pollmann, 1879

Subspecies of honey bee

Apis mellifera cypria (Cyprus honey bee) is a subspecies of the Western honey bee. Its habitat is the Mediterranean island of Cyprus.

== Behaviour ==
A. m. cypria has been reported to be a less swarmy bee when compared to other European honey bees.

In a 2008 study, the growth rate of colonies was observed to be lowest during the hottest month, while the most growth occurred during a month with temperature closer to the yearly average (or slightly above).

== Defense ==
Papachristoforou et al found that in the presence of the predatory oriental hornet (Vespa orientalis) the bees initially generate an acoustic response, and if the encounter escalates, they kill the invader by asphyxiation.

== Taxonomy ==
A separate subspecies from the other two Greek bee subspecies, A. m. macedonica and A. m. cecropia. DNA analysis found its mtDNA is more closely related to A.m. anatoliaca and A. m. meda and belongs to the O Lineage (Oriental branch) of Apis mellifera.
