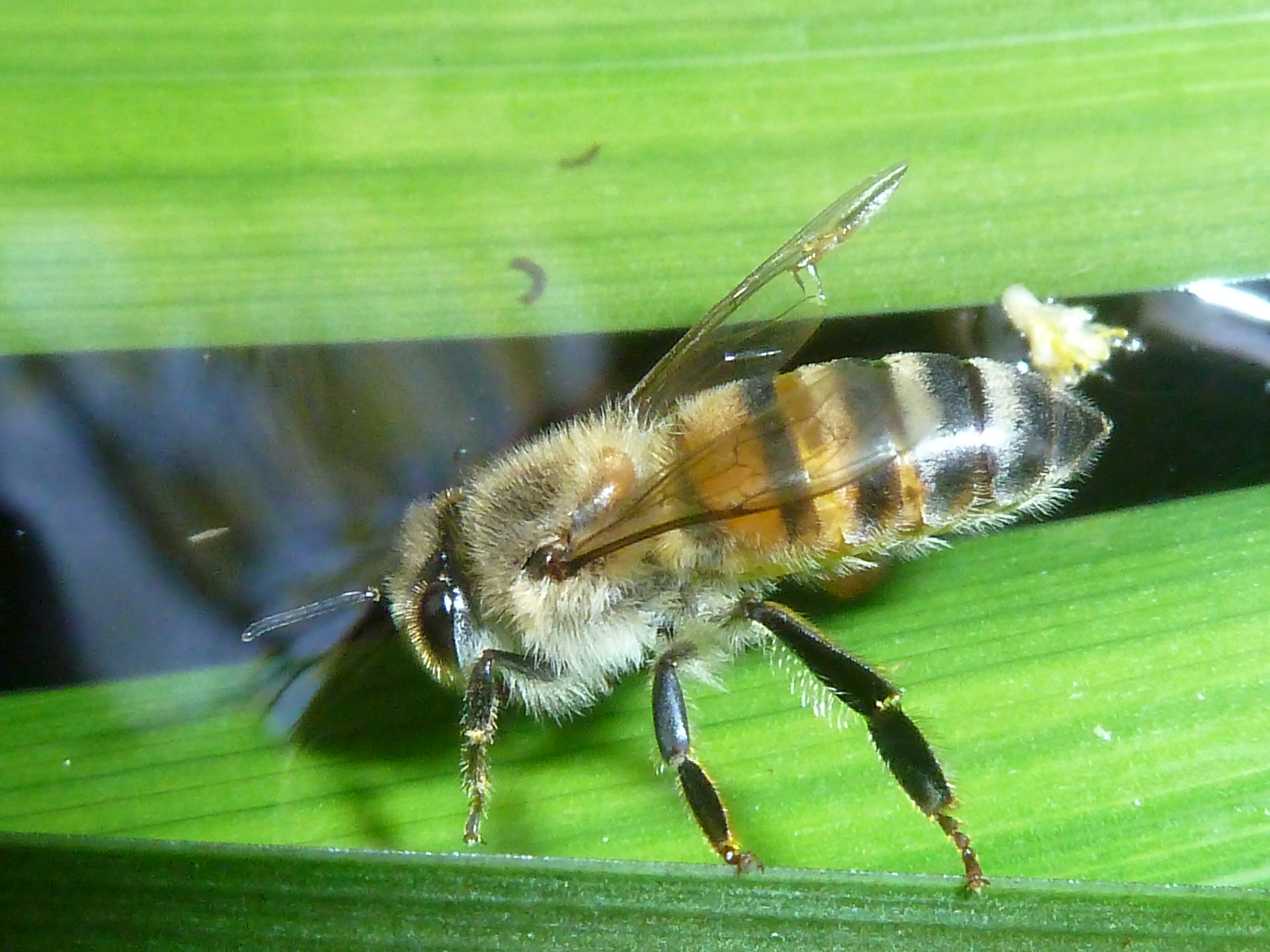
- Worker bee (female) drinking water

Scientific classification
- Kingdom: Animalia
- Phylum: Arthropoda
- Clade: Pancrustacea
- Class: Insecta
- Order: Hymenoptera
- Family: Apidae
- Genus: Apis
- Species: A. mellifera
- Subspecies: A. m. scutellata

Trinomial name
- Apis mellifera scutellata Lepeletier, 1836
- The natural ranges of the East African lowland honey bee, the Cape honey bee, and the contact zone where the two subspecies overlap and hybridize

= Apis mellifera scutellata =

East African lowland honey bee

Subspecies of honey bee native to Africa

The East African lowland honey bee (Apis mellifera scutellata) is a subspecies of the western honey bee. It is native to central, southern and eastern Africa, though at the southern extreme it is replaced by the Cape honey bee (Apis mellifera capensis). This subspecies has been determined to constitute one part of the ancestry of the Africanized bees (also known as "killer bees") spreading through North and South America.

The introduction of the Cape honey bee into northern South Africa poses a threat to East African lowland honey bees. If a female worker from a Cape honey bee colony enters an East African lowland honey bee nest, she is not attacked, partly due to her resemblance to the East African lowland honey bee queen. As she is capable of parthenogenetic reproduction, she may begin laying eggs which hatch as "clones" of herself, which will also lay eggs, causing the parasitic A. m. capensis workers to increase in number. The death of the host colony results from the dwindling numbers of A. m. scutellata workers that perform foraging duties (A. m. capensis workers are greatly under-represented in the foraging force), the death of the queen, and, before queen death, competition for egg laying between A. m. capensis workers and the queen. When the colony dies, the capensis females will seek out a new host colony.

== Character ==
A single East African lowland bee sting is no more venomous than a single European bee sting, though East African lowland honey bees respond more quickly when disturbed than do European honey bees. They send out three to four times as many workers in response to a threat. They will also pursue an intruder for a greater distance from the hive. Although people have died as a result of 100–300 stings, it has been estimated that the average lethal dose for an adult is 500–1,100 bee stings. In terms of industrial honey production, in its natural habitat and the neo-tropics, the African bee produces far more honey than its European counterparts. It is unclear if this is due to a superior nectar gathering ability, lack of adaptability in the European honey bees for tropical environment, or both. Producing more swarms and absconding (abandoning its nest) are also examples of adaptive traits for tropical environment. In times of prolonged dearth they would migrate to a better food source area, a strategy applied also by Apis dorsata, rather than waiting for a better season (European and Oriental bees). The lack of significant energy needs for thermoregulation of the brood nest in the tropics corresponds to a very rapid build-up of even the smallest african colonies, the higher in numbers and smaller in size swarming strategy makes perfect sense.

== Appearance ==
The appearance of the East African lowland honey bee is very similar to the European bee. However, the East African lowland honey bee is slightly smaller. Its upper body is covered in fuzz, and its abdomen is striped with black.

== Habitat ==
The native habitat of Apis mellifera scutellata includes the southern and eastern regions of Africa. The species was first imported across the Atlantic Ocean to Brazil before it spread to Central America, South America, and southern areas of the United States. The Africanized honey bee thrives in tropical areas and is not well adapted for cold areas that receive heavy rainfall.

== Foraging economics and bee habits ==
=== Nectar content and harvesting ===
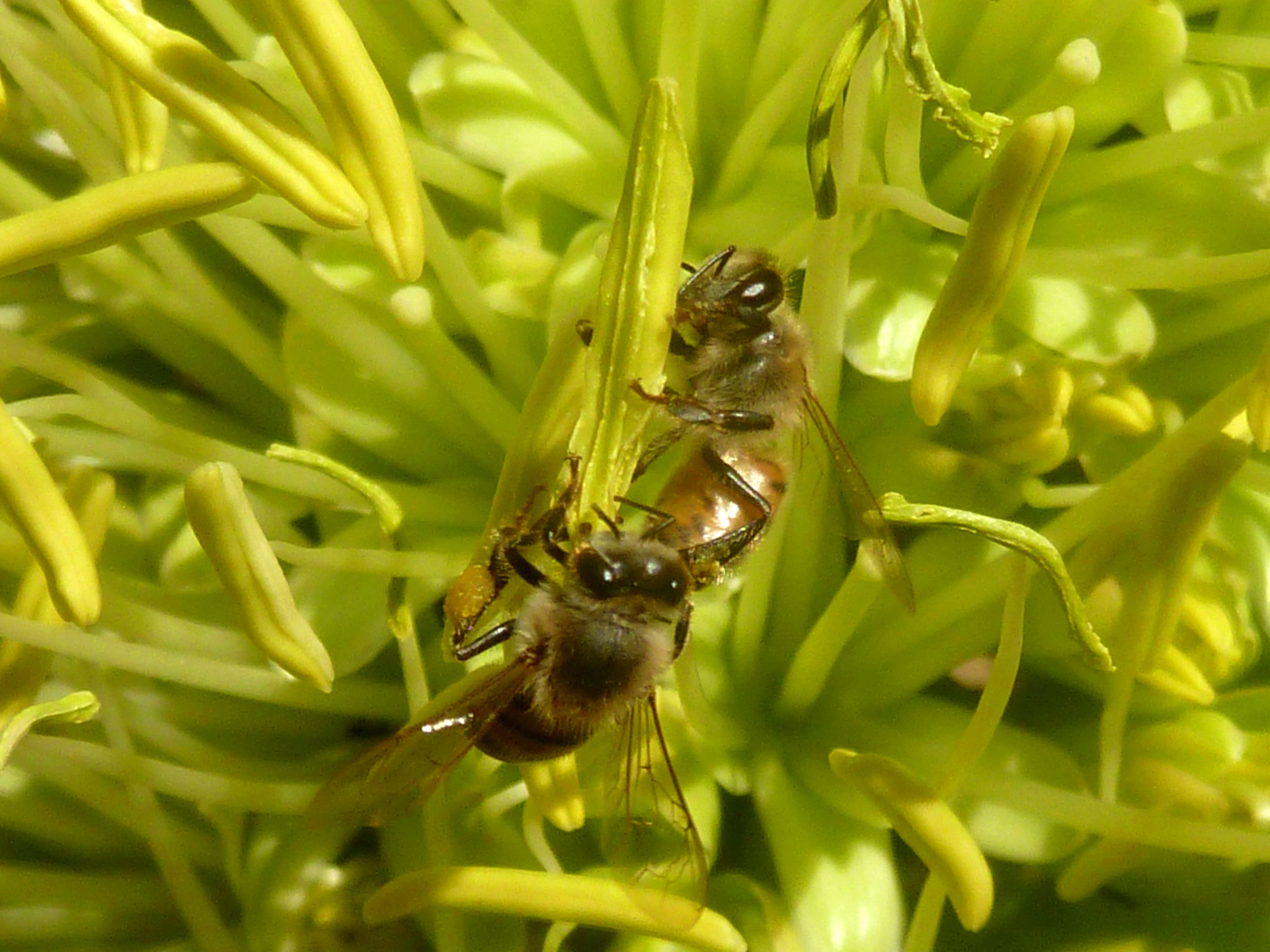
East African lowland worker bees foraging on pollen of an introduced foxtail agave

Honey bees are challenged to balance energy consumption and replenishment in their pursuit of nectar. High thoracic temperatures required for foraging flight pose a thermoregulatory imbalance that honey bees attempt to alleviate by targeting particular viscosities and temperatures of nectar resources. In lower environmental temperatures where energy loss is more pronounced, it has been shown through Apis mellifera scutellata that honey bees seek warmer, less-concentrated and less-viscous nectar, an energetically favorable behavior.

Nectar that is highly concentrated in sugar is more viscous and therefore reduces the speed of consumption and the size of honey bee crop loads. In cooler ambient temperatures, harvesting small, concentrated quantities of nectar does not allow honey bees to maintain the metabolism necessary for foraging flight. Harvesting warmer, less-viscous nectar is advantageous because of the energy gained by heat. Honey bees are able to stabilize their body temperature and make up for the energy lost by flying. In A. m. scutellata, it was found that crop loads were largely contained in the abdomen, though it remains unclear whether this balances out the aforementioned energy loss from the thorax during flight.

It appears that the cost of harvesting less-viscous nectar is that it is also less concentrated in sugar and would be an energetic loss for the honey bees. However, this is not the case; the speed of harvesting nectar with less viscosity increases the quantity harvested at a given time. The relative advantage is so great that it is still more energetically favorable for a honey bee to collect warm nectar, even at low sugar concentrations (10%). Honey bees are energetically rewarded by harvesting nectar that is warmer than ambient temperatures because they make up for energy loss during foraging and obtain more nectar more easily.

The bumblebee’s ability to differentiate flower warmth by color and target warmer flowers is one noted precedent for nectar temperature selection in honey bees.

=== Significance of foraging ===
It has been noted that A. mellifera scutellata have higher rates of colony growth, reproduction, and swarming than European honey bees (A. mellifera ligustica and A. mellifera mellifera), a fitness advantage that allowed them to become an invasive species. A study by Fewell and Bertram was conducted to understand the source of these differences. The differences in fitness strategy were thought to be accounted for by the fact that African worker bees have a greater preference for pollen over nectar, which is a direct food resource for the emerging brood. Another important factor was thought to be differences between the species in age polyethism, or the allotment of different tasks as a honey bee ages. Young worker bees focus on in-hive assistance such as brood care, and the relatively younger African bee populations were thought to be one explanation for the emphasis on reproduction and colony expansion in the species. The study was also interested in the role different colony social environments and different genetic variation might play in the fitness discrepancies between the two subspecies.

==== Behavioral differences ====
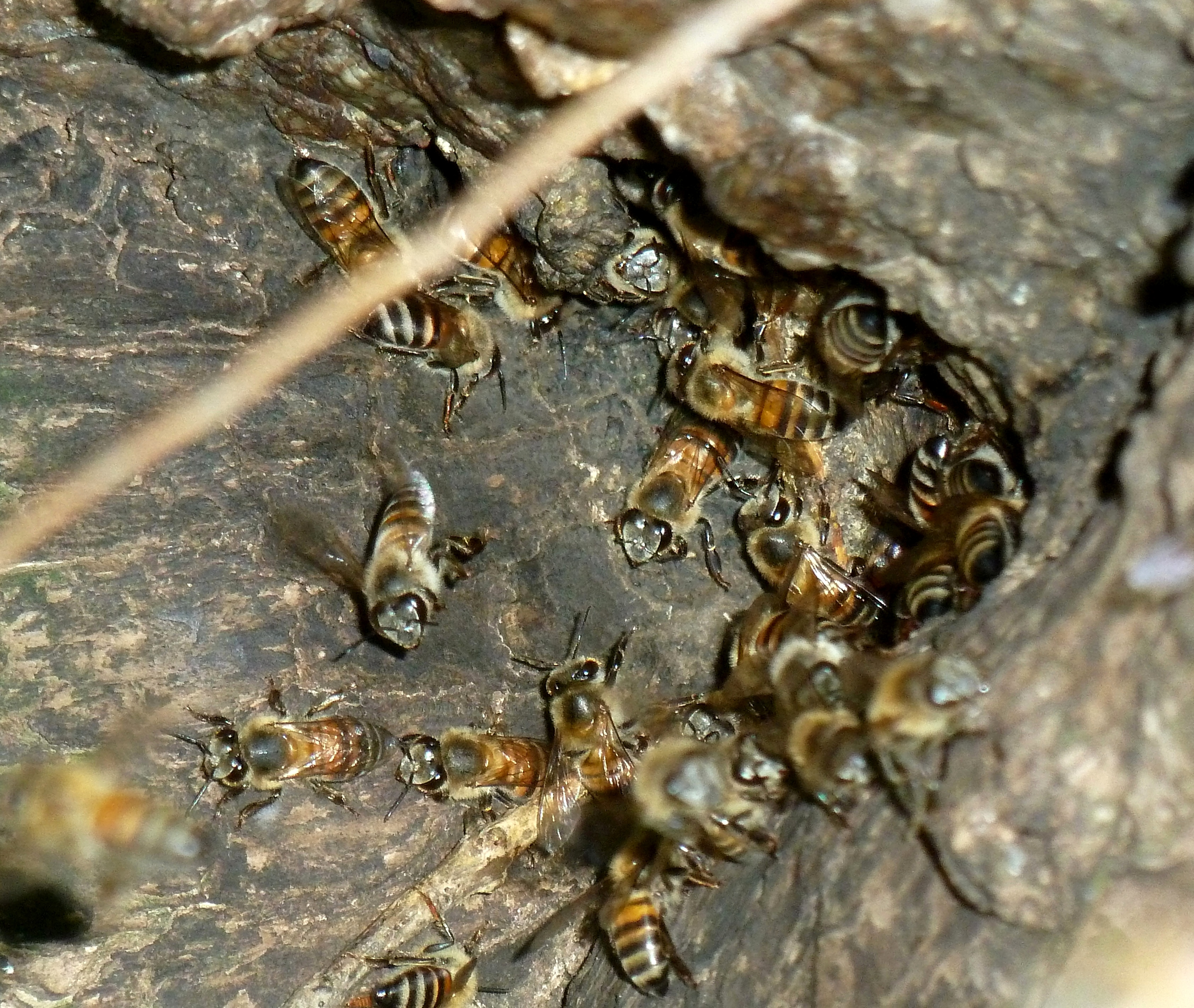
East African lowland worker bees entering and exiting a nest in a rock crevice

The main difference found between African and European honey bees were a few behavioral traits in the worker bees that were all related to the workers’ food preference. It was found that Apis mellifera scutellata workers focused on pollen processing behaviors while European workers focused on nectar processing behaviors. African bees were also more likely to store pollen while European bees stored honey. The study found that worker food preferences determined whether the colony maintained a certain reproductive rate. For example, having fewer or relatively older workers who prefer nectar means that the colony will not have the resources available to rapidly or efficiently feed new broods. Worker food preferences have been connected to genotypic variation at specific quantitative trait loci.

African bees are "precocious foragers"; A. m. scutellata bees begin foraging for pollen significantly earlier than their European counterparts A. m. ligustica, and this is thought to be related to the fact that African colonies have a younger, skewed age distribution by comparison. However, this is not a direct cause for the different subsistence strategies between the two subspecies.

==== Trade-offs of two different strategies ====
Over time, distributions of the genotypic traits for worker food preference must have clustered around those conferring a proclivity towards resources that improved the fitness of the subspecies. The balancing of evolutionary costs and benefits have shaped the distribution of these genotypic traits. A bee population must strike a balance in the distribution of resources towards the growth of the current colony members versus reproduction. If too much energy is expended on the maintenance of an adult colony, the bees will lose the chance to expand through reproduction but they will have older workers who specialize in nectar resources for energy (honey.) If too much energy is spent on reproduction, such a colony will be less equipped to survive drastic seasonal changes because they have younger workers who specialize in pollen for feeding the brood, not energy storage.

==== Evolution of life history strategies ====
These two strategies have been adopted by the European and African bees, respectively. European bees must survive the winter, an annual event with predictable mortality outcomes. Trying to meet the energetic needs of the colony and reproduction might decrease their overall survival during the winter and it is more evolutionarily favorable for them to store nectar and honey. African bees are more vulnerable to less predictable times of scarcity or attack and it is therefore to their advantage to produce as many young as possible, increasing the likelihood that some or even many will survive. Such circumstances would have favored the worker bees who preferred harvesting nectar in European colonies and pollen in African colonies, providing an explanation for how a divergence in worker behavior and age distribution evolved in A. m. scutellata and A. m. ligustica. Fewell and Bertram’s study is significant in that it provides a plausible method through which the fitness characteristics of the subspecies could have evolved from a small number of behavioral differences in worker bees.

== Parasitization ==
The Apis mellifera capensis (the Cape honey bee) has monopolized social parasitism of Apis mellifera scutellata hosts in the southern region of South Africa. Specifically, A. mellifera capensis workers produce crucial pheromones, achieve reproductive status, and overthrow an A. m. scutellata queen. Social parasitism in the social insects can involve various forms of exploitation that disrupt the normal division of labor in the colony. The recent development of technology to study the genetic makeup of colonies has revealed that the offspring contribution of reproducing worker parasites merits closer attention.

In 1990, 400 A. m. capensis colonies were moved into the vicinity of the A. m. scutellata subspecies. Ten years later, a single clonal…worker lineage was found to be devastating A. m. scutellata colonies in northern South Africa. The monopoly of this single lineage shows that they were able to subvert queen regulation of reproduction and worker recognition mechanisms. Dietemann et al. was able to prove that A. m. capensis worker parasites were able to produce mandibular pheromones that mimic that of A. m. scutellata queens while in their presence. The resulting breakdown of the division of labor leads to desertion or death of the parasitized colony.

=== Method and results ===
Although many pheromones contribute to reproduction, pheromones made in the mandibular gland of queens have been closely linked to reproduction, and they are produced by workers that reproduce. The pheromones prevent others from attacking them, induce workers to recognize them as queen, and give them access to higher quality foods. They also stop other workers from turning reproductive. A. m. capensis worker parasites create female clones and usurp the A. m. scutellata queen. The worker parasites and their increasing number of clones become the sole reproductive individuals in the colony. The destruction of the division of labor leads to reduced resources that eventually force the colony to leave or perish.

=== Evolution of pheromone production ===
The single lineage of parasitizing A. m. capensis may have gained evolutionary advantage because, compared to other related species, it is not susceptible to the host queen’s pheromonal reproductive suppression of workers. The non-invasive varieties of A. m. capensis produce less mandibular secretions than the invasive strain. In addition, they produce secretions that are not as similar to that of A. m. scutellata queens as that of the invasive strain. The single lineage was selected for its greater resistance to and greater ability to mimic and overwhelm the pheromonal regulation by host queens.

==== Pheromonal differences ====
It was discovered that A. m. scutellata queens produce more pheromones than A. m. capensis queens, suggesting that quality or content of pheromones rather than quantity may explain how A. m. capensis workers are able to disregard host queen signals. Pheromonal differences between the subspecies is a subject that requires more in-depth investigation to understand how such parasitization is made possible. As mandibular pheromones were a focus of the Dietemann et al. study it is probable that different glands contribute to the pheromones related to reproductive status.

=== Evolutionary advantages and disadvantages ===
The multifaceted aspect of communication in social insects makes social insect colonies easy to hijack. Especially in the case of closely related species and subspecies, the biology and organization of potential host species are similar to that of potential parasitizing species, making them easier to infiltrate. On the other hand, potential parasites face the challenge of being discovered by the host queen, usually the sole reproductive individual in the colony. The existence of A. m. capensis worker parasites is an example of an alternative evolutionary strategy that allows them to increase their "direct fitness in foreign colonies rather than inclusive fitness in their natal nests." Workers usually focus their efforts on raising and caring for larvae that are related to them, thus preserving the propagation of their genes and contributing to their inclusive fitness. The parasitic model is more advantageous by comparison because it allows workers to directly reproduce offspring that are more closely related to them and greater in number, so they are a component of direct fitness.

The invasive lineage of A. m. capensis succeeded either because of an inability to recognize the host A. m. scutellata queen signal correctly or a resistance to the signal. Ultimately this is an interesting example of a preexisting weakness towards social parasitism by A. m. capensis in A. m. scutellata. Organisms evolve reproductive strategies that ensure the survival and propagation of the organisms’ genes. Successful reproductive strategies cope with particular economic constraints experienced by the organism. The parasitic relationship between A. m. scutellata and A. m. capensis is an example of how a normally successful strategy of chemical recognition and maintenance of a reproductive division of labor can be undermined by competing, exploitative strategies.

== Evolution ==
The underlying hypothesis for the aggressive behavior of East African lowland honey bees is based on the idea that this race of bees evolved in an arid environment, where the bees' food was scarce. Under this situation, selection favored more aggressive colonies, which protected their food source and hive from predators and robbed bees from other colonies. This behavior allowed more aggressive colonies to survive where the less aggressive colonies eventually were selected against by natural selection.

== See also ==
- Subspecies of Apis mellifera
- Western honey bee
