= Apis mellifera monticola =

Scientific classification
- Kingdom: Animalia
- Phylum: Arthropoda
- Class: Insecta
- Order: Hymenoptera
- Family: Apidae
- Genus: Apis
- Species: A. mellifera
- Subspecies: A. m. monticola

Trinomial name
- Apis mellifera monticola F.G. Smith 1961

Subspecies of honey bee

Apis mellifera monticola is known by the common name of the East African mountain honey bee. In 2017 its complete mitochondrial genome was sequenced, confirming that it belonged to the A Lineage of honey bees and concluding that "A phylogenetic tree showed that A. m. monticola clusters with other African subspecies".

In 2017 DNA analysis identified differentiation between lowland (A. m. scutellata) and highland (A. m. monticola) honey bees, that is believed to give the A. m. monticola an advantage in the cooler and wetter environment of the highlands; some hybridization was observed in some hives but this appeared to be low. The research concluded that the DNA suggested that these two subspecies DNA divergence actually predated the divergence between the other Apis mellifera subspecies.

Its range occurs within the mountains of eastern Africa (east of Lake Victoria), in Kenya and Tanzania; the claims that its range could extend towards the mountains of Cameroon have been questioned.

In 1987 Brother Adam, the breeder of the Buckfast bee breed, visited Tanzania to collect A. m. monticola bees and incorporated them into his Buckfast breeding programme, in part due to their reputation of resistance to cooler and wetter weather, along with a docile temperament, it was believed they would complement the Buckfast bees characteristics. Later in 1989 a Swedish expedition visited the Mount Elgon region of Kenya, collecting A. m. monticola bees with the aim of determining their Varroa mite resistance, and to see if this could be incorporated into A. m. ligusta and Buckfast bees.

Their appearance is uniformly black in colour, with their wings having a darker tinge than other honey bees, with the Queens having somewhat longer legs.
