= Apis mellifera adami =

Cretan honey bee

Scientific classification
- Kingdom: Animalia
- Phylum: Arthropoda
- Class: Insecta
- Order: Hymenoptera
- Family: Apidae
- Genus: Apis
- Species: A. mellifera
- Subspecies: A. m. adami

Trinomial name
- Apis mellifera adami Ruttner, 1975

Synonyms
- Apis mellifera adamii (mis-spelling)

Subspecies of honey bee

Apis mellifera adami is a western honey bee subspecies, endemic to the island of Crete in the eastern Mediterranean.

== Taxonomy ==
The Apis mellifera adami was classified by Ruttner 1975 and named by him after Brother Adam.

Research in 2003 concluded that "the honey bee from Crete seems to be similar to the honey bee populations from other areas of Greece" while yet acknowledging that their genetic structures had most likely been changed over the past two decades due to migratory beekeeping and commercial breeding, concluding that there seemed to be no pure populations of A. m. adami left on the island.

== Beekeeping ==
Western Cretan beehives are constructed of terracotta, wood and wicker. On the east of the island the hives are always ceramic.

== See also ==
- Bee domestication and Beekeeping
