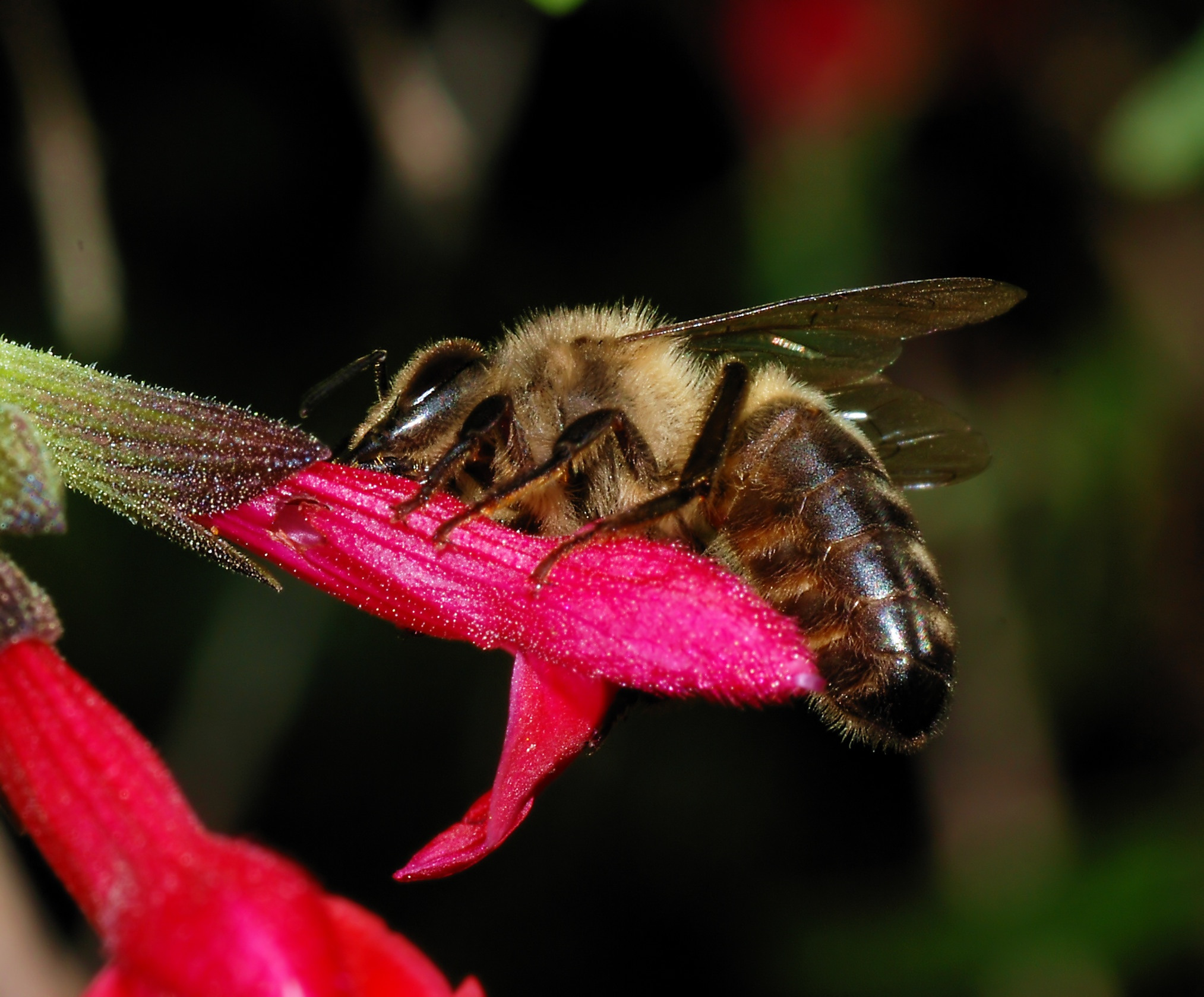

Scientific classification
- Kingdom: Animalia
- Phylum: Arthropoda
- Clade: Pancrustacea
- Class: Insecta
- Order: Hymenoptera
- Family: Apidae
- Genus: Apis
- Species: A. mellifera
- Subspecies: A. m. mellifera

Trinomial name
- Apis mellifera mellifera Linnaeus, 1758

Synonyms
- Apis mellifica germanica (Pollmann 1879); Apis mellifica nigrita (Lucas 1882); Apis mellifica mellifica variety lehzeni (Buttel-Reepen 1906); Apis mellifica mellifica variety siziliana (Buttel-Reepen 1906); Apis mellifera mellifera variety tesquorum (Skorikov 1929); Apis niger (Baldensperger 1932); Apis mellifica mellifica siloarum (Goetze 1964)

= European dark bee =

Apis mellifera mellifera

Subspecies of honey bee

The Apis mellifera mellifera (commonly known as the European dark bee) is a subspecies of the western honey bee, evolving in central Asia, with a proposed origin of the Tien Shan Mountains and later migrating into eastern and then northern Europe after the last ice age from 9,000BC onwards. Its original range included the southern Urals in Russia and stretched through northern Europe and down to the Pyrenees. They are one of the two members of the 'M' lineage of Apis mellifera, the other being in western China. Traditionally they were called the Black German Bee, although they are now considered endangered in Germany. However today they are more likely to be named after the region in which they live, such as the British black bee, the Native Irish Honey Bee, the Cornish black bee and the Nordic brown bee, even though they are all the same subspecies, with the word "native" often inserted by local beekeepers, even in places where the bee is an introduced foreign species. It was domesticated in Europe and hives were brought to North America in the colonial era in 1622 where they were referred to as the English Fly by the Native Americans.

== Appearance ==
The A. m. mellifera can be broadly distinguished from other subspecies by their stocky body, abundant thoracal and sparse abdominal hair which is brown, and overall dark coloration. When viewed from a distance, they appear blackish or rich dark brown. They are large for honey bees though they have unusually short tongues (5.7-6.4mm). Their common name (dark or black bee) is derived from their brown-black color, with only a few lighter yellow spots on the abdomen. On a pigmentation rating from 0 (completely dark) to 9 (completely bright yellow) the A. m. mellifera scores 2.1, for comparison a A. m. carnica scores a 1.3 and a A. m. ligustica scores a 7.8. In 2019 research concluded that honey bees in Ireland that were completely dark contained less A. m. mellifera DNA than bees with yellow to orange spots on their abdomens, and bees with pigmentation on their first and second tergites (segments of their abdomens) contained a comparable amount of A. m. mellifera DNA than the completely dark bees, the authors speculated that the completely dark bees had obtained their darker pigmentation from A. m. carnica DNA.

Friedrich Ruttner worked closely with senior members of the BIBBA (Bee Improvement & Bee Breeders Association) in Britain to identify wing veins (wing morphometry) to achieve "racial purity" in the breeding of their bees, culminating in the publication of their book The Dark European Honeybee. However the process depends on the exact measuring methods employed.

== Character ==
A. m. mellifera is descended from the 'M' lineage of Apis mellifera, of which all bees to a greater or lesser degree have aggression when compared to the 'C' lineage. Honey bees containing A. m. mellifera DNA have an even greater reputation of aggression amongst beekeepers, which can increase in subsequent generations if left unchecked, although this characteristic can be overcome with continual selective breeding over some generations. They are nervous and aggressive to the extent that routine inspections will take longer, decreasing the enjoyment of managing their colonies. This characteristic is one that has been traditionally associated with A. m. mellifera going back to the now extinct Old British Black bee before the early 1900s: To quote Brother Adam who was the only beekeeper with first hand experience that committed his findings to paper:

"The native (Old British Black) bee had undoubtedly many extremely valuable characteristics, but equally so a great many serious defects and drawbacks. She was very bad tempered and very susceptible to brood diseases and would in any case not have been able to produce the crops (of honey) we have secured since her demise".

In 2014-2017 a European wide survey was conducted with 621 colonies, which included the various subspecies kept by beekeepers, it found that the A. m. mellifera was the most aggressive, had the highest swarming tendency and the lowest hygienic behaviour - a trait closely linked with Varroa sensitive hygiene.

== Characteristics ==
Negatives:

- higher levels of aggression
- increased tendency to swarm
- lower resistance to varroa mites due to poorer hygienic behaviour
- prone to inbreeding due to habit of Apiary Vicinity Mating, resulting in increased aggression
- difficulty entering smaller flowers due to their larger size
- difficulty collecting nectar from longer flowers due to their shorter tongues
- slightly poorer pollinators of fruit trees and bushes in summer
- more prone to Balling the Queen, resulting in her death
- susceptible to brood diseases
- susceptible to a greater likelihood of Supersedure than other bees
- less prolific, population building up later in year, unable to take full advantage of a very early spring nectar flow

Benefits:

- A. m. mellifera Queens do not readily hybridize with non-A. m. mellifera Drones

== Non-hybridization ==
In 2013 research was carried out in Poland which confirmed anecdotal evidence that A. m. mellifera virgin Queens do not readily mate with non-A. m. mellifera drones, "The progeny of AMM queens was fathered almost exclusively by AMM drones. On the other hand, progeny of AMC queens was fathered by drones of both subspecies". Further research was conducted in western Ireland on Beara peninsula (as part of genetic research carried out throughout the island in 2017), which confirmed the 2013 Polish research in that the A. m. mellifera virgin Queens were not mating with either A. m. carnica or Buckfast drones, nor their hybrids. Several conjectures were presented as an explanation to this characteristic of A. m. mellifera, but no conclusion was reached.

== Significance ==
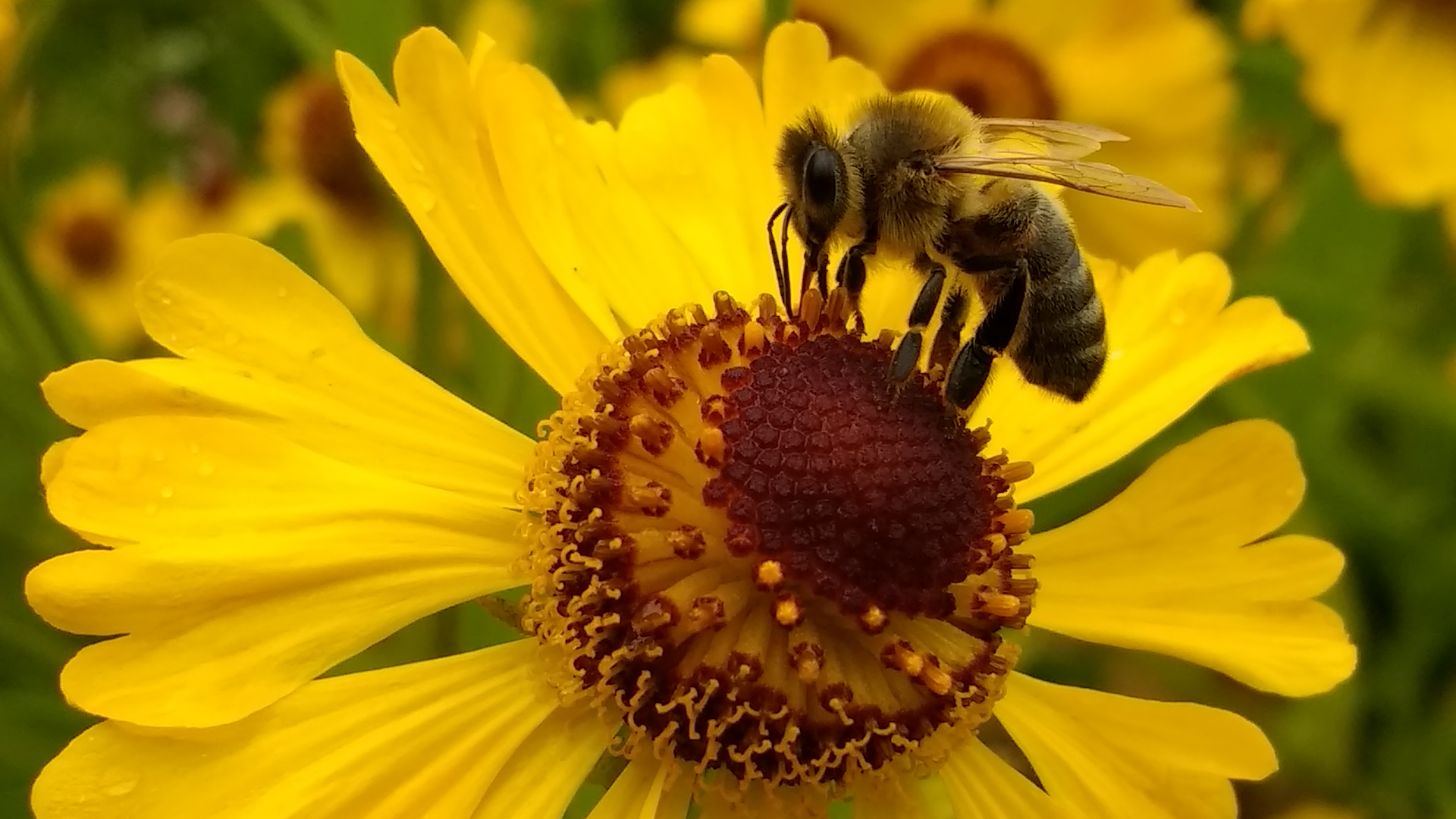
Apis mellifera mellifera

The A. m. mellifera had become established from the Urals to northwestern Europe by the 1800s until the introduction of other bee subspecies, considered more suited to modern beekeeping, such as the A. m. carnica or the Buckfast bee, a breed of bee whose ancestry originally included the remnants of the old British black bee (a strain or phenotype of A. m. mellifera), which became extinct due to the Isle of Wight Disease.

In the United States, research based on DNA sequencing analysis found DNA from the 'M' lineage of honey bees in the feral population of Arkansas, Louisiana, Mississippi, Oklahoma, and Missouri, believed in part to be the DNA from imported bees of over 100 years ago (DNA from the other bee lineages was also found in these feral populations, suggesting that they likely came from escaped swarms from apiaries at multiple unknown times in the past).

== Promotion and conservation areas ==
Dedicated organizations have been attempting to establish exclusive conservation areas for A. m. mellifera, also breeding groups have been set up to "establish racial purity" of "native strains" and others running courses to train beekeepers in being able to calculate the "racial purity" of their bees through wing morphometry. Other organizations are attempting to establish that the A. m. mellifera in their local geographic region are a distinct "variety", some even claiming it is a separate subspecies, of the A. m. mellifera subspecies, but to date there is no published research to support this, however through morphometry and DNA analysis local geographic strains may be able to be identified, albeit not consistent across the geographic population, in which the strain's characteristics show less morphometric variation and therefore less environmental adaptability. With one group even starting a "project to develop their own native breed of bee". Many promoters of the A. m. mellifera claim that the sub-species is endangered and under threat from imports, even though DNA analysis has been able to show that the amount of non-A. m. mellifera DNA within local populations of A. m. mellifera remains relatively low, with an Irish survey showing that 97.8% of sampled bees were determined to be pure A. m. mellifera, and a further study across eight northwest European countries showing that their A. m. mellifera populations were genetically pure.

=== Nazi Germany ===
Logo of the Reich Ministry of Food and Agriculture, and the Blood and Soil ideology

In 1937 the Third Reich implemented nativist policies to protect and promote the A. m. mellifera, as an extension of their ideology of "Blood and Soil" (Blut und Boden - a Nazi slogan expressing a racially defined group pertaining to a geographic area), by banning imports of Honey Bees (Apis mellifera) and regulating the breeding of bees, in which only registered breeders at designated locations were permitted to rear queens to supply German beekeepers; however a limited dispensation was made for a minority of A. m. carnica beekeepers in southern Germany constituting only 13% overall. But after the annexation of Austria in 1938 the amount of A. m. carnica breeders increased to 31%. In 1939 actions were taken to reduce the numbers (by approximately 95%) of A. m. carnica being bred in Germany, resulting in the Native German Dark bee being promoted fore-mostly. Beekeeping literature at the time used the racial ideological vocabulary of the National Socialists (only in concentrated form), such as: "What is not race is chaff!" "Foreign drones are to be exterminated" and "But what use is it if one day a Jewish bastard (a German with Jewish ancestry) is a genius, but our ethnic purity is destroyed in the process (through inter-marriage). It is no different with beekeeping, what use is the importation of foreign breeds (sub-species)... if our (Native) German bee is lost in the process (through inter-breeding)".

However, starting in the winter of 1940 to 1942, beekeeping was devastated throughout Germany by huge colony deaths, later identified by Karl Von Frisch as a virulent strain of Nosema apis, through his work with the Nosema Council to try and tackle the problem; ironically it was this epidemic that saved Von Frisch from the Nazis' antisemitic policies, as his maternal Grandmother was Jewish, making him "25% Jewish" ("75% German").

As a result restrictions against the breeding of A. m. carnica was lifted and German beekeepers began to re-stock with more disease resistant Austrian A. m. carnica bees: After the war all National Socialism rhetoric was abandoned and breeding of bees was purely focused on performance and character. It was then decided by the German Beekeeping Associations to keep only the A. m. carnica bee due to its superior characteristics; as a result the Old German Dark bee (A. m. mellifera) is now considered an endangered sub-species in Germany.

=== Isle of Man ===
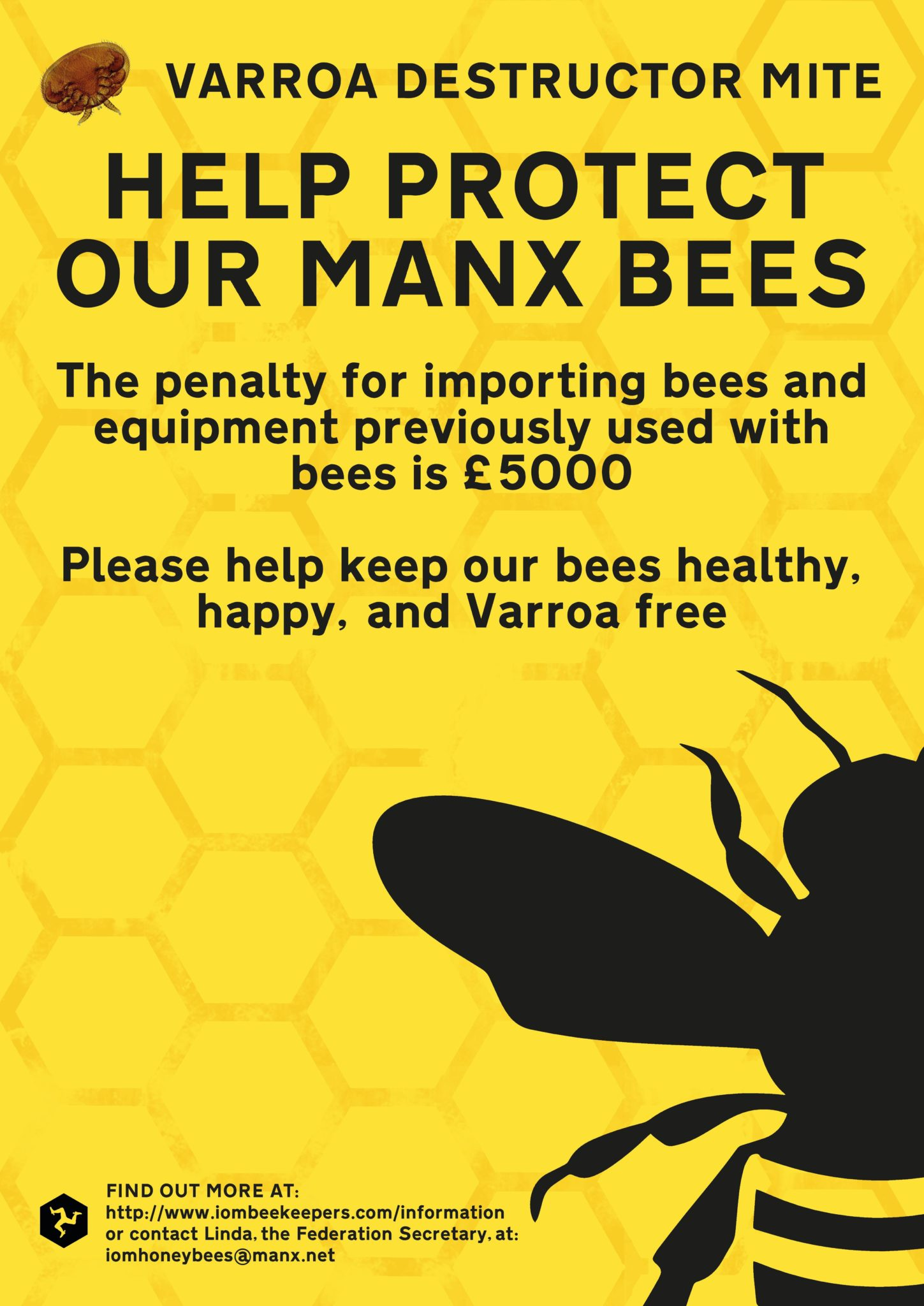
Poster produced by the Isle of Man Beekeepers Federation.

In 1988, the Importation of Bees Order made it illegal to import bees or used bee equipment into the Isle of Man. Originally this was done to prevent the Varroa mite from arriving on the island; in 2015 the EU "declared the Isle of Man officially free of the bee pest Varroa". However, in 2015 the Isle of Man Beekeepers' Federation launched the Manx Bee Improvement Group, to promote what they called the "Manx Dark Honey Bee (Apis mellifera mellifera)". They work closely with the BIBBA with the stated goal of eliminating "foreign strains" from the island through regular inspections of hives. Beekeepers on the Isle of Man are now compelled to register their bees in line with the Bee Diseases and Pest Control (Isle of Man) Order 2008, they must inform the Department of Environment, Food and Agriculture of any movement of bees or bee equipment and the creation of new hives; failure to register or comply, risks prosecution and "a fine not exceeding £5,000".

=== Isle of Læsø ===
In 1993 a conservation area for A. m. mellifera was established on the island of Læsø in Denmark, where it became illegal to keep and import any other type of bee other than Apis mellifera mellifera, this was met with protests and a legal battle lasting eight years from other beekeepers of A. m. ligustica, A. m. carnica and Buckfast bees as they did not "want to become a custodian of poor bees", they also stated that A. m. mellifera was "unproductive" and "not worthy of protection". They lost their case in 2001, and negotiations between A. m. mellifera beekeepers and non-A. m. mellifera beekeepers were concluded in 2004, splitting the island in two between them, ending a "history of sabotage of bees" on the island. The A. m. mellifera supporters claimed that they had "introduced apartheid on Læsø for the bees".

A 2014 European wide survey, which covered 621 colonies, found that the A. m. mellifera from Læsø had the lowest hygienic behaviour of all bees tested, (a trait closely linked with Varroa sensitive hygiene) which would make them more susceptible to varroa mites.

=== Islands of Colonsay and Oronsay ===
In 2013 the Scottish Government introduced the Bee Keeping (Colonsay and Oronsay) Order, making it an offence to keep any other honeybee (Apis mellifera) on either island other than the subspecies Apis mellifera mellifera. The Environment and Climate Change Minister said at the time, "The Bee Keeping Order illustrates how our non-native species legislation can be used to protect our native wildlife. The order is a targeted measure to protect an important population of black bees on Colonsay from hybridisation" (the "non-native species legislation" was used because Apis mellifera are considered to be non-native to Colonsay, but considered native to Scotland as it was the first honey bee to be introduced for use in beekeeping). The islands are home to fifty to sixty beehives (a minimum of fifty colonies of unrelated bees are required to prevent inbreeding) and are referred to now as the "Colonsay Dark Native Bee" even though they were collected from across Scotland in the previous thirty years and genetic analysis has shown introgression from Australian and New Zealand A. m. ligustica. In 2018 it was claimed by the Galtee Bee Breeding Group (GBBG) based in Ireland in County Tipperary that they had "sent bees to Colonsay", earlier DNA evidence had confirmed a genetic link between the two populations.

== In the media ==
- In the documentary More than Honey, the bee kept and bred by Swiss-German beekeeper Fred Jaggi was A. m. mellifera, referred to as the "local black breed", in which he strives to maintain "racially pure" bees, lamenting when he discovers yellow coloration in the colony of one of his queens, meaning that she has bred with a drone from a different sub-species and produced "little half-breeds", she is subsequently killed; we see in the documentary his pure bees succumbing to a brood disease and having to be gassed, then burned: Jaggi abandons the local black bees and the goal of racial purity, choosing A. m. carnica bees instead, with an apiary that includes hybrids to enhance genetic diversity, which are found to be "more disease resistant".
- In 2012 a story began to circulate online and in some British newspapers, in which Dorian Pritchard, the Conservation officer for the BIBBA and President of SICAMM (International Association for the Protection of the European Dark Bee), was interviewed and quoted, saying that the Old British Black Bee (an extinct strain of A. m. mellifera) was not extinct and had been discovered in the rafters of a church in Northumberland. There were numerous inaccuracies in the story, including:

(1) The Old "British Black" bee was "wiped out by a strain of Spanish flu in 1919":
The Spanish flu only affected humans, it was the Isle of Wight Disease between 1904 through to 1945 that was believed to have wiped out the original Old British (and Irish) Black Bees of the British Isles.

(2) "The Spanish flu which wiped out ... every single bee in the UK":
No beekeepers at the time made this claim, what was claimed was that the indigenous Apis mellifera mellifera of the British Isles was wiped out, hybrids with other non-Apis mellifera mellifera bees often survived, notably A. m. ligustica and later the Buckfast bee bred by Brother Adam of Buckfast Abbey, also continental A. m. mellifera, imported in subsequent years to repopulate the country, showed stronger resistance to the Isle of Wight Disease.

(3) "The British Black bee is different from other bees ... ideally suited to the British climate ... more so than the European Black bee":
This suggests that the "British Black Bee" found in the church is a different subspecies than the "European Black Bee" (A. m. mellifera), while in fact they are the same subspecies, as acknowledged by Philip Denwood writing in SICAMM's magazine mellifera.ch in 2014 (as a member of BBKA and the BIBBA) "... in the last decade DNA studies ... have conclusively shown that modern specimens of Dark Bees from the UK and Ireland fit into the genetic specification of Apis mellifera mellifera (the European dark / black bee)".

== Breeding for Varroa resistance ==
=== Varroa sensitive hygiene (VSH) ===
In 2010, it was announced at the VIth COLOSS Conference that a project using the British native honey bee Apis mellifera mellifera was to be set up to breed for Varroa Sensitive Hygiene (VSH). In April 2016, the Laboratory of Apiculture and Social Insects at the University of Sussex (LASI) began blogging about the project. They stated, "we have established LASI Queen Bees to supply our hygienic bees to UK beekeepers", supplying "several hundred queens to British beekeepers". By May 2017 many of the apiaries had a standstill order imposed on them by Bee Inspectors of the National Bee Unit to prevent the spread of EFB (European foulbrood) from infected colonies, a disease associated with a low nurse bee to brood ratio, resulting in lower hygiene levels within the hive. The LASI Queen Bees breeding project "using the British native honey bee" has not been revived.

=== Grooming behavior ===
In 2016 Dorian Pritchard, a prominent member of the BIBBA and SICAMM, published an article in The Journal of Apicultural Research, entitled "Grooming by honey bees as a component of varroa resistant behavior", in which he reviewed much of the existing research into the "assumed links" between the grooming behavior of honey bees and varroa resistance stating "one of the most effective recognized means of defense is body grooming", even though varroa mite resistance had already been achieved in 2008 through the breeding of bees with VSH.

In promoting A. m. mellifera for breeding of the grooming behavior, the paper states that "Anecdotal reports suggest that the high level of resistance of some British near-native A. m. mellifera strains may be due to grooming, but no detailed reports have yet been published". (Note: The phrase "near-native" within black bee beekeeping circles refers to bees which have some non-A. m. mellifera DNA, but otherwise their appearance matches A. m. mellifera.)

Pritchard goes on to promote A. m. mellifera by citing research by Bak & Wilde (2016) into the grooming behavior and Pritchard states "that A. m. mellifera of the Augustowska line were outstandingly the most reactive to the presence of a mite placed on their bodies, 98% of bees reacting to shed the mite"; the Bak and Wilde research paper stated "as many as 98% of worker bees in this group (A. m. mellifera) made an attempt to remove mites", while for "Carniolan (A. m. carnica) bees" it was 89.3% and for "Caucasian (A. m. caucasia) bees" it was 86%. However, only 8.2% of the A. m. mellifera were successful in removing mites, for the A. m. caucasia it was 10.9%, and for the A. m. carnica it was near 3.5%. It was noted that "no mites were actually damaged in the laboratory experiments" and that "about 80% of mites removed remounted their hosts and remarkably, no physical damage was visible on any mites, even after bees had been seen vigorously shaking and even chewing them".

However, research into "hygienic behaviour" (VSH) previously published by Siuda et al. (2007) had concluded that the "Bees of A. m. mellifera (also the Augustowska line) demonstrated the strongest ability for cleaning comb cells from dead capped brood, however many of their behavioural characters did not promote the management of modern apiaries. The better solution would be rather the selection of lines with hygienic behaviour on the basis of Carniolan or Caucasian bees". A subsequent paper published by Kruitwagen et al. (2017) concluded that the grooming behavior itself did not lead to Varroa resistance and on average led to higher mite levels.

Breeding for grooming behavior with the aim of achieving Varroa resistance is still promoted by A. m. mellifera organisations.
