= Apis mellifera lamarckii =

Lamarck's honey bee

Scientific classification
- Kingdom: Animalia
- Phylum: Arthropoda
- Class: Insecta
- Order: Hymenoptera
- Family: Apidae
- Genus: Apis
- Species: A. mellifera
- Subspecies: A. m. lamarckii

Trinomial name
- Apis mellifera lamarckii Cockerell, 1906

Synonyms
- Apis fasciata (Latreille 1804) (outdated)

Subspecies of honey bee

Lamarck's honey bee or the Egyptian honey bee, Apis mellifera lamarckii, is a subspecies of honey bee occurring in a narrow range along the Egyptian Nile Valley of Egypt and Sudan, named after Jean-Baptiste Lamarck and is considered the first honey bee domesticated, before 2600BC.

== Description ==
It is a dark honey bee with yellow abdomen, and is a small subspecies like the subspecies south of the Sahara. The Lamarck's mitotype can also be identified in honey bees from California.

A trait of the A. m. lamarckii is that it does not collect propolis nor does it form winter clusters and therefore may not overwinter well in areas that experience freezing temperatures or prolonged winters.

It is considered aggressive, with a low honey yield.

== See also ==
- Subspecies of Apis mellifera
