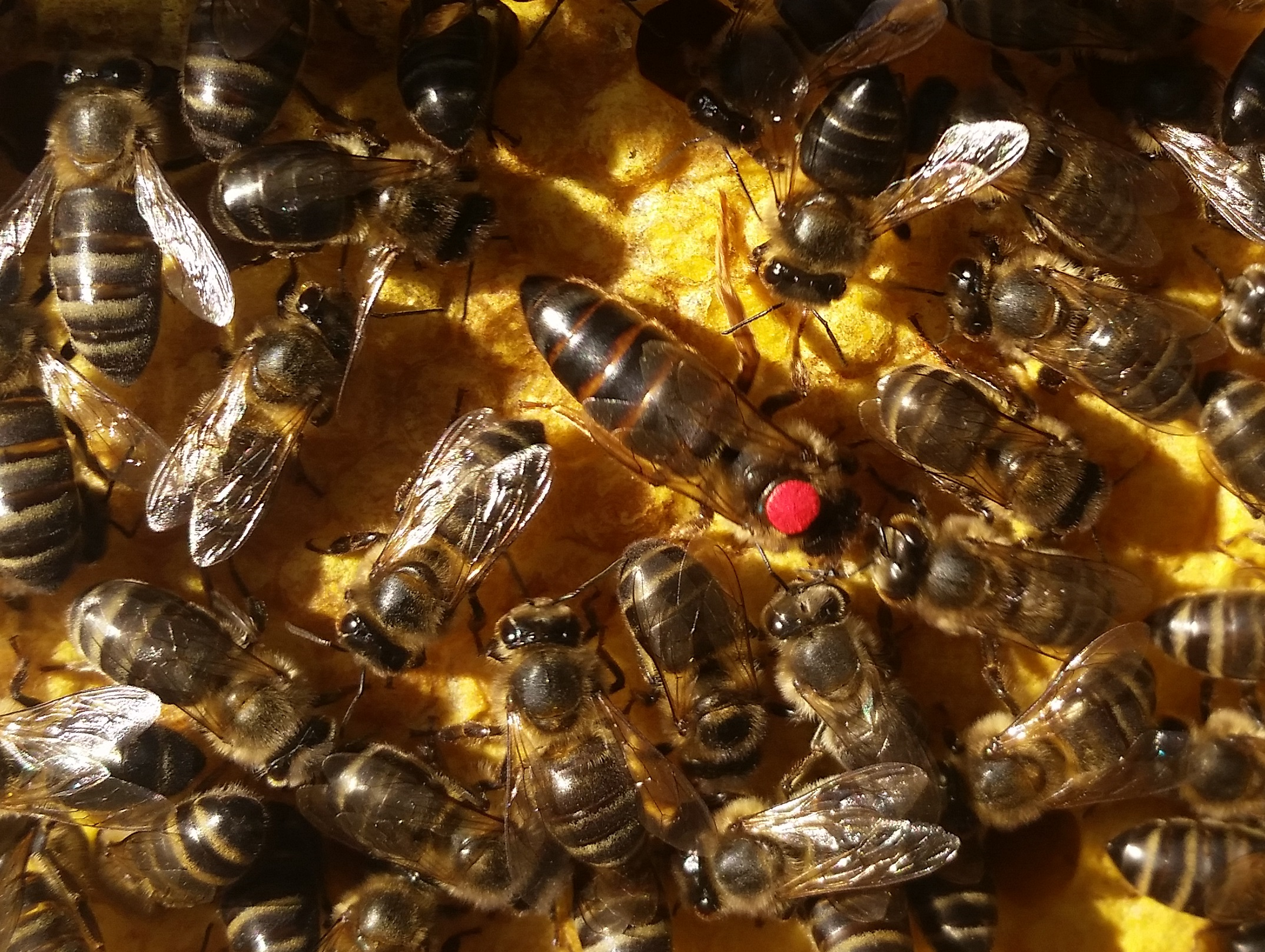

Scientific classification
- Kingdom: Animalia
- Phylum: Arthropoda
- Clade: Pancrustacea
- Class: Insecta
- Order: Hymenoptera
- Family: Apidae
- Genus: Apis
- Species: A. mellifera
- Subspecies: A. m. intermissa

Trinomial name
- Apis mellifera intermissa (Buttel-Reepen, 1906)

Synonyms
- Apis mellifera major

= Apis mellifera intermissa =

Subspecies of honey bee

Apis mellifera intermissa is an African subspecies of the western honey bee.

== Description ==
Previously classified as A. m.intermissa v. Buttel-Reepen a reviewed classification of genus instead states the sub-species as A. m. intermissa v. Maa (M. S. Engel 1999) Found in the south of Spain and the (Maghreb) north of the Sahara desert in Africa, ranging from the east (Libya, Algeria) to the west (Morocco), and is adapted to dry climates. This bee has a black-brown and orange striated abdomen and black-brown thorax with orange fur.

== Taxonomy ==
In a comparative study of five subspecies and A. m. iberica (Smith, Palopoli, Taylor, Garnery, Cornuet, Solignac, Brown 1991) cleavage maps obtained through the use of restriction enzymes showed that the Spanish honey bee contains mtDNA (mitochondrial DNA) similar to intermissa and also mellifera. Additionally, A. m. intermissa belongs to a group shown by experiment to have similar mtDNA, this including monticola, scuttelata, adansonii and capensis

In Spanish honey bee populations, mtDNA haplotypes of African bee strains were found to be frequently present (Smith 1991, Garnery et al 1995) (Cornuet et al 1975, 1978, 1982, 1988; Ruttner 1988; Cornuet and Fresnaye 1989; Orante-Bermejos and Garcia-Fernandez 1995; Hepburn and Radloff 1996). Migrating honey bee populations formed the original colonies of honey bees in western Europe, landing to eventually populate the continent from Africa across the Straits of Gibraltar.

== Genomics ==
In 2015, a draft genome sequence of Apis mellifera intermissa was published by Nizar Haddad and colleagues in Genomics Data. The study provided genomic data for the Algerian honey bee subspecies and contributed to research on the molecular characterization of North African honey bee populations.

== See also ==
- List of Apis mellifera subspecies
