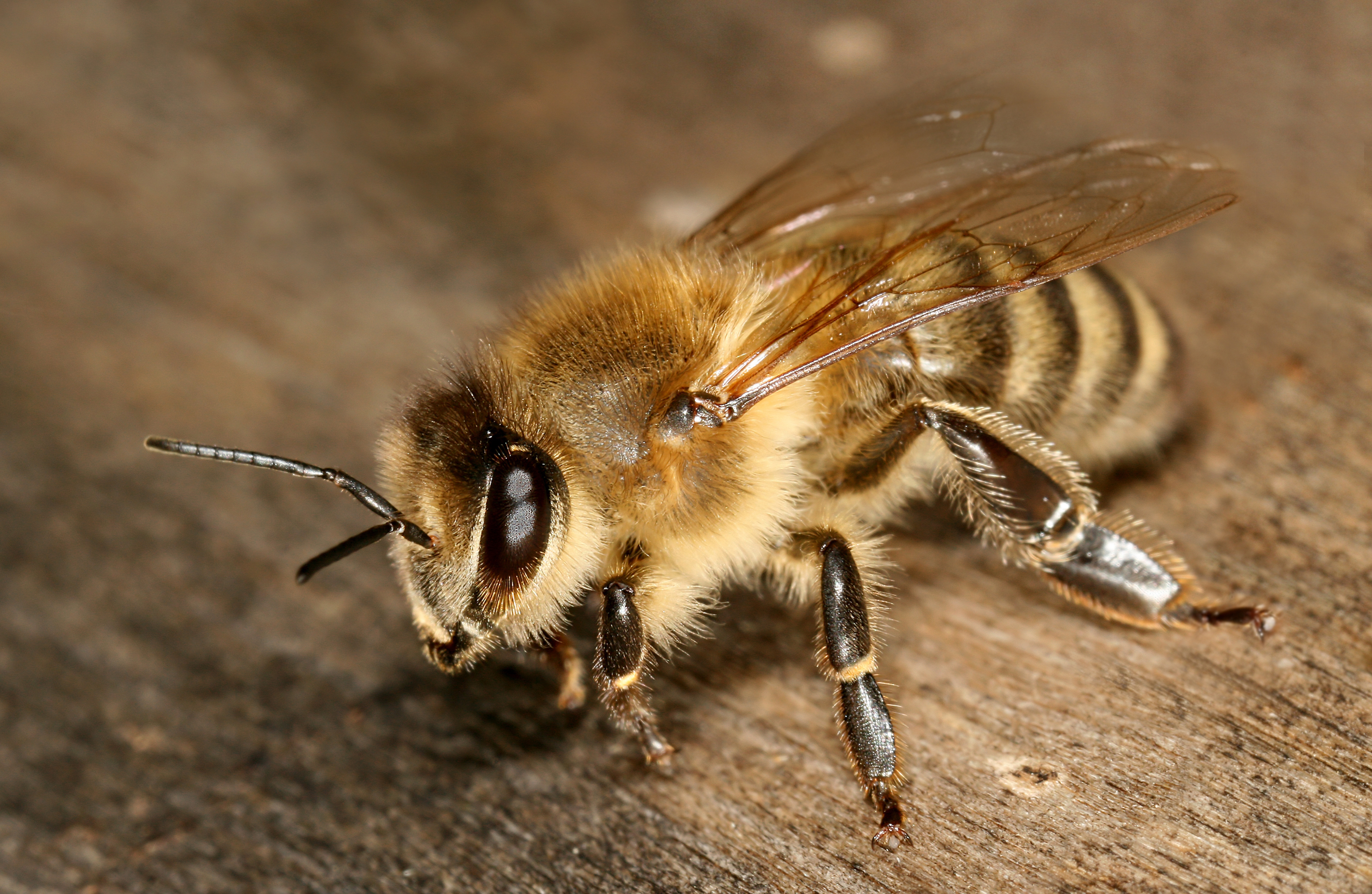

Scientific classification
- Kingdom: Animalia
- Phylum: Arthropoda
- Clade: Pancrustacea
- Class: Insecta
- Order: Hymenoptera
- Family: Apidae
- Genus: Apis
- Species: A. mellifera
- Subspecies: A. m. carnica

Trinomial name
- Apis mellifera carnica Pollman, 1879

Synonyms
- Apis mellifica hymettea Pollmann 1879; Apis mellifera carniolica Koschevnikov 1900 (Emend.); Apis mellifica banatica Grozdanic 1926; Apis mellifera banata Skorikov 1929 (Emend.); Apis mellifera carpatica Barac 1977

= Carniolan honey bee =

Subspecies of honey bee

The Carniolan honey bee (Apis mellifera carnica, Pollmann) is a subspecies of the European honey bee. The Carniolan honey bee is native to Slovenia, southern Austria, and parts of Albania, Croatia, Bosnia and Herzegovina, Montenegro, parts of Serbia, Hungary, parts of Romania, North-East Italy, parts of Poland and European Turkey.

== Origin ==
The Carniolan honey bee is a subspecies of the Western honey bee, that has naturalised and adapted to the Kočevje (Gottschee) sub-region of Carniola (Slovenia), the southern part of the Austrian Alps, Dinarides region, southern Pannonian plain and the northern Balkans. These bees are known as Carniolans, or "Carnies" for short, in English. At present this subspecies is the second most popular among beekeepers (after the Italian bee).

== Qualities ==
It is popular among beekeepers for several reasons, not the least being its ability to defend itself successfully against insect pests while at the same time being extremely gentle in its behavior toward beekeepers. These bees are particularly adept at adjusting worker population to nectar availability. It relies on these rapid adjustments of population levels to rapidly expand worker bee populations after nectar becomes available in the spring, and to rapidly cut off brood production when nectar ceases to be available in quantity. It meets periods of high nectar with high worker populations and consequently stores large quantities of honey and pollen during those periods. They are resistant to some diseases and parasites that can debilitate hives of other subspecies. This honey bee are also popular with beekeepers due to its gentle nature and ability to tolerate colder temperatures. This is due to their DNA as to why they are able to adapt to cold weather more. Carniolan bees are known for their adaptation qualities in adapting to hot weather environments such as Egypt which is normally hot and dry.

== Anatomy and appearance ==
Carniolan honey bees are about the same size as the Italian honey bee, but they are physically distinguished by their generally dusky brown-grey color that is relieved by stripes of a subdued lighter brown color. Their chitin is dark, but it is possible to find lighter colored or brown colored rings and dots on their bodies. They are also known as the "grey bee".

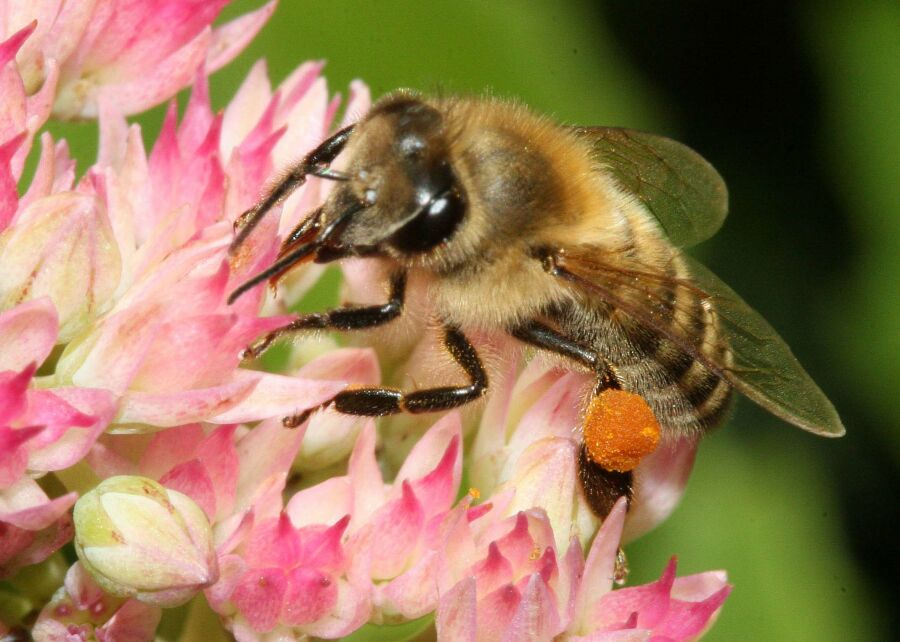
Carnica bee on Hylotelephium 'Herbstfreude' with pollen basket

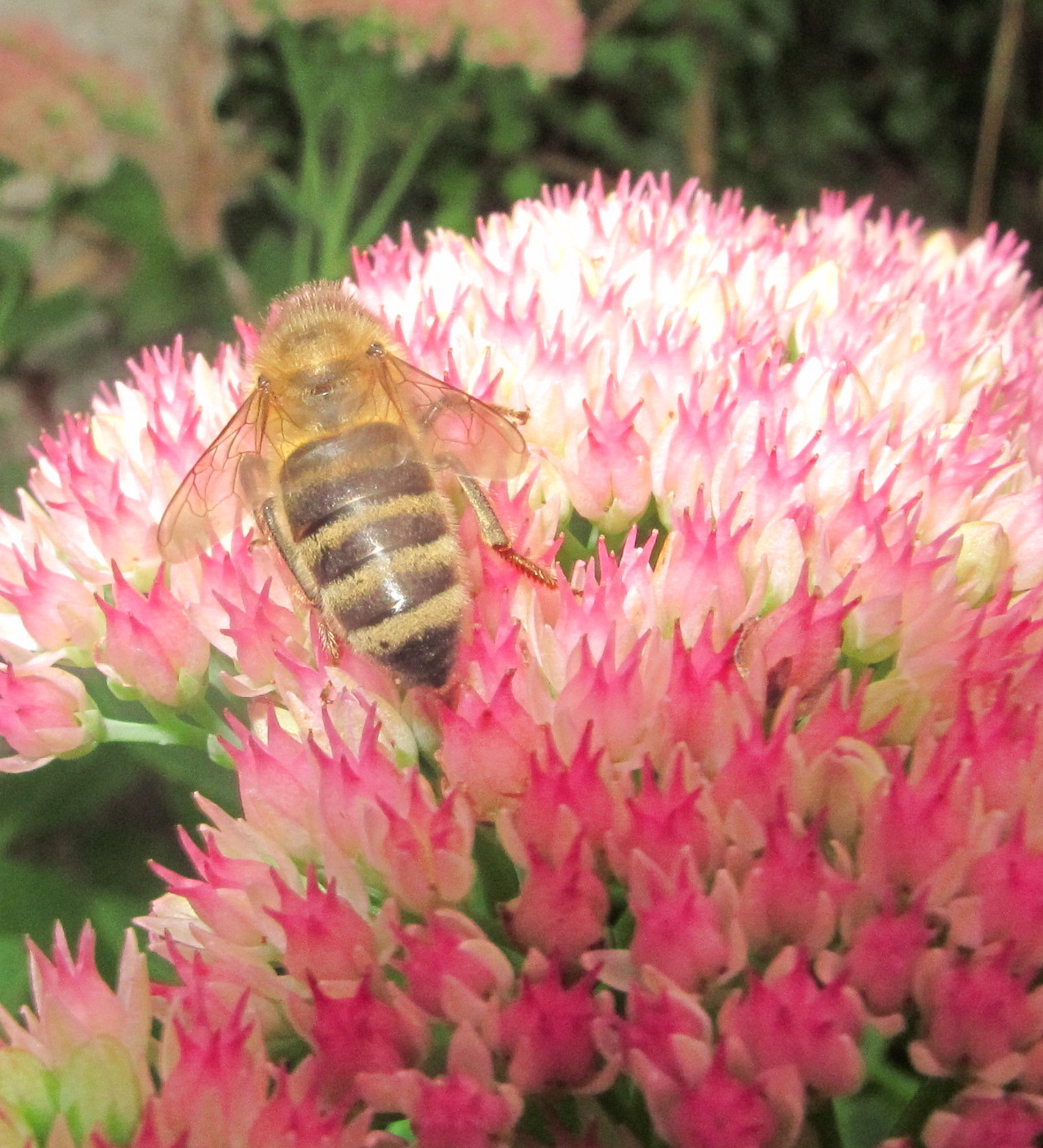
Carnica bee on Hylotelephium 'Herbstfreude'

Carniolan bees are nearly as big and long as the Western European black bees, though their abdomens are much slimmer. Furthermore, the Carniolan bee has a very long tongue (6.5 to 6.7 mm, which is very well adapted for clover), a very high elbow joint and very short hair.

== Character and behavior ==
Strengths

- Gentle and non-aggressive
- Can be kept in populated areas
- Better sense of orientation relative to the Italian honey bee
- Less drifting of bees from one hive to a neighboring hive
- Not as prone to robbing from other hives relative to the Italian honey bee
- Able to overwinter in smaller numbers of winter bees
- Thrifty during Winter, conserving honey stores
- Able to quickly adapt to changes in the environment
- Good for areas with longer winters
- Fast rhythm of brood production and then brood rearing reduction when available forage decreases
- Lower use of propolis
- Increased resistance to brood diseases
- Good build up for areas with strong spring nectar flow and early pollination
- Forage earlier in the morning and later in the evening, and on cooler, wetter days
- Workers live up to 12% longer than other sub-species

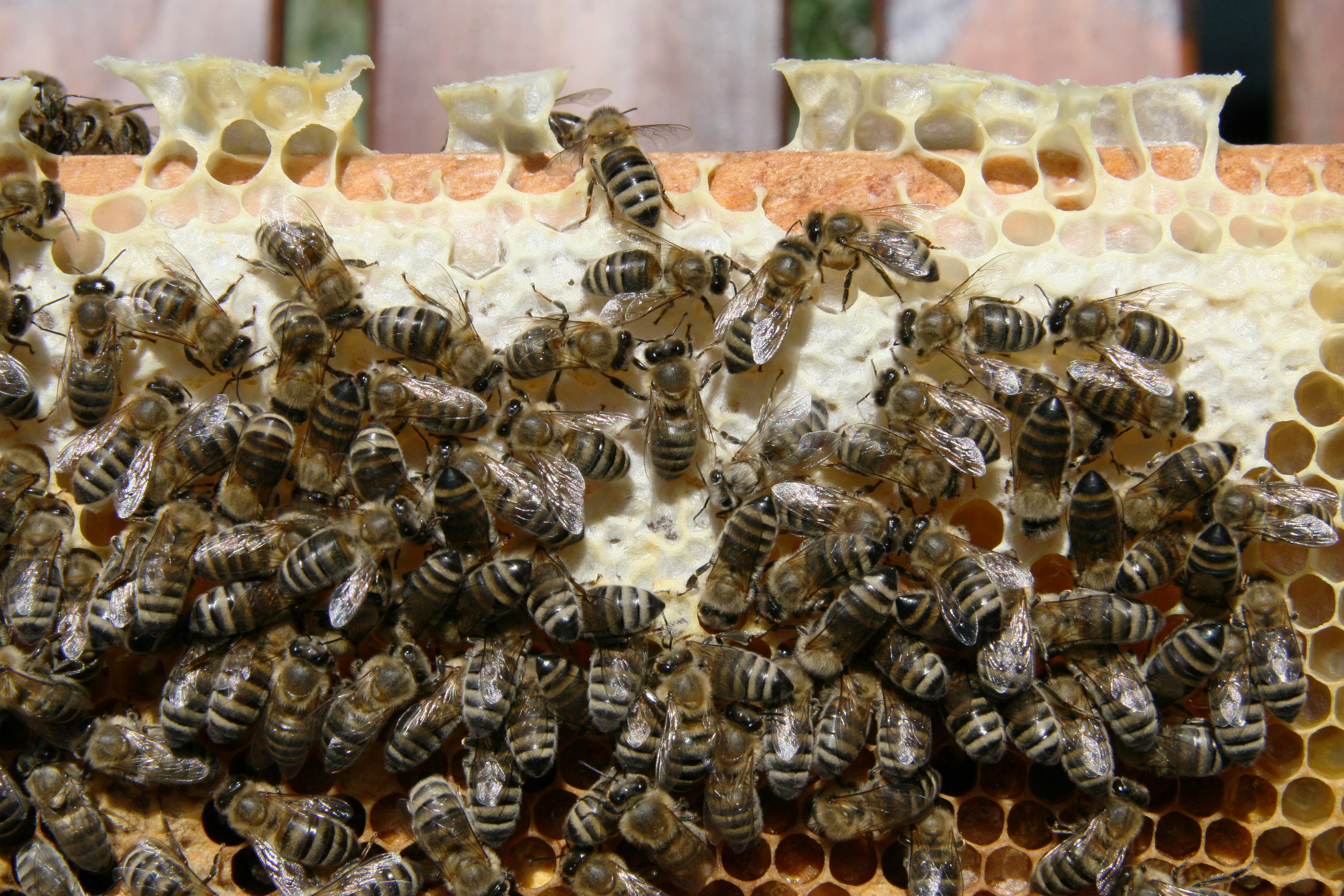
Carniolan bees on comb

== See also ==
- Anton Janša
- Slavonian honey
