= R. O. B. Manley =

- Born: Robert Orlando Beater Manley; 29 May 1887
- Died: 1977 (aged 88–89)
- Occupations: Farmer, Bee Keeper, Inventor, author
- Writing career
- Pen name: R.O.B. Manley

Robert "Bert" Orlando Beater Manley (29 May 1887 – 14 September 1977) was a British farmer and beekeeper, an authority on commercial honey farming and developer of the popular Manley moveable frame hives and frame systems.

== Life ==
Manley was the only child of John Samuel Lake Manley (1850–1930) and his wife Fanny Rose Ada Beater. They were married in April 1886 in Newton Abbot, and Manley was born at Long Hanborough, Oxfordshire, a year later. Ada Manley died in June 1888, aged 27, after a miscarriage. His grandfather, Robert Manley, was the owner occupier of a farm of 280 acres at East Farley, Cheriton Fitzpaine.

From a farming family, Manley began to keep bees in his youth as a sideline. In 1904 a parasite, Acarapis woodi that originated on the Isle of Wight extended over the UK devastating all the native bees and only the Apis mellifera carnica and Apis mellifera ligustica colonies survived. While Brother Adam travelled to Turkey to find substitutes for the native bees for the first Buckfast strain (a very productive bee resistant to the parasite), Manley began breeding Italian bees, and the pair quickly became the most influential bee-keepers in Britain, with Brother Adam concentrating on a breeding programme and Manley developing modern commercial honey farming methods.

In 1918, Manley was living at Woodlands, Sotwell, near Wallingford, Berkshire, and farming Slade End Farm, Brightwell.

In 1948, Manley became the first man to manage 1,000 colonies in England, having kept bees through the fine summers of the 1920s and 1930s. (A. W. Gale of Marlborough, at the height of his business in the 1940s, ran more than two thousand hives).

As well as inventing the Manley frame system (still in common use today), R. O. B. Manley is the source of the practice of feeding sugar to bees in its modern form, stating that "all hives that have been to the moors should be fed 10lb sugar as a precaution against dysentery caused by long confinement during severe winters". This advice is not found in earlier publications (A. Pettigrew 1870, Rev Thomas WM Cowan 1881). Manley adds that while heather honey was not suitable as winter food during periods of confinement, he 'knew of nothing better to encourage a rapid spring build-up'.

R.O.B.'s family continued to keep and study bees. The studies carried out by Dr Robyn Manley are of particular interest with regard to viral disease risk to pollinating insects.

Manley died in Benson, Oxfordshire, in September 1977, leaving an estate valued at £12,278.

== Thymol Treatment ==
R. O. B. Manley propagated the idea of using thymol in syrup intended for winter feeding to prevent fermentation and the growth of mould. Manley's thymol recipe has also proven useful in controlling Varroa mites.

Manley's recipe has become a standard and even if the requirement is for a stronger solution, this is often specified as '3x Manley strength' or '4x Manley strength'. His original recipe was one ounce of thymol crystals dissolved in five fluid ounces of surgical spirit to make the stock solution. Then half a fluid ounce of this mixture was added to 1 Cwt (112 lbs) of sugar, which he dissolved in 7 imperial gallons (8.75 US Gal.) of water for direct use as winter feed.

== Bibliography ==
- Honey Production in the British Isles (1936)
- Honey Farming (1946)
- Bee-Keeping in Britain (1948)
- The Practical Bee Guide – a Manual of Modern Beekeeping (1949 with J. G Digges)
