= Cary W. Hartman =

American academic (1859–1947)

- Born: May 19, 1859; Marathon, Ohio, U.S.
- Died: 1947
- Occupation: Academic
- Known for: Lecturer and beekeeper

Cary Winfield Hartman (1859–1947) was an academic who published and lectured throughout the American Mid-West on the Native Americans for 25 years before becoming a well known beekeeping enthusiast in California.

== Life ==
Cary W. Hartman was born May 19, 1859, in Marathon, Ohio, to Albert G. and Margaret Steel Hartman. Cary studied at the National Normal University in Lebanon, Ohio. In 1891 he moved to Detroit where he studied elocution at the Detroit Training School of Elocution. He married Etta Shaw Hartman and had a daughter "Little Lina" In 1915, Hartman moved to Oakland, California where he quickly became a beekeeping enthusiast, community leader, and publisher contributing to the recognition of the west-coasts' beekeeping, likely because of his friendship with Amos Root. Cary Winfield Hartman died 1947.

== Contributions to Studies on The American Indian ==
Published for his works on the American Indian, Hartman contributed over 1000 artifacts for evaluation and publication. and was once praised as "The People's Entertainer." In 1894, Hartman was being managed by Detroit Lyceum Bureau.

=== Works and Lectures ===
- The Mound Builders of The Mississippi Valley
- Indian Orators and Oratory – January 28, 1906 – Buffalo Historical Society
- My Life Among The Indians - May 5, 1907 - Buffalo Historical Society
- Exponent of Indian Thought, Life & Legends, with interesting lectures therein at Foresta, Yosemite National Park - 1917
- Hiawatha: The Indian passion play : as originally arranged for production with Indians by Cary W Hartman (1914) - Text
- Correspondence with Joseph Keppler - "The Indian as I found him"

== Beekeeping ==
During his beekeeping career he founded The Alameda County Beekeepers' Association and remained as president, was president, secretary, and chairman of The California State Beekeepers' Association, and was a county apiary inspector for Alameda County, California.

== The Alameda Beekeepers' Association ==
Mr. Hartman began his beekeeping notoriety by founding California's first county beekeeping association in Alameda County, California in 1916, The Alameda County Beekeepers' Association (ACBA). He was president for the ACBA until the late 1930s,.

== Bees & Honey ==
Mr. Hartman created and was editor in chief of the periodical Bees & Honey starting in 1920 until George York took over editing it from Spokane, Washington.

== California State Beekeepers' Association ==
In 1921, Mr. Hartman was Chairman of the Program Committee for the California State Beekeepers' Association. While hosting the 1921 annual meeting of the California State Beekeepers' Association in Oakland, California, Mr. Hartman was unanimously elected as President of the California State Beekeepers' Association. He was reelected to president in 1922. While president, he helped to bring honey consumption to the forefront of the California economy, encouraging the governor of California, William Stephens, to recognize "Honey Week" (February 6–11, 1922) as a promotion for apiarists in the state. Mr. Hartman was Secretary to the California State Beekeepers' Association in 1932.

== Alameda County ==
Mr. Hartman served as an Alameda County (CA) Apiary Inspector in 1922.

== Writings & further contributions to periodicals ==
Mr. Hartman contributed to periodicals, including "George W. York Library of Apiculture of The University of California" in The Beekeepers' Review

== Legacy ==
Hartman was recognized as a prominent beekeeper and continued to educate well into his old age.
