= C. C. Miller =

American beekeeper (1831–1920)

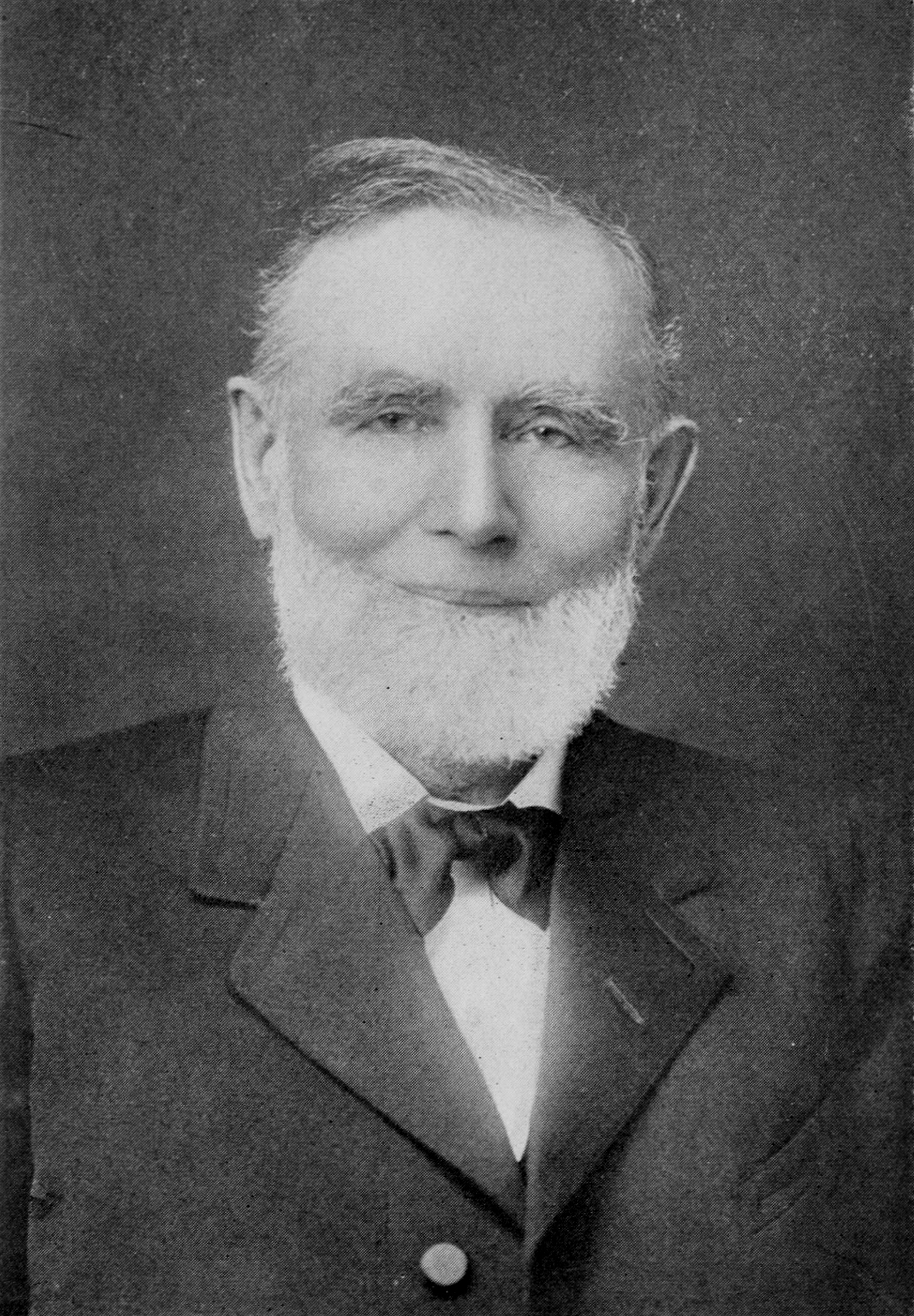
- Born: Charles C. Miller; June 10, 1831; Ligonier, Pennsylvania
- Died: September 4, 1920 (aged 89)
- Occupation: beekeeper
- Notable work: Fifty Years Among the Bees; A Thousand Answers to Beekeeping Questions

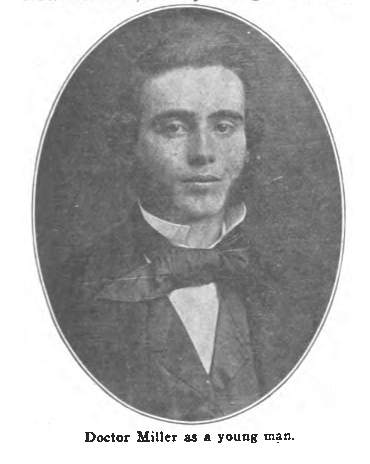
Doctor Miller as a young man

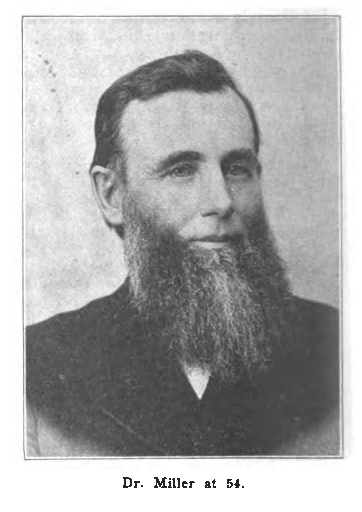
Dr. Miller at age 54

Charles C. Miller (June 10, 1831 – September 4, 1920) was an American practical commercial beekeeper who specialized in comb honey production. He was originally a physician, but gave up that profession to keep bees and to write about beekeeping. His books include A Thousand Answers to Beekeeping Questions and Fifty Years Among the Bees. For many years he was also a popular advice columnist for the American Bee Journal and composer of various "bee" songs.

== Early life ==
Charles C. Miller (generally referred to as C. C.) was born in Ligonier, Pennsylvania on 10 June 1831. Miller's father, Johnson J. Miller, died when he was ten years old, leaving a family of six and little money. As a young man, Miller worked his way through grammar school (taking three years off to help support the family) and eventually moved from his native Pennsylvania to Schenectady, New York, where he worked his way through college.

Miller writes:

This last undertaking was a bit reckless, for when I arrived at Schenectady I had only about thirty dollars, with nothing to rely on except what I might pick up by the way to help me in college. I had a horror of being in debt, and so was on the alert for any work, no matter what its nature, so it was honest, by which I could earn something to help carry me through.

I had learned just enough of ornamental penmanship to be able to write German text [Miller’s mother, Phoebe Miller, was from Germany, and he likely spoke German from childhood.], and so got $44.00 for filling in the names of 88 diplomas at two commencements. I taught singing school; I worked at Prof. Jackson’s garden at seven and a half cents an hour; raised a crop of potatoes; clerked at a town election; peddled maps; I got $100.00 for teaching a term at an academy. Neither were my studies slighted during my course, which was shown by my taking the highest honor attainable, Phi Beta Kappa, which, however, was equally taken by a number of my class.

— Dr. C. C. Miller

With such sacrifice, hard work, and dedication to become a physician, one assumes Miller would have easily made a career of medicine. Unfortunately, his disposition did not allow him to follow through with a practice. As a physician, Miller suffered greatly from stress. He wrote that he worried constantly that he would misdiagnose a patient and prescribe an incorrect medicine. “It did not take more than a year for me to find out that I had not a sufficient stock of health myself to take care of that of others, especially as I was morbidly anxious lest some lack of judgment on my part should prove a serious matter with some one under my care. So with much regret I gave up my chosen profession.”

Soon after, Miller married, taught voice and instrumental music, and became the principal of a public school. Later, he became decided to pursue a career in beekeeping when a bee swarm stumbled onto his porch.

== Beekeeping ==
Beginning as an amateur beekeeper as the result of a swarm that his wife hived into a sugar barrel when it landed on their porch in 1861, Miller expanded his business steadily. By 1878, Miller made his living from keeping bees. He eventually settled in Illinois. Miller expanded his honey farm to over 300 colonies of bees, and became North America's largest producer of comb honey.

== Writings ==
Writing part memoir, part bee culture, Miller began his personal account of the honey business in 1886 with A Year Among the Bees, in which he announced he had "made the production of honey his exclusive business" for eight years. This was expanded into Forty Years Among the Bees (1903, 2nd ed. 1906), then into his classic, Fifty Years Among the Bees (1911), culminating with A Thousand Answers to Beekeeping Questions (1917). Miller also edited the American Bee Journal and produced a popular monthly advice column answering reader's questions. In honor of his fifty years of writing about apiculture and his gift of his personal beekeeping library, the University of Wisconsin named its apicultural library the Dr. Charles C. Miller Memorial Apicultural Library.

== Music ==
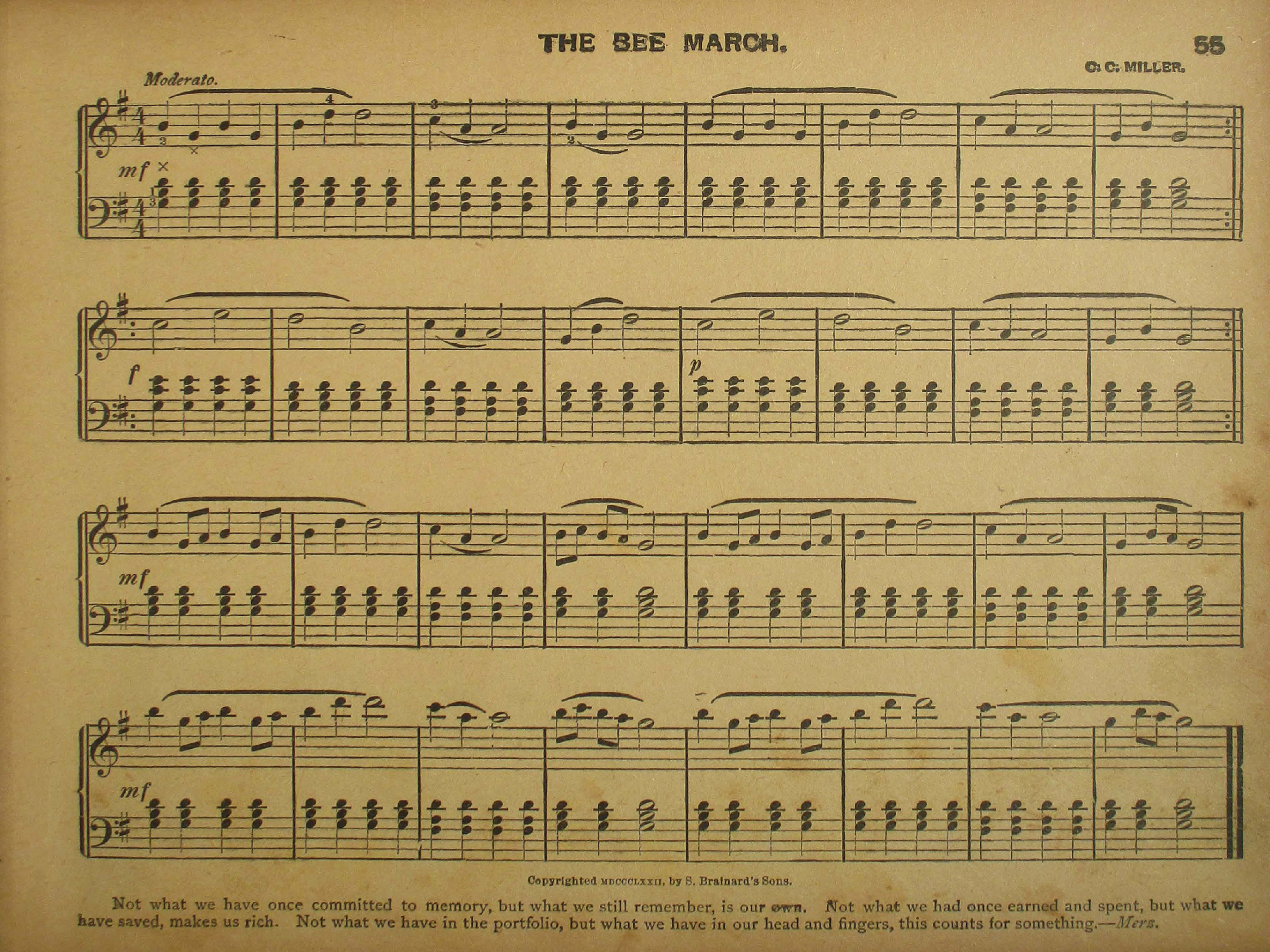
The Bee March

Miller was a musician, a composer of both church and lay tunes. We have from him several beekeepers' songs, the stanzas of which were written by poet-beekeeper, Eugene Secor, of Iowa: "The Hum of the Bees in the Apple Tree Tops," "The Beekeepers’ Reunion Song," "Dot Happy Beeman," "Beekeepers' Convention Song," and "Spring Time Joys." These were compiled and printed by George W. York as pamphlet Songs of Beedom.

He also composed The Bee March which was included in music selections for the organ.
