= Karl Kehrle =

Benedictine monk, apiculturist 1898–1996

Karl Kehrle OSB
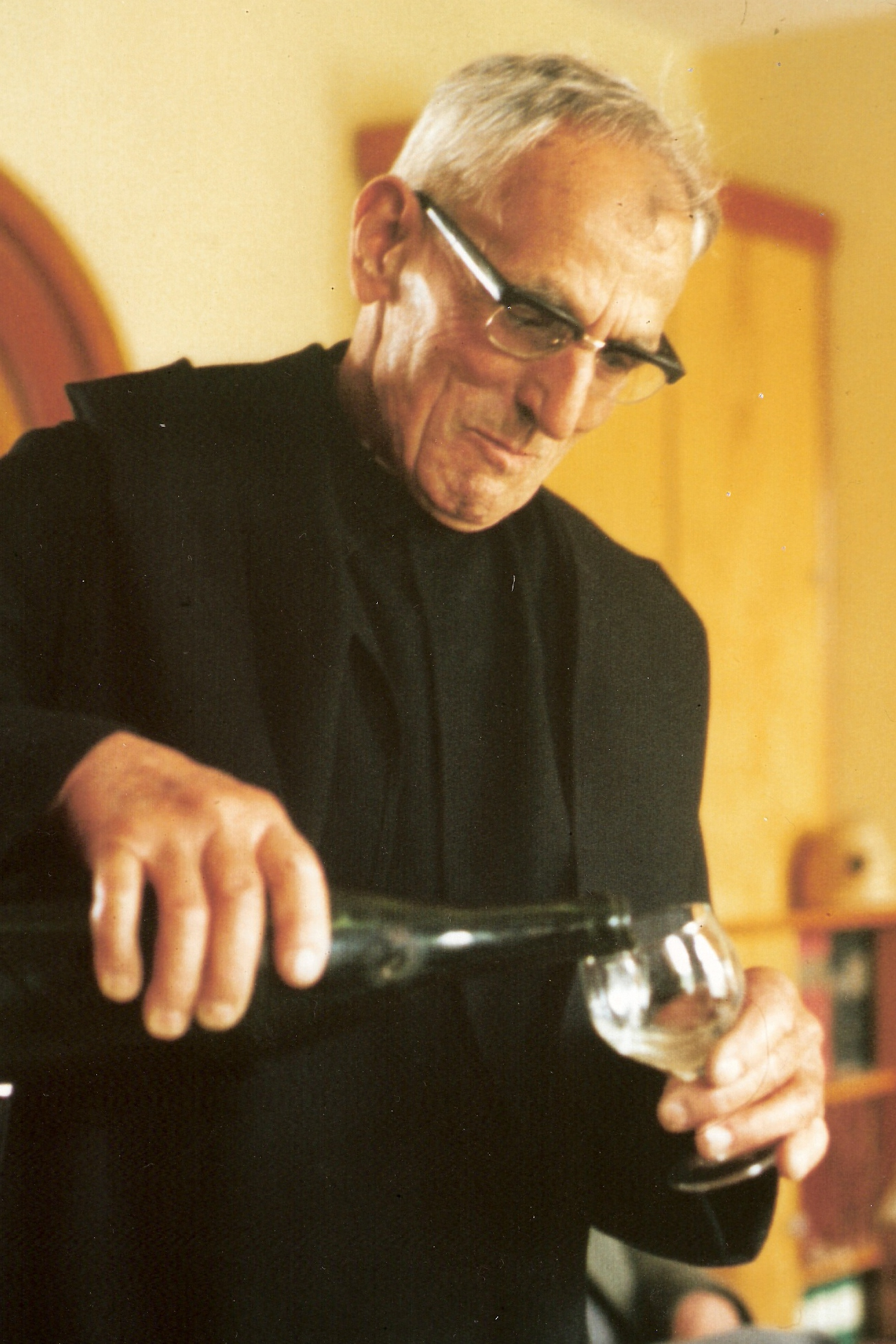
- 1991 photo
- Born: 28 August 1898; Mittelbiberach, Germany
- Died: 1 September 1996 (aged 98); Buckfast, Devon, England, UK
- Other names: Brother Adam
- Known for: Developer of the Buckfast bee
- Awards: Order of the British Empire, German Bundesverdienstkreuz
- Scientific career
- Fields: Apiculture

Karl Kehrle OSB OBE (3 August 1898, Mittelbiberach, Germany – 1 September 1996, Buckfast, Devonshire, England, UK), known as Brother Adam, was a Benedictine monk, beekeeper, and an authority on bee breeding, developer of the Buckfast bee.

"He was unsurpassed as a breeder of bees. He talked to them, he stroked them. He brought to the hives a calmness that, according to those who saw him at work, the sensitive bees responded to." – The Economist, 14 September 1996

== Biography ==
Due to health problems Kehrle was sent by his mother at the age of 11 from Germany to Buckfast Abbey, where he joined the order (becoming Brother Adam) and in 1915 started his beekeeping activity. Two years before, a parasite, Acarapis woodi that originated on the Isle of Wight had started to extend over the country, devastating all the native bees, and in 1916 it reached the abbey, killing 30 of the 46 bee colonies.

He travelled to Turkey to find resistant native bees for selective breeding. In 1917 he created the first Buckfast strain, a very productive bee resistant to the parasite. On 1 September 1919 Kehrle was put in charge of the abbey's apiary, after the retirement of Brother Columban. In 1925 and after some studies on the disposition of the beehives he installed his famous breeding station in Dartmoor, an isolated model to obtain selected crossings, which still works today. From 1950 and for more than a decade Kehrle continued his gradual improvement of the Buckfast bee by analysing and crossing bees from places all over Europe, the Near East and North Africa.

In 1964 he was elected member of the Board of the Bee Research Association, which later became the International Bee Research Association. He continued his studies of the Buckfast bee and his travels during the 1970s and received several awards, including appointment as an Officer of the Order of the British Empire (1973) and the German Bundesverdienstkreuz (1974).

On 2 October 1987 he was appointed Honorary doctor by the Faculty of Agriculture of the Swedish University of Agricultural Sciences while in search of a bee on the Kilimanjaro mountains in Tanzania and Kenya, which deeply moved him and he saw as the official recognition of the scientific nature of his research. Two years later he was appointed Honorary doctor by the Exeter University in England.

On 2 February 1992, aged 93, he resigned his post as beekeeper at the Abbey and was permitted to spend some months in his home town Mittelbiberach with his niece, Maria Kehrle. From 1993 onwards, he lived a retired life back at Buckfast Abbey, and became the oldest monk of the English Benedictine Congregation. In 1995, at age 97, he moved to a nearby nursing home where he died on 1 September 1996.

== Awards ==
=== Honorary Doctorates ===
- 1987 Swedish University of Agricultural Sciences
- 1989 Exeter University in England.

=== Other ===
- 1973 Order of the British Empire
- 1974 Bundesverdienstkreuz, Germany
