= Hive frame =

Element of modern movable-comb beehive

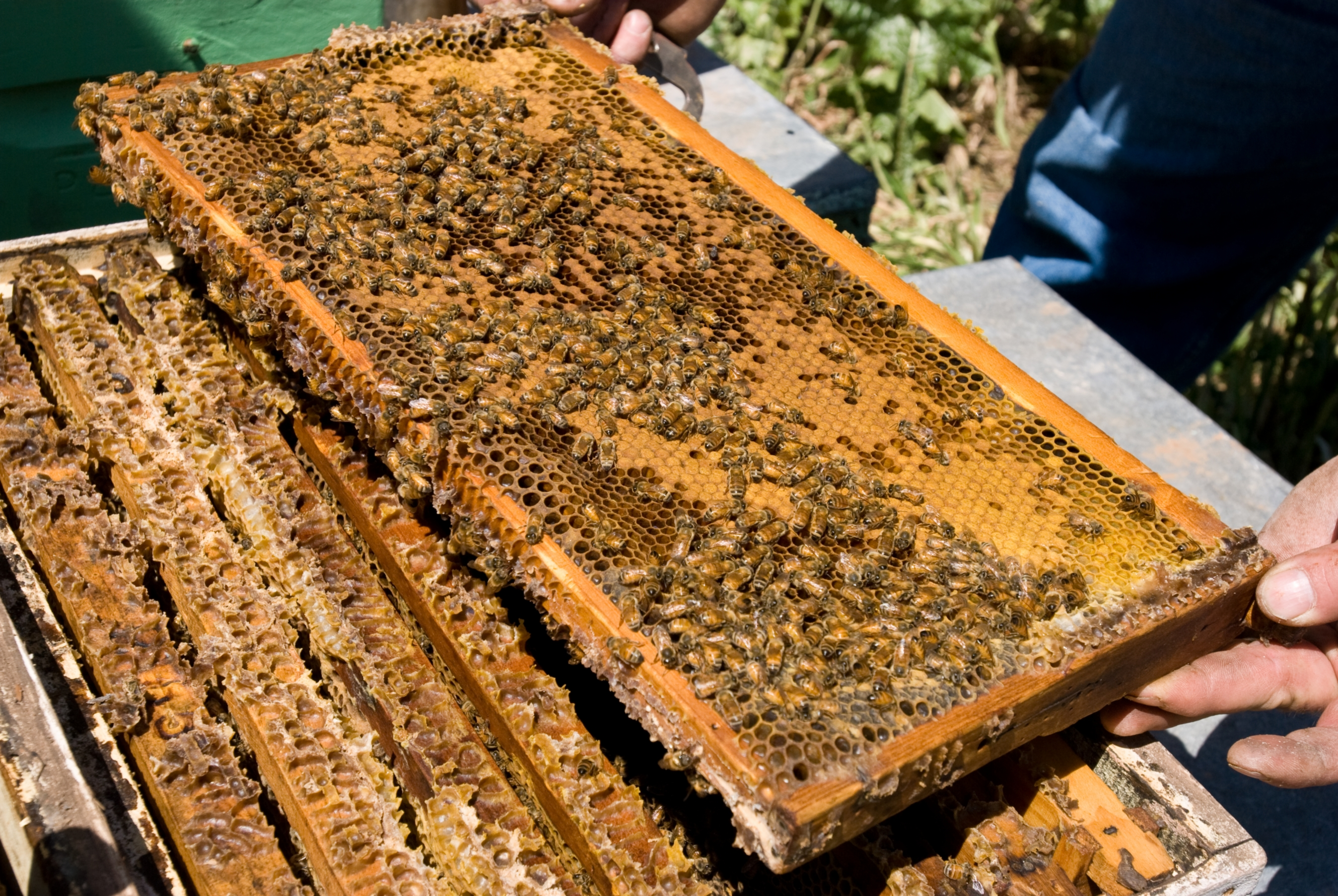
- A frame covered with comb and bees
- Classification: Beekeeping
- Used with: Wax foundation Langstroth hive
- Inventor: Petro Prokopovych; Johann Dzierzon
- Manufacturer: various

A hive frame or honey frame is a structural element in a beehive that holds the honeycomb or brood comb within the hive enclosure or box. The hive frame is a key part of the modern movable-comb hive. It can be removed in order to inspect the bees for disease or to extract the excess honey.

== History ==
In 1814, Ukrainian beekeeper Petro Prokopovych invented the world's first beehive which used hive frames. Early prototypes had a large distance between frames, and the frames lay on supporting strips of wood. As a result, the frames were cross-attached by burr comb and propolized to the supporting strips and were difficult to remove. In Prokopovych's design, the frames were placed only in the honey chamber. In the brood chamber, the bees built the combs in free style.

Johann Dzierzon described the correct distance between combs in the brood chamber as 1½ inches from the center of one bar to the center of the next. In 1848, Dzierzon introduced grooves into the hive's side walls replacing the strips of wood to hang top bars. The grooves were 8 mm (1/3 in) wide and met the distance requirements for a bee space.

In May 1852, August von Berlepsch in Germany designed a movable frame. On 5 October 1852, in the United States, L. L. Langstroth patented a new hive with movable frames under US patent # US9300A. Today, the Langstroth hive is the most common design in many parts of the world. In the UK the national hive is more commonly used. A smaller hive, the Smith hive is often used in Scotland, especially when bees are taken to the Heather moors. Historically the larger Dadant hive was used in most of Europe. All of these hives use movable frames of various numbers and sizes.

== Specifications ==
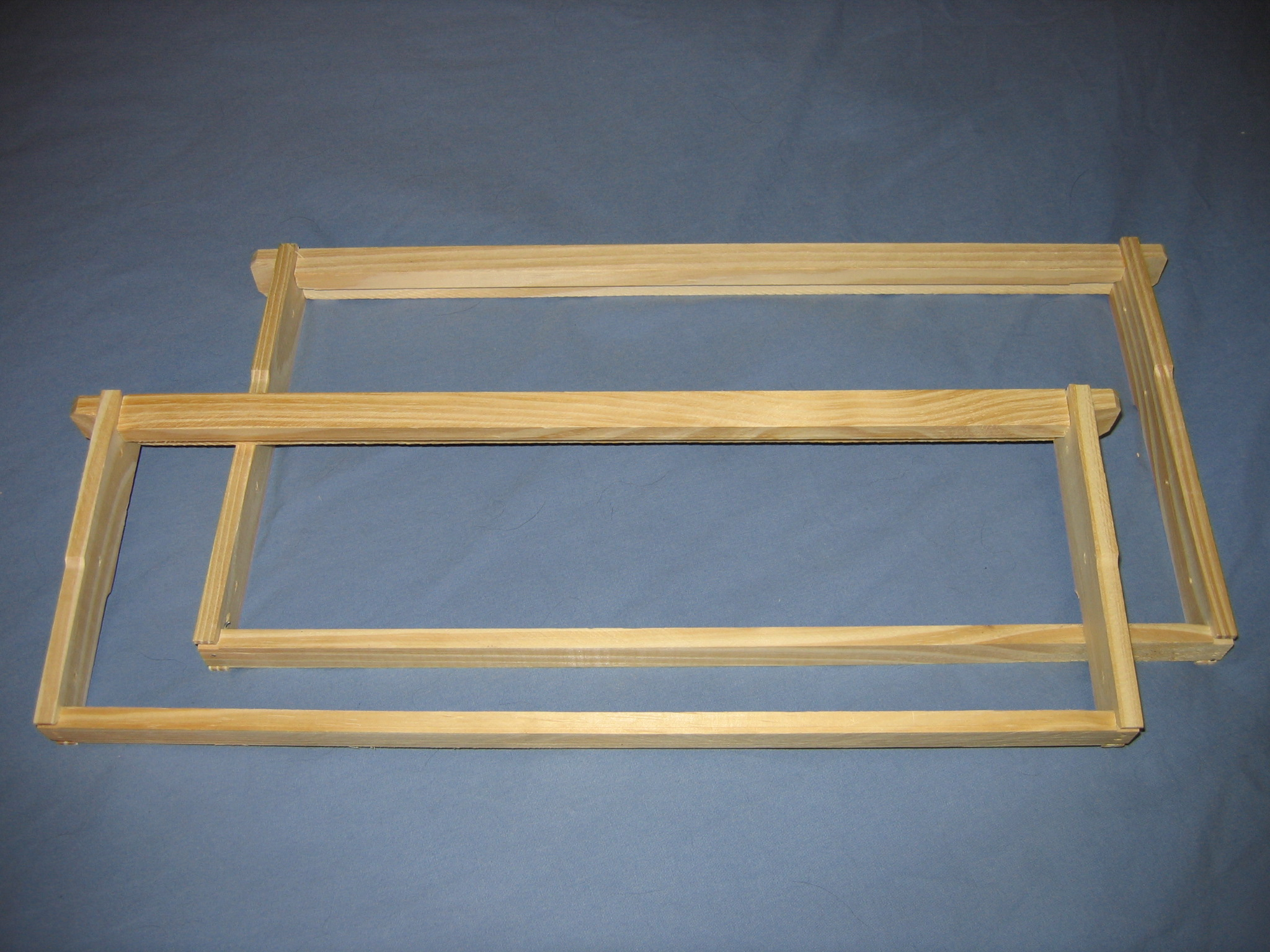
Empty Langstroth hive frames with thick top bars

A Langstroth hive – stackable boxes opened from the top – is usually made to hold eight or ten frames per box, spaced about 1 1/2 inches (38 mm) center to center. The frames are made of wood or plastic.

The dimensions of the frames also vary. Various sizes have been given their own names. Confusingly, the "Langstroth frame size" is one; minor variations on it are widely used in modern US beekeeping. The Dadant frame is larger, others such as the BS National Beehive are smaller.

In the Langstroth frame design, the top bar length is some 19 inches (48 cm). Boxes may be of three different depths, and these depths may also vary somewhat between manufacturers.

- Deep: 9 1/8 inches (230 mm)
- Medium: 6 1/4 inches (160 mm)
- Shallow: 5 3/8 inches (140 mm)

The frame is made of:

- One top bar: It has two ears from which the frame hangs in the hive box. These are the only contact points with the box. Since L. L. Langstroth (around 1851), the middle part of the top bar is thicker, usually twice as thick as the ears (see picture above). It significantly reduces the building of wax over and between the frames. In addition, the frames are also better to grip. It can have a groove on the bottom in which the wax foundation or strips fits or an edge (usually made of wood) on which the bees attach the wax. Horizontal top-bar hives are associated with the use of movable top bars without frames, usually hold in a larger single box.
- Two side bars: They are about as thin as the ears and usually have three or four small holes to attach the wax foundation.
- One bottom bar: It is as thin as the side bars and usually has a groove in which the wax foundation sits.

The bars may have furniture – hooks or eyes – to allow for the attachment of wires to brace the frame together.

Frames can be outfitted with wax foundation, starter strips or left empty for bees to build the entire comb.

== Other frames ==
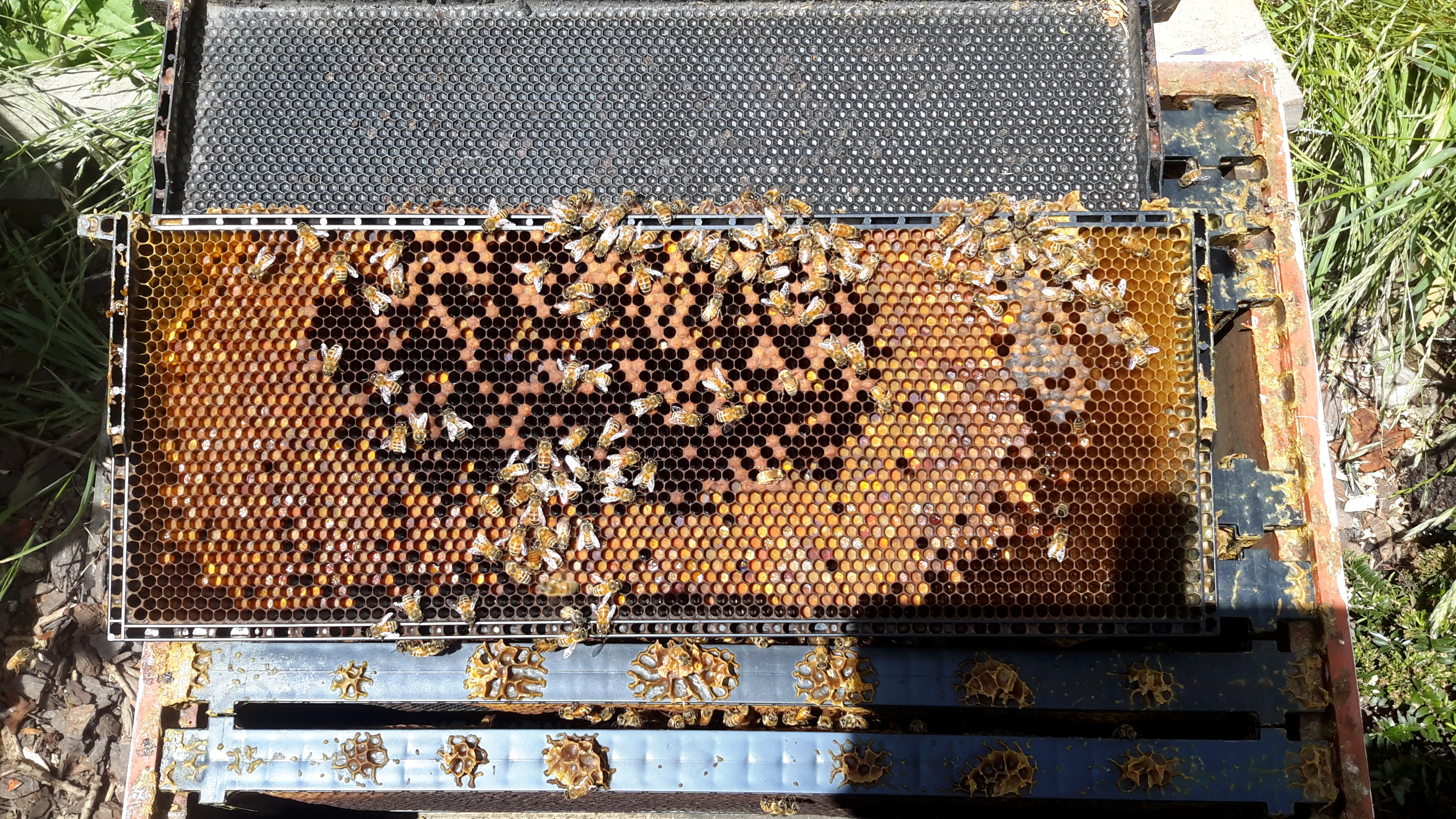
Plastic frames with and without comb

- Plastic frames: They are injected-moulded out of plastic and come in various colors. They usually come with built in plastic foundation molded as one piece with cells stamped to a specific size. The colors usually are used to distinguish types of frames within a manufacture's product line (example: green for frames with drone size foundation cells).
- Queen rearing frames: Specialty frames such as cell bar frames are used to raise new queens. The queen cups are attached vertically to bars to encourage bees to build queen cells. Once these cells are capped, the beekeeper moves them each to a queenless colony for adoption.
- Drone Trap frames: Some beekeepers have designed frames specifically to encourage bees to build drone brood in order cut it out as part of an Integrated Pest Management (IPM) plan in the fight against Varroa destructor.

== See also ==
- Beehive
- Buckfast bee
- Charles Dadant
- Langstroth hive
- Wax foundation
