= Wax foundation =

Artificial honeycomb structure for bees

Wax Foundation
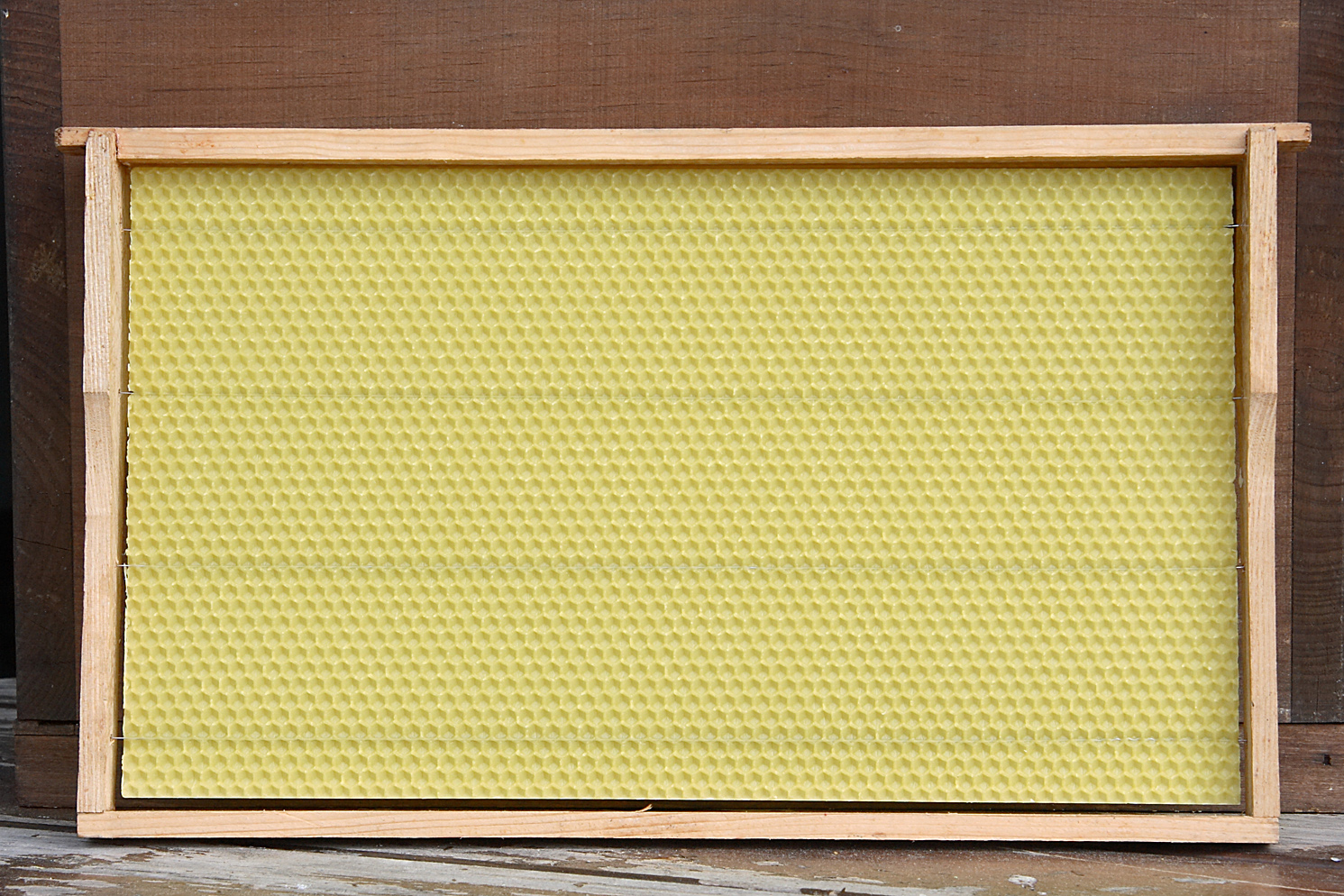
- Wax foundation with wires inserted into a frame
- Classification: Beekeeping
- Types: small cell large cell wired
- Used with: Langstroth hive Hive frame
- Inventor: Johannes Mehring
- Manufacturer: various

Wax foundation or honeycomb base is a plate made of wax forming the base of one honeycomb. It is used in beekeeping to give the bees a foundation on which they can build the honeycomb. Wax foundation is considered one of the most important inventions in modern beekeeping.

== History ==
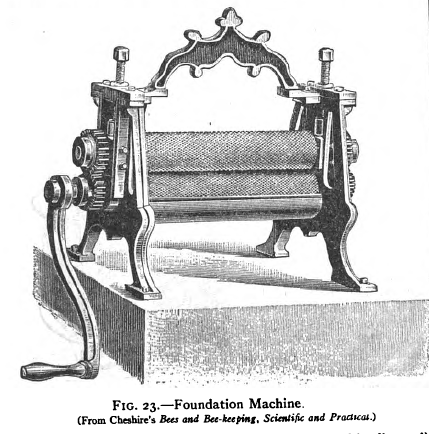
Foundation press in the Encyclopaedia Britannica (1911)

Wax foundation was invented by German Johannes Mehring in 1857, a few years after Langstroth designed and patented the Langstroth hive on October 5, 1852. Mehring's wax foundation had only the bottom of the cells, and today's base with the foundation of the cells was invented by US beekeeper Samuel Wagner. The Langstroth patent did not call for foundation and let the bees build their own comb.

At first, wax foundations were made in the wax foundation press. The first presses were made of wood, while later presses could be made of plaster, cement, and finally metal, which are the ones used today. Wagner also invented the wax foundation rollers, but never perfected them; the first usable rollers were made by Amos Root and precise mechanic Alva Washburn in 1875. In 1895. Detroit inventor Edward Weed invented rollers that can make wax foundation in a continuous roll.

== Use ==
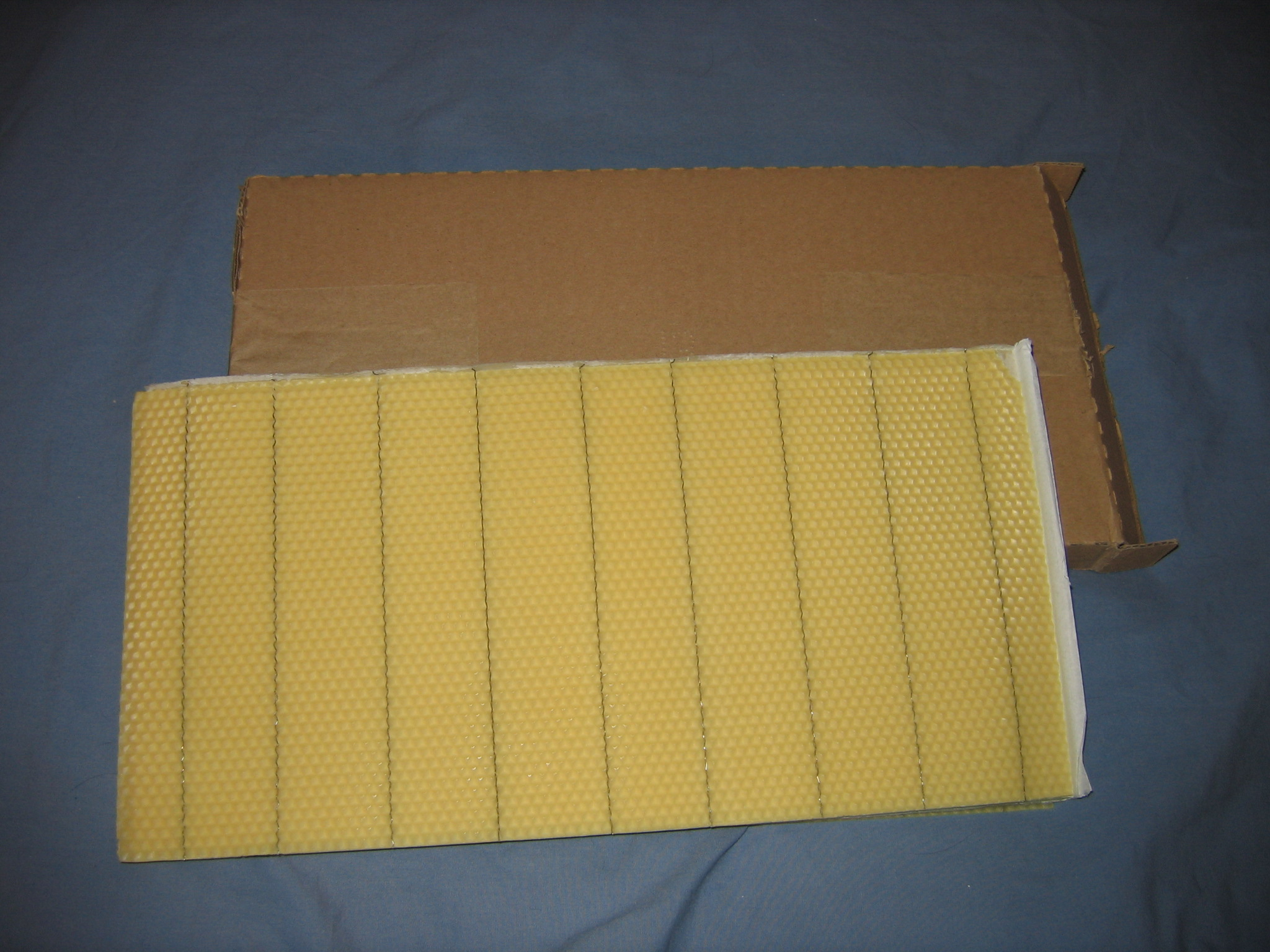
Sheet of foundation out of a cardboard box

Wax or plastic foundation is inserted into a wooden frame through the top and is usually connected to the side bars with wire. It is not used in foundationless frames or in plastic frames where the foundation is made of plastic and is part of the frame itself. Foundation is not usually used in top-bar applications (where no frames are used) such as Top Bar Hives or Warre Hives except sometimes as starter strips.

Wax foundation has some advantages over letting bees build their own comb:

- It provides a guide for bees to build straight comb. Without foundation, the beekeeper runs the risk of having comb built outside the Hive frame when they start, preventing its easy removal for inspection.
- Foundation built comb is usually stronger in part due to the wiring embedded in the wax. This allows for centrifuge extraction.
- Foundation allows beekeepers to increase the size of the cells on the honeycomb. By stamping bigger cells on the foundation than what bees would naturally build, the beekeeper is guiding bees to build bigger cells, increasing the size of worker bees as well as the volume of the cells for honey storage. Most foundation being stamped with cells measuring 5.4 millimetres (0.21 in) while the naturally built worker cell measures 4.6 millimetres (0.18 in) to 5.1 millimetres (0.20 in) that leads to an increase of a linear increase of 110% of the original size and a volume increase of 157% of the original size.

For these reasons, foundation had been used extensively in commercial operations.

Recently there has been a large movement toward foundationless beekeeping by hobbyists for various reasons. Some of which are listed below:

- Varroa: With the expansion of Varroa destructor around the world, some believe that natural cell size helps bees combat this pest. Cutting out drone cells is also an effective way in an Integrated Pest Management (IPM) plan to fight varroa.
- Chemicals in the wax: Most beekeepers purchase their foundation from beekeeping suppliers. In addition to honey, beekeepers also need pollen and nectar from their colonies. Honey contains vitamins and other valuable nutrients for bees. The cost of honey, including beeswax, is variable depending on how many of these components are used and where they are purchased. The price of honey, with a wide range of beekeepers' items, is also variable. These suppliers manufacture these sheets of foundation with wax purchased from various beekeeping operations which may have used chemicals or worked near fields where chemicals were sprayed. With an increase awareness for pesticides and their impact on bees as well as the organic and natural beekeeping movements, some beekeepers are concerned with the traceability of the wax used.
- Cost and/or time: The foundation needs to be manufactured. The beekeeper can make it or purchase it and this leads to him or her spending time and or money on foundation or equipment to manufacture it.
- Natural Cell size: Comb is not uniform. Natural worker cells range from 4.6 millimetres (0.18 in) to 5.1 millimetres (0.20 in) and Drone cells range from 6.4 millimetres (0.25 in) to 6.6 millimetres (0.26 in). This means that the bees have to adapt the foundation to build drone cells. With the advance in research, the importance of drones being present in the hive had led some beekeepers to let the bees built their own comb in the spirit of natural beekeeping.
- Production of raw honeycomb: Since the comb will be cut out, it is easier to not have any wires in the comb. It is also better to not have chemicals (pesticides) in the wax if it is going to be used for human consumption.

A frame has to be wired so that the wax foundation could be inserted into it. The foundation is then soldered with the wire by using a spur embedder or electric current. Also extant are wax foundations with embedded wire that only need to be inserted into the frame.

Wax foundations are made in various sizes, depending on the frame they will be inserted into. If needed, roller knife is used to cut wax foundations.

== See also ==
- Beehive
- Beeswax
- Hive frame
- Langstroth hive
- Top bar beehive
