= Cloak (disambiguation) =

A cloak is a type of loose garment that is worn over indoor clothing.

Cloak may also refer to:

- Cloak of invisibility, in fiction
- Cloak and Dagger (characters), Marvel Comics character
- Cloak, a Star Trek: Section 31 novel
- Cloak and cloaking, IRC terms related to hostmasks
- Cloaking, a search engine optimization technique
- Cloaking device, a previously science-fiction, stealth system
- A character in the 2006 Disney animated film The Wild
- Ketonet, a biblical garment used by Israelite priests
- Cloak (brand), a designer clothing brand
- Cloaks (Over the Edge), a 1998 supplement for the role-playing game Over the Edge
- Frank V. C. Cloak (1876–1953), American bishop

== See also ==
- Cloake (surname)
- Cloke (surname)
