= Langstroth hive =

Vertically modular beehive with hung brood and honey frames

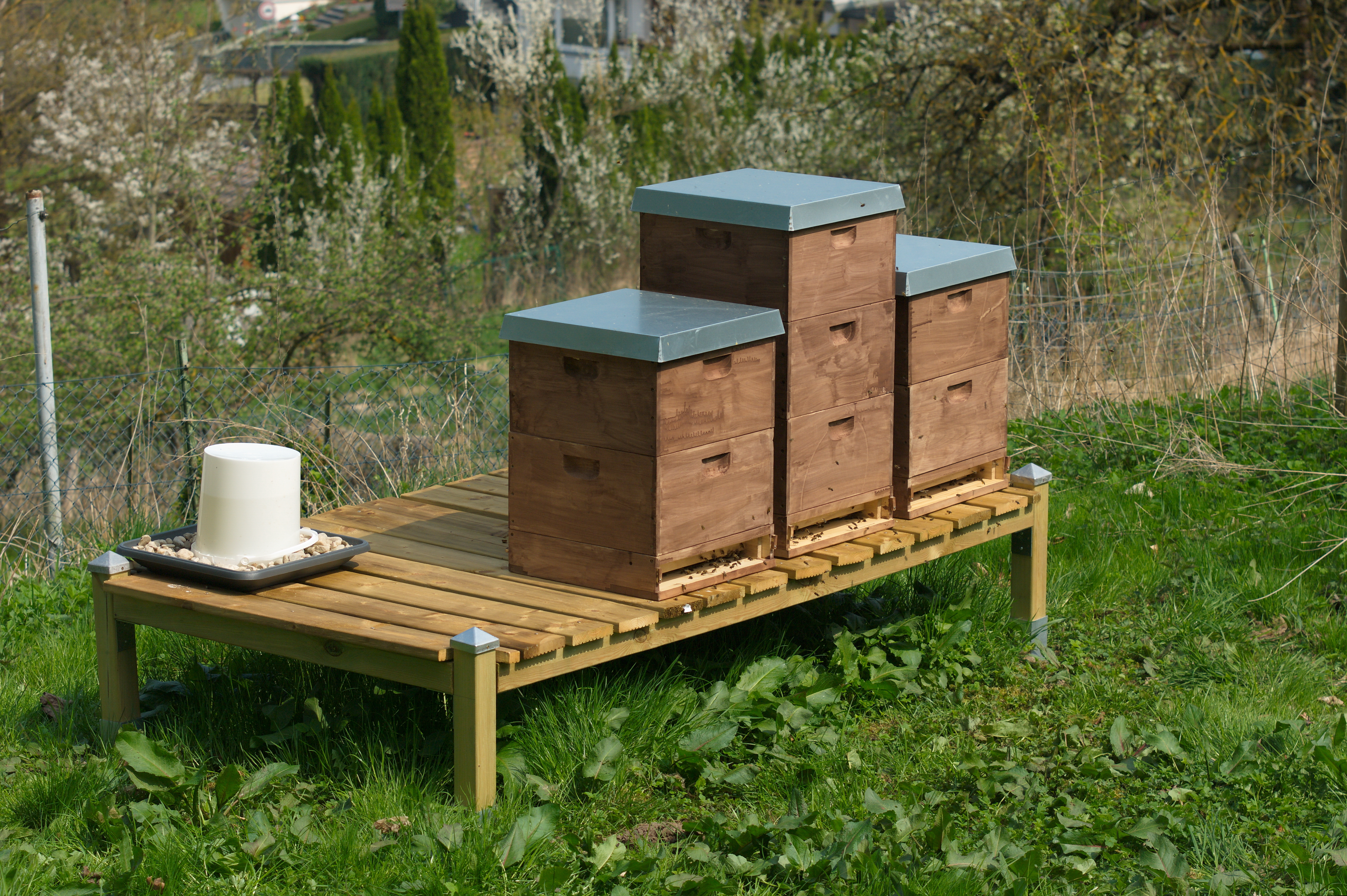
- Three Langstroth hives in tight assembly adjacent to an artificial water source
- Classification: Beekeeping
- Types: 8-frames and 10-frames hives
- Inventor: Lorenzo Lorraine Langstroth
- Manufacturer: various

In beekeeping, a Langstroth hive is any vertically modular beehive that has the key features of vertically hung frames, a bottom board with entrance for the bees, boxes containing frames for brood and honey (the lowest box for the queen to lay eggs, and boxes above where honey may be stored) and an inner cover and top cap to provide weather protection. In a Langstroth hive, the bees build honeycomb into frames, which can be moved with ease. The frames are designed to prevent bees from attaching honeycombs where they would either connect adjacent frames, or connect frames to the walls of the hive. The movable frames allow the beekeeper to manage the bees in a way which was formerly impossible.

The key innovation responsible for the hive's design was the discovery of bee space, a gap size between 6.4 and 9.5 mm (1/4 and 3/8 in) in which bees would not build burr comb, nor fill the gap with propolis. Modern Langstroth hives have different dimensions from L. L. Langstroth's beehive that was originally patented in 1852 and manufactured until circa 1920, but retain the main features of allowing bee space, as well as easy access, which works well for the bees, but also makes management of the beehive easier for the beekeeper. The standard beehive used in many parts of the world for beekeeping is based on the Langstroth hive.

== History ==
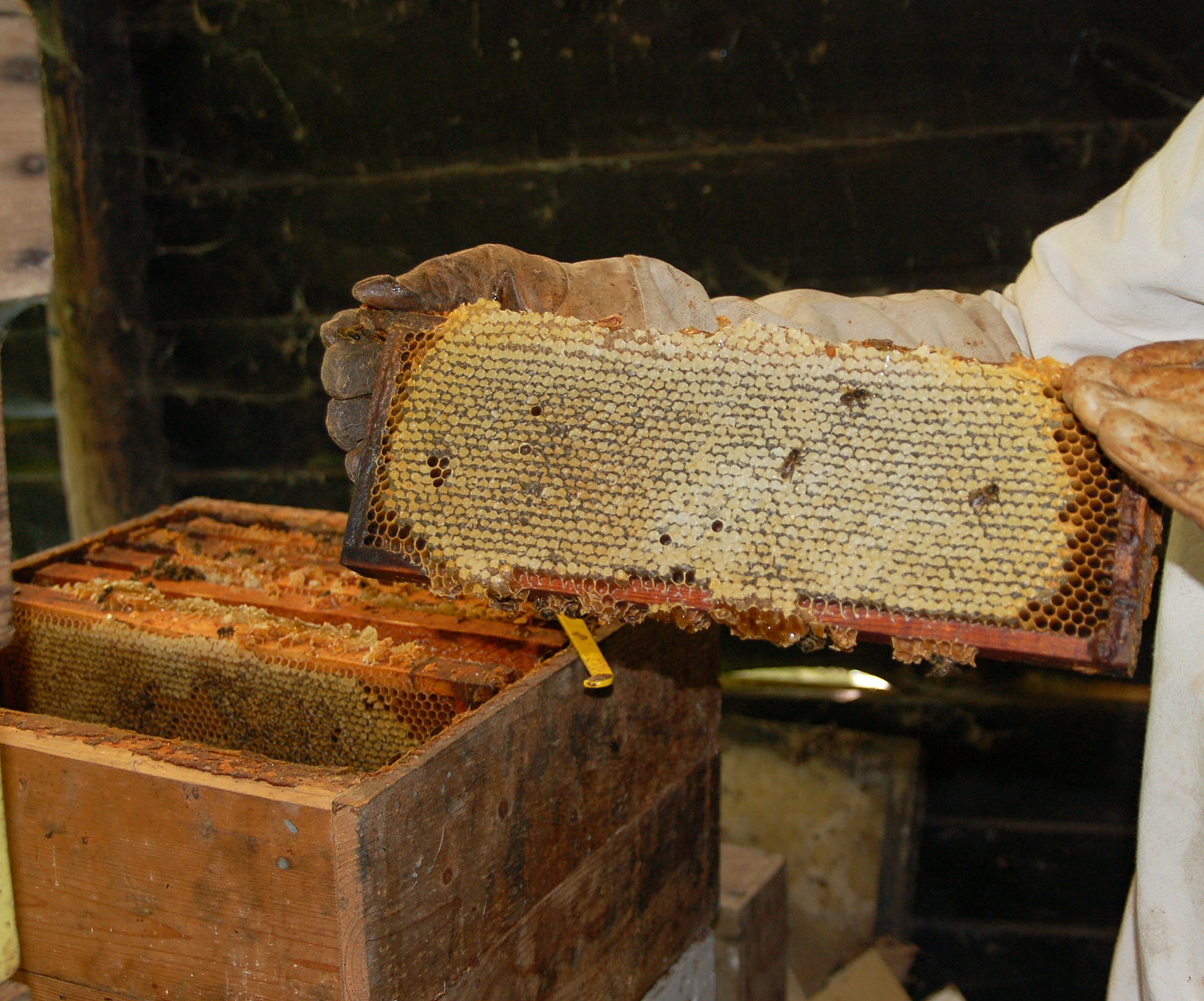
A frame taken out of a Langstroth hive seen on the left of the picture

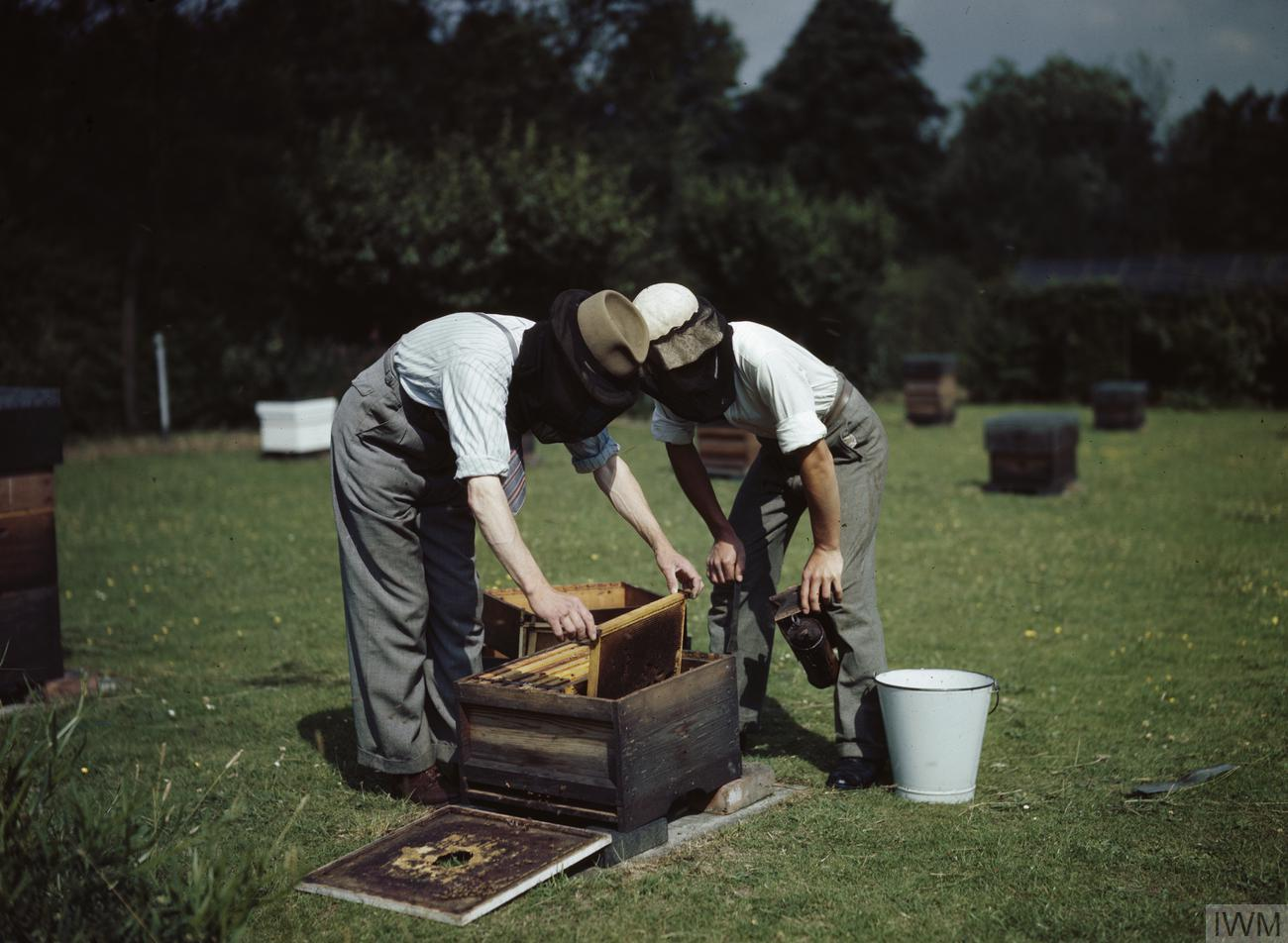
Two beekeepers in Britain inspecting a Langstroth hive during World War II. The hive's lid has been removed and is on the ground next to it.

Before the dimensions of bee space were discovered, bees were mostly hived in skeps (conical straw baskets) or gums (hollowed-out logs that approximated the natural dwellings of bees), or in box hives (a thin-walled wooden box with no internal structure). In 1814 the frame method was created by Ukrainian Petro Prokopovych. In 1851, the Reverend Lorenzo Lorraine Langstroth (1810–1895), a native of Philadelphia, noticed that when his bees had less than 9 mm (3/8 in) but greater than 6 mm (1/4 in) of space available in which to move around, they would neither build comb into that space nor cement it closed with propolis. This measurement is called bee space.

During the summer of 1851, Langstroth applied the concept to keeping the lid free on a top-bar hive, but in autumn of the same year, he realized that the bee space could be applied to a newly designed frame which would prevent the bees from attaching honeycomb to the inside of the hive box. Attaching comb to the hive wall was a difficulty with frameless designs, such as Dzierżon's frameless movable-comb hive (1835). US Patent 9300 was issued to Langstroth on October 5, 1852, and remained valid despite numerous attempts to challenge it based on its alleged use of prior art.

Langstroth made many other discoveries in beekeeping and contributed greatly to the industrialization of modern beekeeping. Other inventors, notably François Huber in 1789, had designed hives with frames (the so-called leafe or book hive), but Langstroth's hive was a practical, movable frame hive, which overcame the tendency of the bees to fill empty spaces with comb and to cement smaller spaces together with propolis. In contrast to August von Berlepsch's frame-movable, side-opened hive (May 1852, Germany), Langstroth's hive was top-opened, as was the Bevan top-bar hive (1848, UK). These combined adaptations led to the Langstroth hive design being preferred by beekeepers over all others, and variations on his hive are used throughout the world.

Langstroth subsequently published a book called A Practical Treatise on the Hive and Honey-Bee, nowadays commonly known as The Hive and the Honey Bee or, under the title with which it was re-issued in 2004, as Langstroth's Hive and the Honey-Bee: The Classic Beekeeper's Manual. In this book, Langstroth described the proper dimensions and use of the modern beehive as we know it today. Langstroth's book went through several editions until about 1900, but in all of them, the hive that is illustrated is the same as the original design.

== Bee space ==
A dimension of 7 ± 2 mm (9/32 ± 5/64 in or roughly 1/4–3/8 in) is the usual size meant when bee space is referred to. This setup has been established for the brood chamber, as for honey storage, the comb distance can be different.

Dr. Jan Dzierżon, a Polish apiarist, had determined the correct spacing for the top bars in beehives in 1835. The distance between combs had been described as 38 mm (1 1/2 in) from the center of one top bar to the center of the next one. In this case, the distance between combs is 14 mm (1/2 in); that is, twice the medium bee space of 7 mm (1/4 in). Later, in 1848, Dzierżon introduced grooves into his hives' side walls, to replace the strips of wood from which the top bars had earlier been hung. The grooves were 8 mm × 8 mm (5/16 in × 5/16 in).

In Europe, both Dzierżon and fellow apiarist Baron August von Berlepsch had been focused on side-opened hives. Land resources for beekeeping were limited, and traditionally, multiple beehives had been kept in a single beehouse. The so-called bee space had been incorporated by Berlepsch into his frame arrangement (Bienen-Zeitung, May 1852) following Dzierżon's discovery that grooves added to inner walls remained free of propolis (1848). Thus, the correct distance between frame side bar and hive wall was already understood by some European beekeepers before 1851.

Langstroth's patent of 5 October 1852 adopted 3/8 in (9.5 mm) as the upper limit of the bee space, slightly larger than optimal, between the side bars of a frame and hive wall, and also reserved rights to use the distance 1/2 in (13 mm) between top bars and inner cover, the latter of which represents a gap larger than optimal. The term "bee space" was coined later than Langstroth's 1852 patent.

Langstroth had been aware of Dzierżon's discoveries before he submitted his patent application. In the summer of 1851, he was introduced to Dzierżon's work by Samuel Wagner, who had visited Dzierżon in his apiaries in Silesia and subscribed to Bienen-Zeitung, the journal in which Dzierżon published his apiarian works, and who had translated Theorie und Praxis, ... from the German language original (though the translation was never published). Langstroth expressed great respect for Jan Dzierżon, saying, "No words can express the absorbing interest with which I devoured this work. I recognized at once its author as the Great Master of modern apiculture".

== Design ==
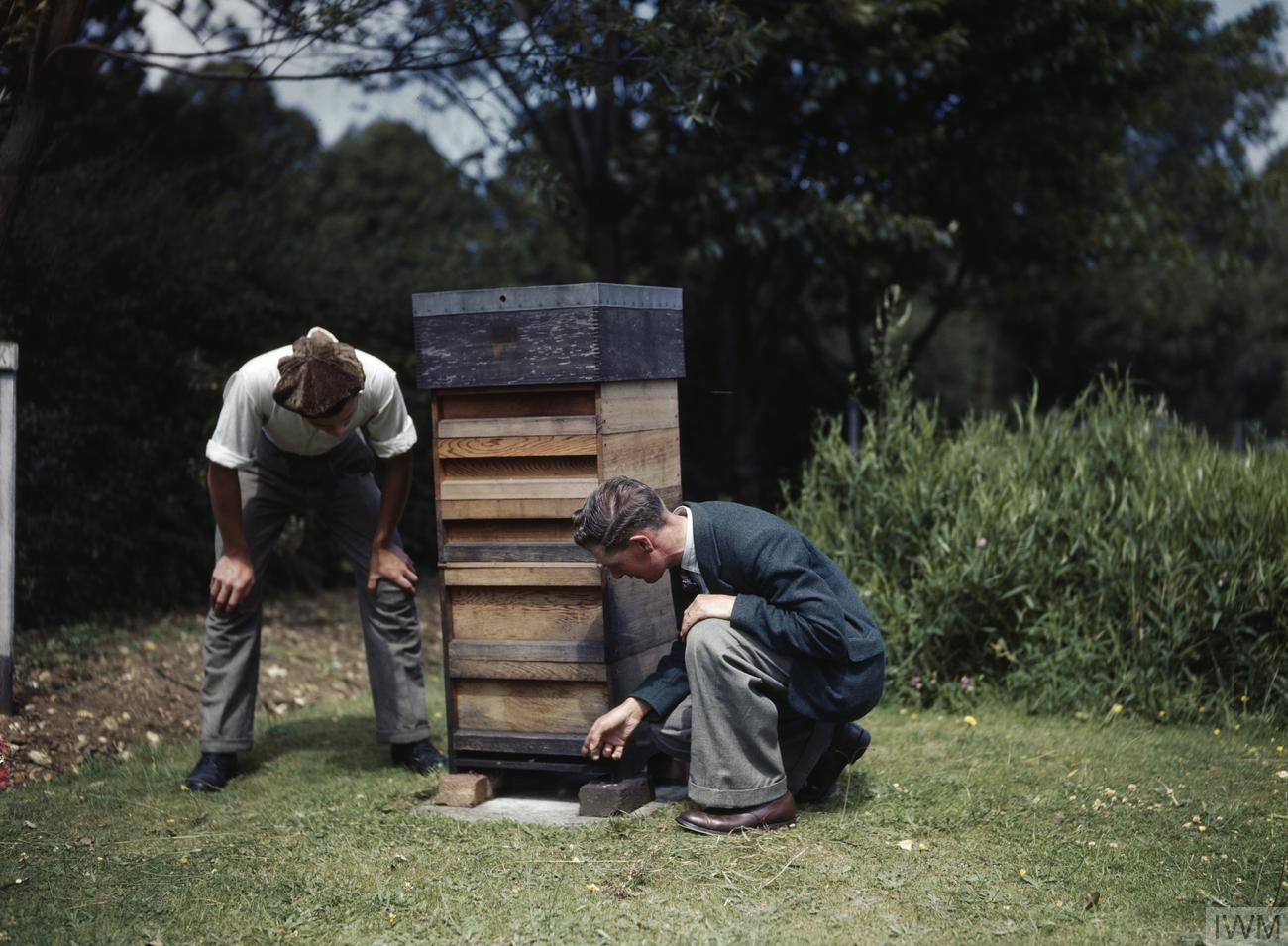
Two beekeepers with a beehive containing two brood chambers and three honey chambers

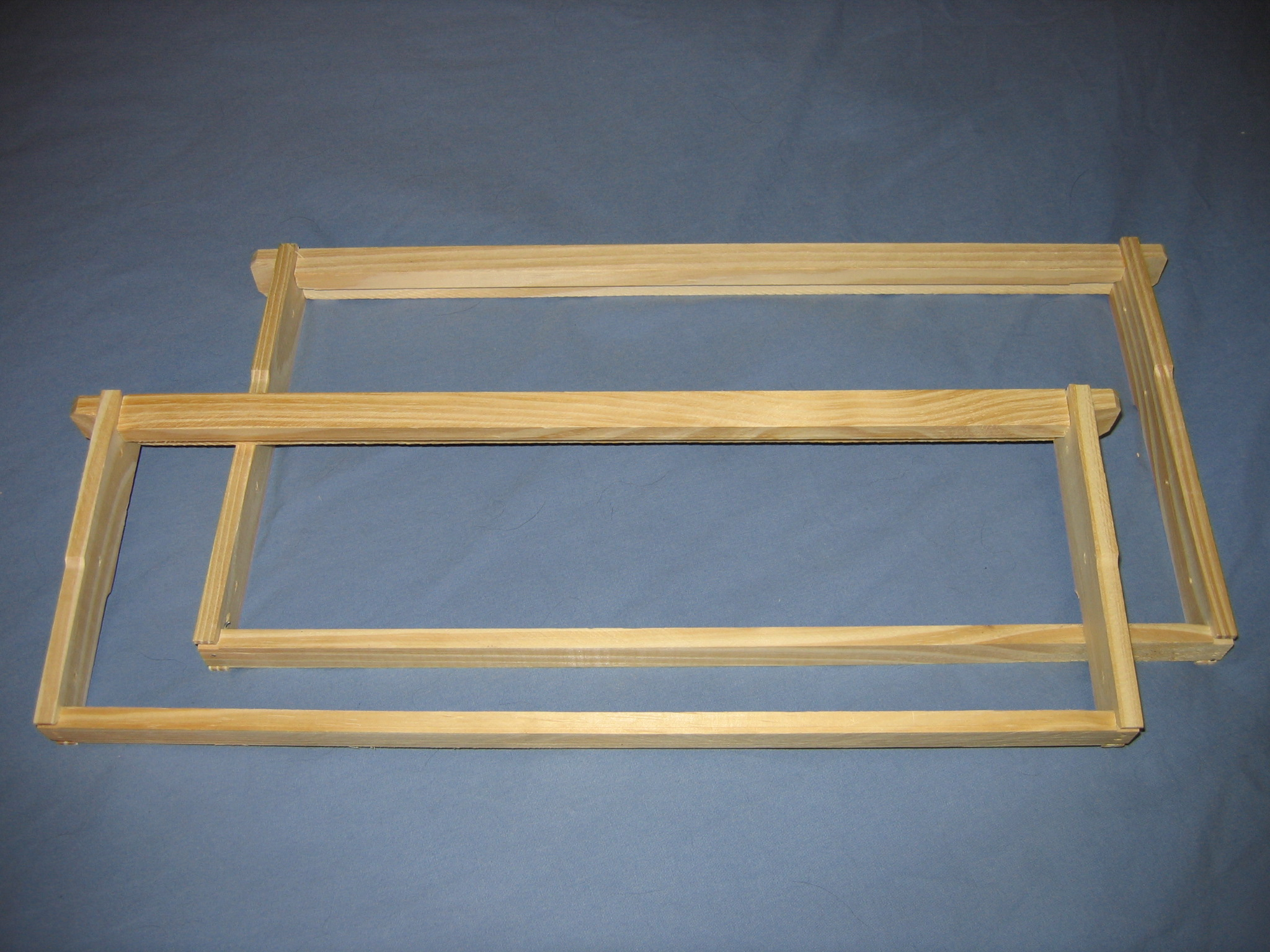
Langstroth hive frames

A modern Langstroth hive looks very different from Rev L.L. Langstroth's bee hive that was originally patented in 1852 and manufactured until approximately 1920. The original Langstroth hive had a portico entrance, integrated floor, and nonremovable brood box, a single removable honey box (using the same frame size as the brood box) that sat inside an outer box that extended from the brood box, and a hinged roof.

In a Langstroth hive, the frames, in which the bees were to make their combs, can easily be separated from all adjacent parts of the hive—the walls of the hive, the floor of the hive, the cover of the hive, and other frames within the hive. To extract a frame from such a hive does not require any comb to be cut. Usually, the most trouble a beekeeper encounters in removing a frame from such a hive results from the bees using propolis to bond frames to the brackets upon which they rest. Being able to remove and replace combs so easily makes it possible, and practical, for beekeepers to inspect all of their hives on a regular basis. Such inspections, to check for signs of disease and/or parasites, imminent swarming, an aging queen, and other conditions requiring intervention, are essential to successful bee husbandry.

The modern Langstroth bee hive is made up from top to bottom of:

- outer cover (telescoping or migratory)
- inner cover
- one or more smaller hive bodies (honey supers)
- one or more larger hive bodies (brood boxes)
- bottom board

Optional extensions that may form part of a Langstroth bee hive include:

- queen excluder between brood box and honey supers
- entrance reducer on the bottom board
- varroa inspection tray above, underneath or integrated into the bottom board
- spacers to allow for placement of supplied food

Each hive body contains eight to ten frames, made of wood or plastic, optionally with foundation made of wax and wires or plastic. Food delivery mechanisms such as pollen trays or syrup dispensers, as well as pest control dispensers, may also be placed inside the hive. The entire hive may be fastened together using a strap or by placing a heavy object on top of the hive.

=== Outer cover ===
The outer cover is a metal, wooden or polystyrene cover that fits on the top of the hive. In higher latitudes, a cover that telescopes down around the inner cover and an inch or so down over the top super, called a telescoping cover, is usually used. Many commercial beekeepers use what is known as a migratory cover, a solid cover that does not extend beyond the sides of a hive body.

=== Inner cover ===
The inner cover provides a barrier between the telescoping cover and the bees. In more temperate climates, a plastic foil may be used as an inner cover. Plastic foil should not be used to winter bees under, as trapped condensation could cause the hive to become wet, and bees can be lost due to freezing when temperatures fall during the night. In areas with a hot summer, a solid inner cover with a communication hole provides dead-air space for insulation against both heat and cold. This prevents the bees from gluing the top cover to the top bars of the super under it. When an inner cover is used, the top cover is more easily removed from the hive. Notches in the frame of the solid inner cover and telescoping cover can serve as an upper entrance for the bees. A communication hole in the middle allows bees to reach emergency food placed above by the beekeeper if it becomes required.

=== Hive body and hive super ===
Hive bodies and hive supers are rectangular boxes with standardized inside dimensions to take standardized frames, but regional and brand differences exist. Outside box dimensions vary depending on the type of material used; for example, polystyrene foam boxes have much larger outside dimensions than boxes made out of wood.

Three heights of boxes are standard—deep, medium, and shallow. Deep and medium hive bodies are used for the brood chamber. Medium and shallow supers are used for honey stores. The frames holding combs have top bars that hang on rabbeted slots or rails along the upper sides of a box.

The deep hive body is normally used only for brood. If it becomes filled with honey, it becomes too heavy to handle manually. Shallow supers are not ideal for the brood chamber of the hive because the bees need to form a single compact sphere during the cold winter months—a sphere that can expand and contract without being divided by a horizontal plane in the middle caused by the gaps between combs in multiple hive bodies. Commercial operations usually use one or two deep hive bodies for brood, and additional shallow boxes for honey supers. Some hobbyists prefer to standardise on two "medium" boxes. Also, a continental deep hive body called "jumbo" allows for Dadant-sized big brood frames.

| Name | Type | Depth | Frame length | Frame depth | Frame width |
|---|---|---|---|---|---|
| Jumbo, Dadant (Continental) | body | 294 millimetres (11.6 in) | 19 inches (480 mm) | 285 millimetres (11.2 in) | 1 3/8 inches (35 mm) |
| Deep | body | 9 9/16 inches (243 mm) | 19 inches (480 mm) | 9 1/8 inches (230 mm) | 1 3/8 inches (35 mm) |
| Medium (Illinois, Western) | body or super | 6 5/8 inches (170 mm) | 19 inches (480 mm) | 6 1/4 inches (160 mm) | 1 3/8 inches (35 mm) |
| Shallow | super | 5 3/4 inches (150 mm) | 19 inches (480 mm) | 5 3/8 inches (140 mm) | 1 3/8 inches (35 mm) |
| Comb | super | 4 3/4 inches (120 mm) | 19 inches (480 mm) | 4 1/8 inches (100 mm) | 1 3/8 inches (35 mm) |

The hive body or hive super holds 8 to 10 frames that are standardized in length. The frames hold the foundation and the honeycomb that is built on it.

Hive equipment manufacturers often produce bodies and supers that vary slightly. The differences between manufacturers are generally 1/8 of an inch (3 mm) or less. The following table includes interior dimensions and volumes for the 5-, 8-, and 10-frame shallow, medium, and deep bodies/supers.

| Type | Depth | Interior length | Interior width | Volume (cubic Inches) | Volume (liters) |
|---|---|---|---|---|---|
| 10-frame deep body | 9 5/8 inches (240 mm) | 18 3/8 inches (470 mm) | 14 3/4 inches (370 mm) | 2608.68 | 42.75 |
| 10-frame medium body/super | 6 5/8 inches (170 mm) | 18 3/8 inches (470 mm) | 14 3/4 inches (370 mm) | 1795.58 | 29.42 |
| 10-frame shallow super | 5 11/16 inches (144 mm) | 18 3/8 inches (470 mm) | 14 3/4 inches (370 mm) | 1541.49 | 25.26 |
| 8-frame deep body | 9 5/8 inches (240 mm) | 18 3/8 inches (470 mm) | 12 1/4 inches (310 mm) | 2166.53 | 35.50 |
| 8-frame medium body/super | 6 5/8 inches (170 mm) | 18 3/8 inches (470 mm) | 12 1/4 inches (310 mm) | 1491.25 | 24.44 |
| 8-frame shallow super | 5 11/16 inches (144 mm) | 18 3/8 inches (470 mm) | 12 1/4 inches (310 mm) | 1280.22 | 20.98 |
| 5-frame deep body | 9 5/8 inches (240 mm) | 18 3/8 inches (470 mm) | 7 3/4 inches (200 mm) | 1370.66 | 22.46 |
| 5-frame medium body/super | 6 5/8 inches (170 mm) | 18 3/8 inches (470 mm) | 7 3/4 inches (200 mm) | 943.44 | 15.46 |
| 5-frame shallow super | 5 11/16 inches (144 mm) | 18 3/8 inches (470 mm) | 7 3/4 inches (200 mm) | 809.94 | 13.27 |

=== Frames ===
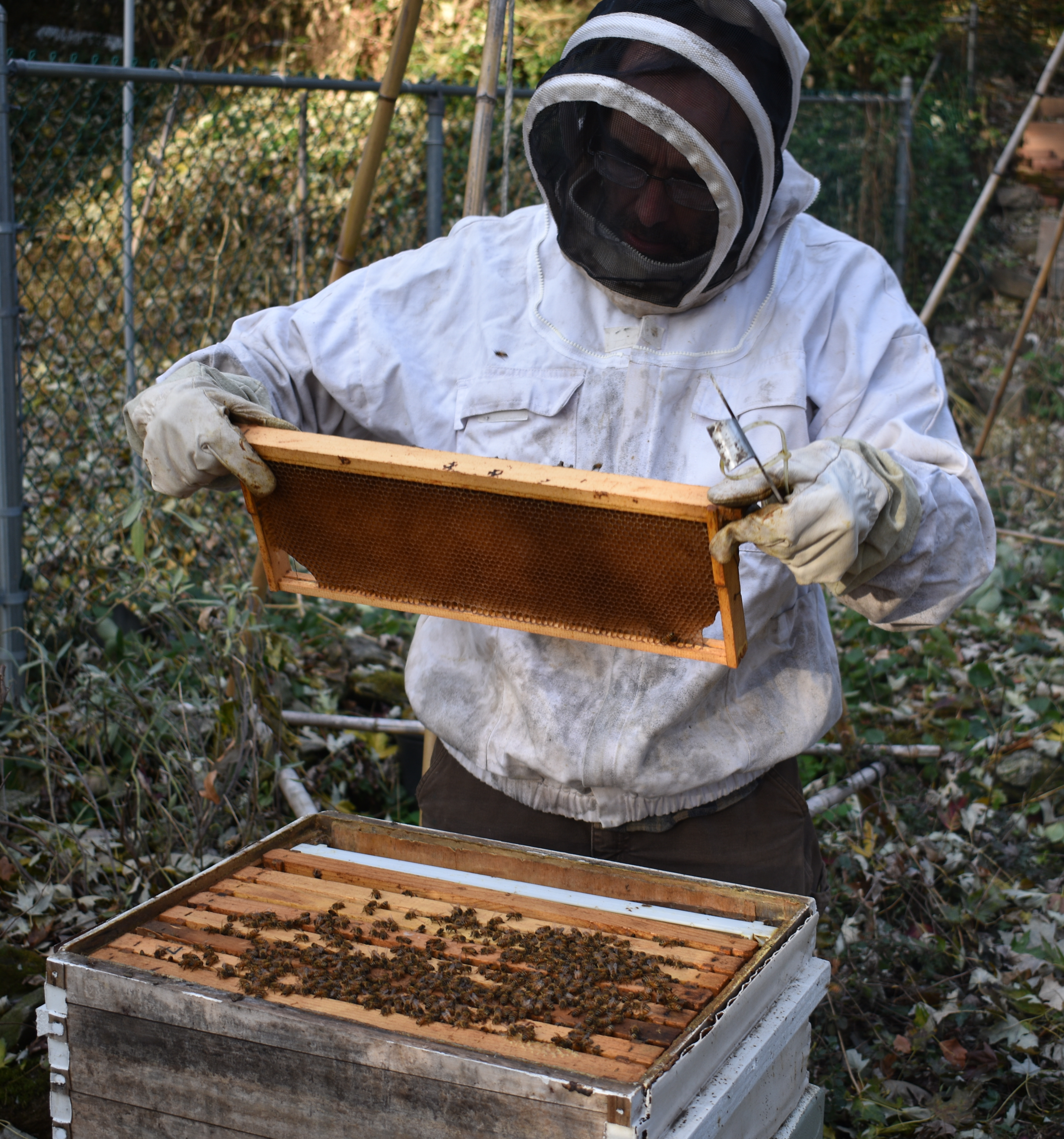
A beekeeper inspecting a frame

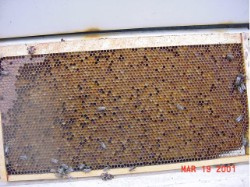
Langstroth frame of honeycomb with honey in the upper left and pollen in most of the rest of the cells

Movable frames hold bee combs, the furniture of a hive. They enable a great deal of hive management; inspection and harvest become both easier and less destructive of bees and beekeepers. In winter, bees sometimes can become so cold they are unable to move to the other side of a hive, so beekeepers often prepare hives for winter by moving all the honey together. Movable standard frames also permit transfer of combs of honey, pollen, or brood from a healthy hive to a failing hive. This practice is a mode of transfer of pests and diseases more effectively, that has haunted modern beekeeping since its introduction. Brood transfer even lets workers replace a dead queen by feeding royal jelly to the new brood.

Langstroth frames are usually oriented "the cold way", by permitting a draft from the entrance to move through the brood chamber, but this provides more direct paths from the entrance to the combs. In his book, Langstroth said that he chose this orientation by observing bees' preferences when building comb in box hives.

Modern beekeepers buy three sizes of standardized Langstroth frames to fit the three depths of standardized Langstroth supers. Frames are inexpensively mass-produced. Most beekeepers find making frames themselves to be uneconomical. The woodwork is too intricate and repetitive without specialized tooling.

Since the frame might touch both honey and bees, frames are usually made from inexpensive, nontoxic softwoods such as eastern pine. Plastic frames are also available.

When new frames are installed, they are filled with "foundation", artificial comb made of recycled natural beeswax or plastic. Beeswax foundation usually requires support from metal wires threaded through a frame. Foundation is widely used because bees make wax from carbohydrates that would otherwise be used to make honey. Some references say that as much as 7 lb (3.2 kg) of honey are sacrificed for 1 lb (0.45 kg) of wax.

The use of recycled beeswax concerns beekeepers because it can transmit diseases, such as American foulbrood. Some beekeepers, such as Christy Hemenway, have said that they believe that insecticides can be concentrated in the recycled wax, harming bees' health.

The frames in the Langstroth patent were not designed to use foundation. The top bars of the patent Langstroth frames were "comb guides", 60° triangular prisms of wood pointing downwards. These encourage the bees to construct new comb along the edge of the prism, within the frames. Some beekeepers today practice foundationless beekeeping.

=== Bottom board and entrance reducer ===
The bottom board is almost always exterior-grade plywood, to resist water damage. It keeps dampness and some pests out of the lower brood chamber. It rests on wooden rails, which in turn rest on the ground. Some beekeepers place the rails on bricks or sand to reduce water and termite damage. Langstroth's patent shows a wooden hive stool that lifts the hive several feet from the ground to a convenient working height for a beekeeper. A white plastic sheet is sometimes coated with a slightly sticky substance, and slid over the bottom board to trap and count fallen varroa mites, a bee parasite that can infest hives.

The entrance reducer is a square bar of wood to help the bees manage air circulation. Bees naturally manage their hive's temperature with fanning, clustering, and shivering. The reducer helps bees stay warm in winter, and fan less energetically in summer. It may drop into notches in the wooden rails or the bottom board. It has two different sizes of bee entrance notches cut into it, on different sides of the bar. In winter, the reducer is turned so that the smallest notch forms the entrance. This reduces the air flow and helps the bees to keep the hive warm. In spring and fall, it is turned so that the larger notch forms the entrance. In hot weather or full nectar season, the entire reducer can be removed to help cool the hive and permit more traffic to the fields.

In winter when the bees are too slow-moving to defend the hive, the entrance reducer may be supplemented with a mouse barrier to keep mice out of the hive.

Modern hives usually extend the bottom board slightly beyond the entrance to form a landing area, so that in nectar season, larger numbers of bees can land and walk into the hive. Langstroth's patent supplemented this with a cloth landing area supported on two wooden arms.

In Langstroth's patent, although the hive as a whole was level, the bottom board was slightly tilted toward the entrance so that liquid water would run out of the hive. The tilt also helped the bees to push dirt, debris, and dead bees out of the hive entrance. Modern commercial hives usually have level bottom boards.

Langstroth's patent entrance included two traps designed to attract wax moths away from the bee entry. These were loosely mounted so that a beekeeper could remove and destroy wax moth larvae and pupae.

=== Specialty parts ===
The Cloake board, also known as the "bottom-without-a-bottom", is a specialty piece of hive equipment that is installed between two hive bodies of the brood nest. It allows the beekeeper to insert a sliding metal or wood panel, which will split the hive into two parts, without having to lift the hive boxes, the objective being to split a single hive into two independent hives.

The queen excluder is a mesh grid, usually made of wire or plastic, sized such that worker bees can pass through, but queens (generally) cannot. When used, it is generally placed between the hive body and the honey supers. The purpose of the queen excluder is to keep the queen from laying eggs in the honey supers, which can lead to darker honey and can also complicate extraction. Many beekeepers reject the use of queen excluders, however, claiming that they create a barrier for workers and result in lower levels of honey collection and storage.

A feeder is most often used to feed granulated sugar or sugar syrup at times of the year when natural nectar sources are not enough for the hive's needs. Various styles are used. Division board feeders have a shape similar to that of the frame, and hang inside the hive body in the same manner as a frame. Entrance feeders are wedged into the hive entrance on the bottom board with an inverted container of feed. Hive-top feeders have the same footprint as the hive body and are placed on top of the hive, but underneath the telescoping cover. Other hive-top feeders consist of an inverted container with small holes in the lid, which are placed either directly on top of the frames, or on top of the hole in the inner cover.

When harvesting honey or maintaining the supers, an "escape board" or (British) "clearing board" is placed between the brood boxes and the supers to get most of the bees out of the supers. The escape board lets bees exit the supers into other areas of the hive, but makes it difficult for the bees to re-enter the supers. They are made in many different designs.

== Patents ==
- USPatent|9300—L.L. Langstroth's patent for a Bee hive from October 5, 1852
- USPatent|9300—L.L. Langstroth's patent for a Bee hive Reissued from May 26, 1863

== See also ==
- Amos Root
- BS National Beehive
