= Edward Weed =

Edward Weed may refer to:

- Edward P. Weed (1834–1880), Connecticut politician
- Edward Thurlow Weed (1797–1882), New York newspaper publisher and politician
- Edward Weed (fl. 1821–1822), co-founder of Weedsport, New York
- Edward Weed (fl. 1895), inventor of wax foundation rollers
