= Apis mellifera adansonii =

Scientific classification
- Kingdom: Animalia
- Phylum: Arthropoda
- Clade: Pancrustacea
- Class: Insecta
- Order: Hymenoptera
- Family: Apidae
- Genus: Apis
- Species: A. mellifera
- Subspecies: A. m. adansonii

Trinomial name
- Apis mellifera adansonii Latreille, 1804

Subspecies of honey bee

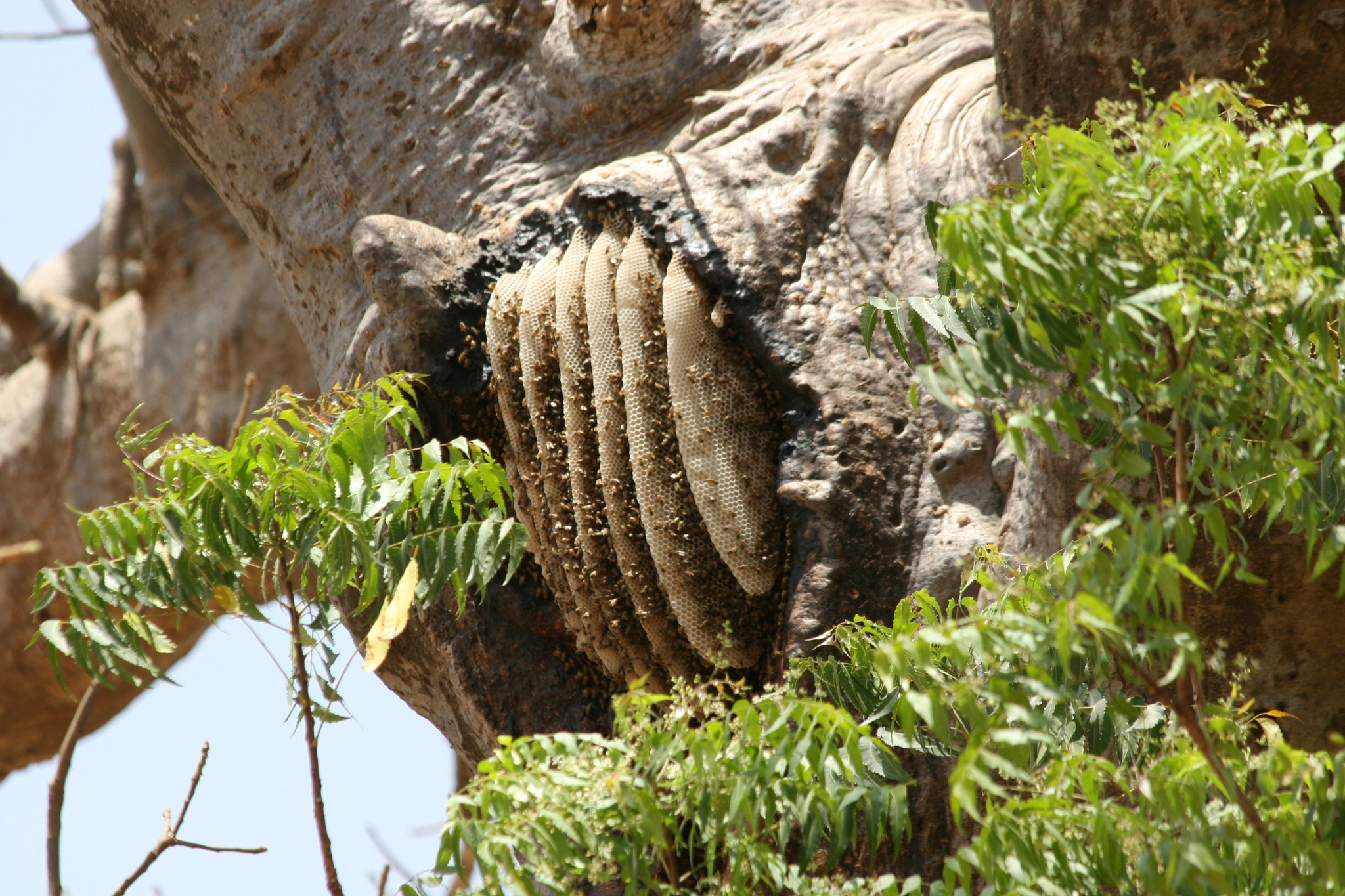

Apis mellifera adansonii (Western African bee) is a subspecies of the Western honey bee with probably the largest range of Apis mellifera in Africa, belonging to the A (Africa) Lineage of honey bees. Originally identified by Michael Adansonin in his Histoire naturelle du Seneegal in 1757. Initially the name adsansonii was misapplied to A. m. scutelleta and in particular to the Africanised bees of South America.

== Habitat ==
The native habitat of A. m. adansonii includes the tropical western regions of Africa from Senegal towards the southern border of Chad, extending southwards as far as the Congo, covering both tropical and semi-arid climates.

== Appearance ==
It is a small, yellow bee, with distinctive color even occurring in the drones. Larger than the A. m. litorea bee but otherwise similar in appearance, although genetically it is more closely related to the A. m. scutellata bee.

== Behavior ==
There are reports that if the A. m. adansonii is kept in traditional hives, where a single comb of honey would be removed from the rear. They can be kept near villages, even in house walls, only exhibiting aggression the day after honey is removed. However if they are subjected to greater manipulation such as with modern hives with moveable frames their aggression results in them only being able to be worked with during the night with heavy smoke.

Research conducted in Nigeria from 2010 to 2013 concluded that the A. m. adansonii were "varroa tolerant" due to the low levels of varroa destructor mites within the colonies being kept in traditional "Tanzania top bar hive(s)"; in just over 25% of the colonies no varroa mites were able to be detected. The authors theorized that the "larger degree of infertility of adult female mite after invasion of worker brood (in comparison to Western European Honey Bees)" could explain the low infestation levels. The paper concluded by describing the varroa mite as "of little significance" towards A. m. adansonii.
