= Cloake =

Cloake is a surname. Notable people with the surname include:

- Felicity Cloake, British food writer
- John Cloake (1924–2014), British historian and author
- Daniel Cloake, Sussex police drugs expert

== See also ==
- Cloake board, equipment used in beekeeping
- Cloke
