= Charles Dadant =

French-American beekeeper (1817–1902)

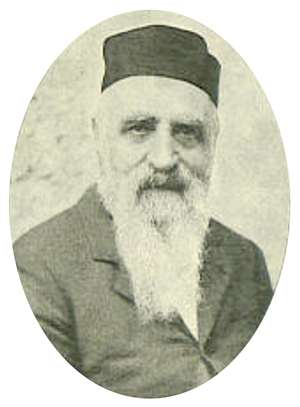
- Charles Dadant
- Born: 20 May 1817; Vaux-sous-Aubigny, Haute-Marne
- Died: 26 July 1902 (aged 85); Hamilton, Illinois
- Other names: French; American
- Occupation: Beekeeper
- Known for: Founder of modern beekeeping

Charles Dadant (20 May 1817 – 26 July 1902) was a French-American beekeeper. Along with L. L. Langstroth, Dadant is considered one of the founding fathers of modern beekeeping.

== Biography ==
Dadant was born in Vaux-sous-Aubigny, in Haute-Marne, in the Champagne-Ardenne region of France.

In 1863, at age 46, he moved to America, with dreams of starting a vineyard. Dadant purchased land on the rolling tallgrass prairie in Hamilton, western Illinois, where he built a simple log house.

After paying for his family to come to America from France and buying a farm, he was penniless. He did not know much English, but he was determined to succeed in his new country. When his dreams of being a vintner were not fulfilled, he turned to beekeeping, a hobby he had learned in France.

Dadant learned English by subscribing to the New York Tribune. While working as a traveling salesman in France, he educated himself. As his horse would plod along, Dadant would read the works of French biologist Jean-Baptiste Lamarck and the theories of the socialist Charles Fourier.

He renounced the Catholic Church and became a socialist. When he moved to America, he modeled his beekeeping business on socialist principles by working alongside his employees.

By the end of the American Civil War, he had nine colonies of honeybees, and traveled with his young son across the Mississippi River to sell honey and beeswax in a neighboring town. His interest in making quality candles grew from his love and knowledge of beekeeping.

Charles Dadant died in Hamilton in 1902.

He had one son, Camille Pierre Dadant (1851-1938).

In 1978, the Center for Icarian Studies (Western Illinois University) received from the Dadant family a collection of papers consisting of biographical information, Life and Writings of Charles Dadant by C.P. Dadant and The Life of C.P. Dadant, by M.G. Dadant.

== American Bee Journal ==
The American Bee Journal was established 1860 by Samuel Wagner and its first issue appeared in January 1861. Lorenzo Lorraine Langstroth was an early contributor and advisor. Charles Dadant contributed articles on beekeeping to numerous bee journals, both American and European. In 1867, his first article appeared in the American Bee Journal. He defended the Langstroth patented beehive in the journal. Charles Dadant translated Langstroth's Langstroth on the Hive and the Honey-Bee. A Bee Keeper's Manual. (1853) into French, so the rest of the world would learn of Langstroth's contributions to beekeeping. In 1885, Charles Dadant and his son, C.P. Dadant, were assigned the new edition of Lorenzo Langstroth's 1853 work Langstroth on the Hive and the Honey-Bee. A Bee Keeper's Manual. In April 1912, Charles Dadant's son Camille Pierre Dadant (C.P. Dadant) acquired The American Bee Journal from George W. York and Dadant & Sons have published it since.

== International beekeeping ==
Charles Dadant is one of the pioneers of modern beekeeping. He strived to import Italian bees into the United States, and according to ABC in Bee Culture 1890, he succeeded by shipping 250 queen bees to the United States in 1874. He was not the first to bring Italian queens into the United States, selling for up to half the price ($12) asked by his competitors.

Charles Dadant was always seeking a better way to keep bees. Having initially worked with the European beekeeping technique of skeps without frames, Dadant's attention was drawn by a magazine article to Moses Quinby and his work Mysteries of Bee-Keeping Explained (1853) and later to Lorenzo L. Langstroth's work A Practical Treatise on the Hive and the Honey-Bee (1859). He recognized the superiority of the magazine hive with movable frames. He tried Quinby's and Langstroth's frame sizes and also developed his own frame size of 12" x 13" (30.5 × 33 cm), which he also recommended in a French-language pamphlet, Petit Cours D'Apiculture, in 1874. He quickly abandoned that kind of beekeeping for the modern Langstroth hive concept. Bee hives have often been designed and built without regard for the needs and habits of the honey bee colony. Probably the best design for a colony was the large hive developed by Charles Dadant. It provided a large, deep brood chamber with plenty of room in which the queen could lay, and shallower supers for honey storage. However, the price and promotion of smaller Langstroth hives made of thin wooden boards offered for sale during the period from about 1885 to 1900 eventually made them more popular. Dadant founded one of the first beekeeping equipment factories in Hamilton, Illinois, which is still owned by the Dadant family today.

His writings on the large Dadant hive design appeared both in America and Europe and were responsible for the introduction of modern beekeeping methods in Europe. Here, the modified large Dadant-Blatt hive, named after Swiss beekeeper Johann Blatt, became the standard in many countries. The modified 10-blade Dadant hive, named after him, has been disseminated worldwide by his descendants since 1874. It is compatible with the Langstroth hive and became famous in Europe by honorable buckfast bee breeder Karl Kehrle (Brother Adam) in Devon, England.

For international beekeeping, it is important that the magazine hive system used in professional international beekeeping as Dadant-Blatt is standardized by AFNOR according to "NF U82-101:1950-03-01" and maintains bee space at all points, which ensures intercompatibility and reduces production and operating costs.

== See also ==
- Beehive
- Apiology
