= L. L. Langstroth =

American apiarist (1810–1895)

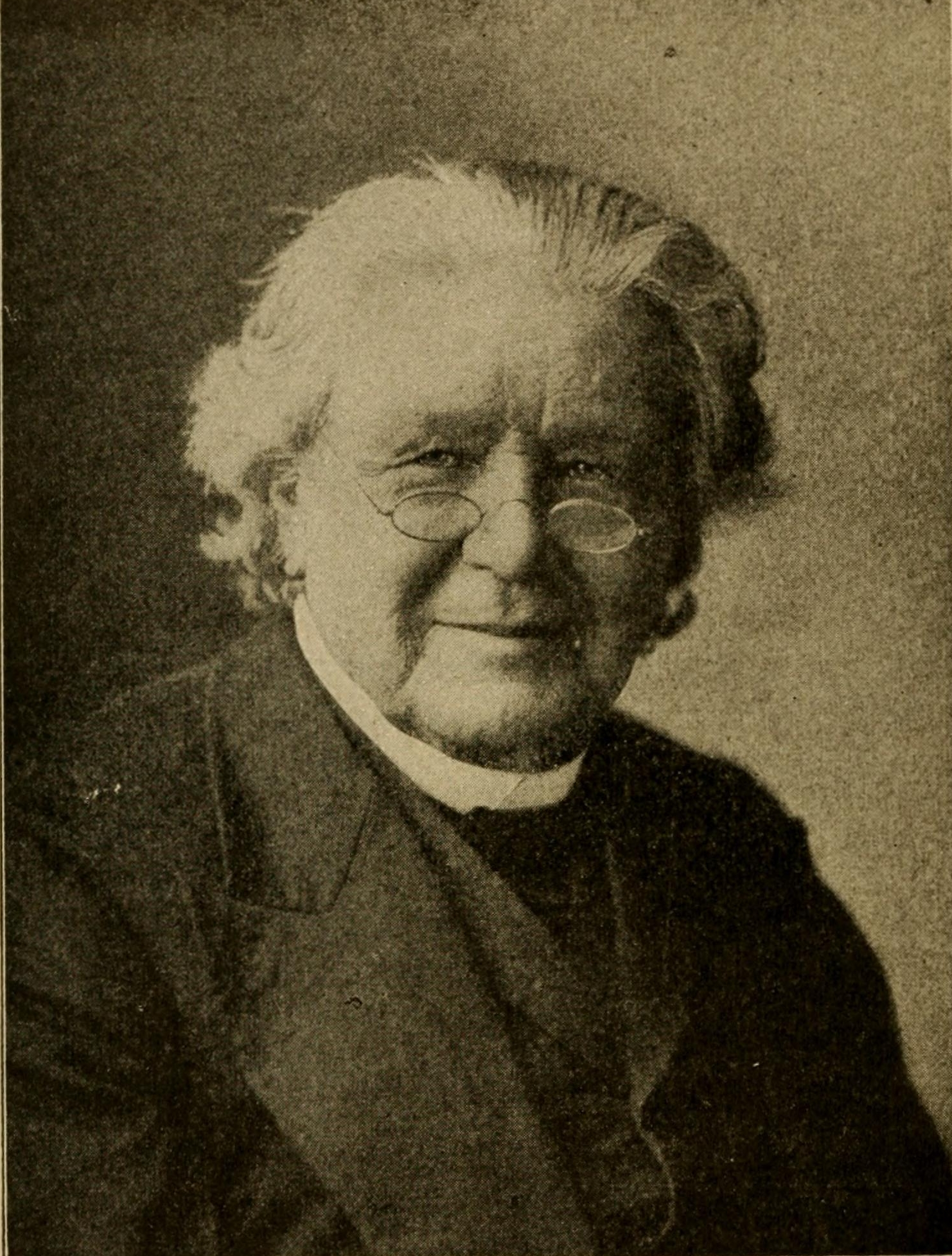
- Langstroth in 1890
- Born: Lorenzo Lorraine Langstroth; December 25, 1810; Philadelphia, Pennsylvania, U.S.
- Died: October 6, 1895 (aged 84); Dayton, Ohio, U.S.
- Education: Yale University (1831)
- Occupations: 5th Pastor of the South Church, Andover, Massachusetts; Beekeeper
- Notable work: Inventor of the Langstroth hive Father of American beekeeping
- Spouse: Anne Tucker (1812–1873)
- Children: James Langstroth (1837); Anna Langstroth (1840); Harriet A. Langstroth (1847)

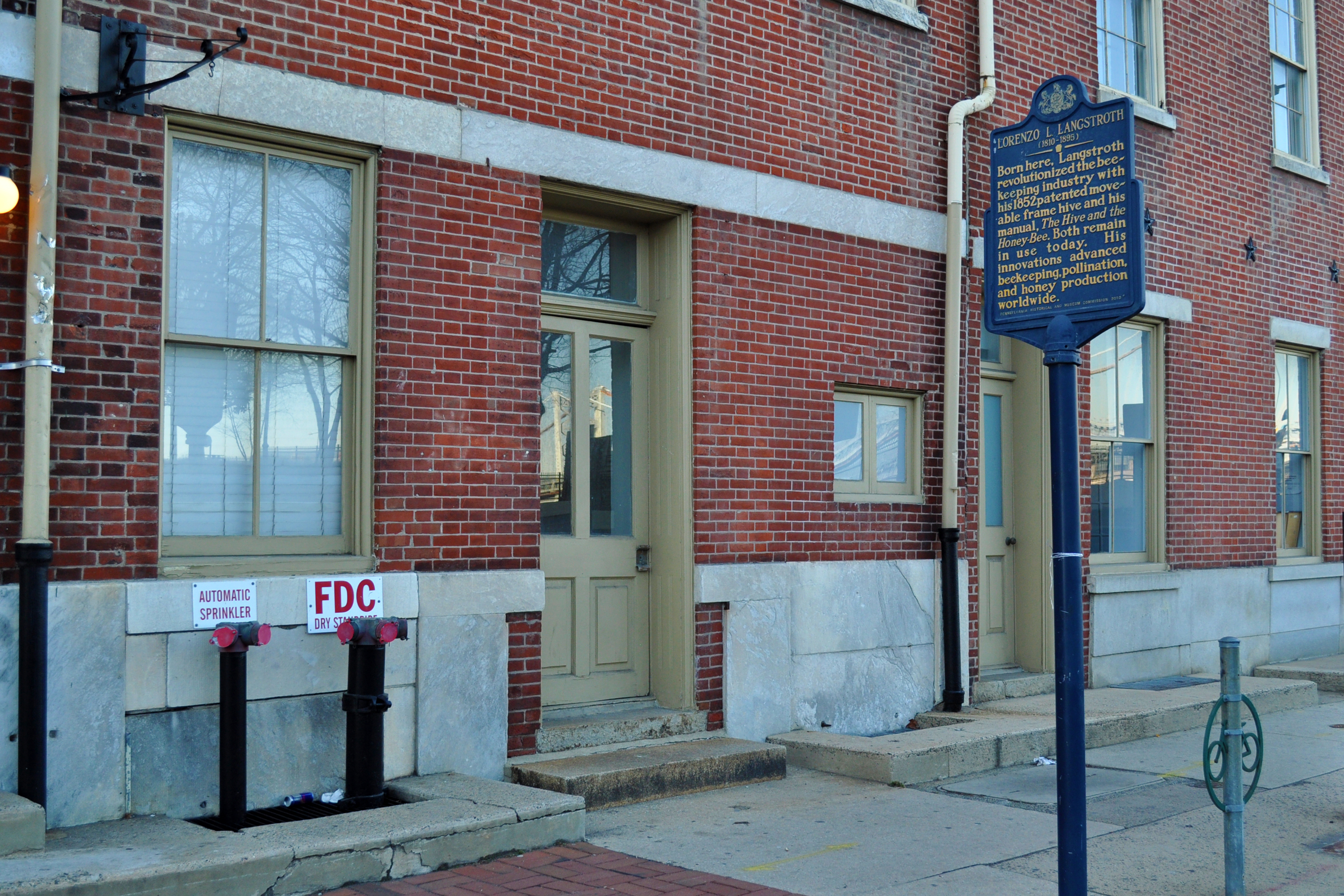
Lorenzo L. Langstroth historical marker at 106 S. Front St., Philadelphia PA

Lorenzo Lorraine Langstroth (December 25, 1810 – October 6, 1895) was an American apiarist, clergyman, and teacher, who has been called the father of American beekeeping. He recognized the concept of bee-space, a minimum distance that bees avoid sealing up. Although not his own discovery, the use of this principle allowed for the use of frames that the bees leave separate and this allowed the use of rectangular frames within the design of what is now called the Langstroth hive.

== Early life and family ==
Langstroth was born in Philadelphia, Pennsylvania on December 25 1810, the second of eight children in a family of English descent. Even as a boy he showed keen interest in insects. He graduated in theology from Yale Divinity School in 1831, and subsequently held a tutorship there from 1834 to 1835. After this, he was pastor of various Congregational churches in Massachusetts, including the South Church in Andover, Massachusetts in May 1836. In 1838 he visited a friend who kept bees and became interested in beekeeping. From 1843 to 1848, he served as pastor of the Second Congregational Church in Greenfield, Massachusetts. A large granite marker was placed on the church's front lawn by national beekeeper E. F. Phillips and others in 1948. In 1848, Langstroth became the principal of a young ladies' school in Greenfield, Massachusetts.

== Contributions to beekeeping ==
The Leaf Hive, invented in Switzerland in 1789 by François Huber, was a fully movable frame hive, but had solid frames that were touching and made up the "box." The combs in this hive were examined like pages in a book. Langstroth read the works of Francois Huber and Edward Bevan and obtained a Huber leaf hive in 1838. Langstroth acknowledged Huber's contribution and noted: "The use of the Huber hive had satisfied me that, with proper precautions, the combs might be removed without enraging the bees, and that these insects were capable of being tamed to a surprising degree. Without knowledge of these facts, I should have regarded a hive permitting the removal of the combs as quite too dangerous for practical use." (Langstroth on the Honey-Bee, 1860)

=== Development of the bee space ===
Langstroth was popularly credited with discovering the "bee space", though this discovery had already been implemented in European hives. The discovery was that if a gap of 7 to 10 mm (1/4 to 3/8 in) was present, bees did not close it with wax. This allowed movable frames which could be kept free of each other. In Europe, both Jan Dzierżon and August von Berlepsch had been focused on side-opened hives. Land resources in Europe had been limited, and bees were traditionally kept in beehouses. The idea of "bee space" had been incorporated by Berlepsch following Dzierzon's discoveries, from the years 1835–1848, into his frame arrangement (Bienen-Zeitung, May 1852). Langstroth made many other discoveries in beekeeping, and contributed greatly to the industrialization of modern beekeeping.

Langstroth revolutionized the beekeeping industry by using bee space in his top-opening hive. In the summer of 1851, he found that by leaving an even, approximately bee-sized space between the top of the frames holding the honeycomb and the flat coverboard above, he was able to remove the coverboard quite easily, which was normally well-cemented to the frames with propolis, and made separation difficult. Langstroth later used this discovery to make the frames themselves easily removable. If a small space was left (less than 1/4 in or 6.4 mm), the bees filled it with propolis; conversely, when a larger space was left (more than 3/8 in or 9.5 mm), the bees filled it with comb.

=== Innovations to beehive design ===
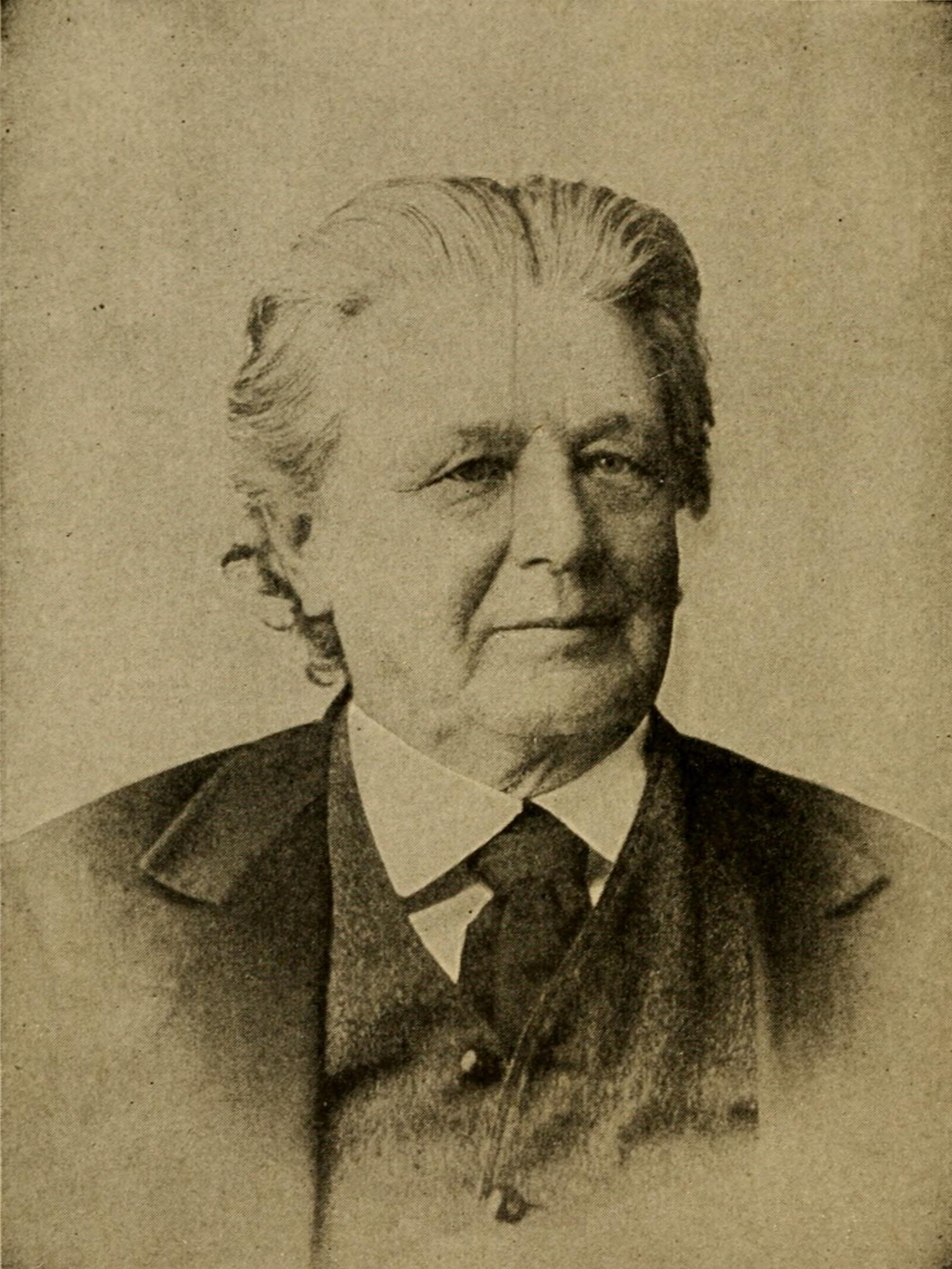
Langstroth at 70

In 1851 he created something called improved bar-hives where he used bars at the top of the hive to suspend combs. Petro Prokopovich had created movable-frame hives in 1806. Prokopovich's frames rested on the bottom. The idea was however unknown to Langstroth. Langstroth filed his patent in January 1852 and shortly after that he fell ill and he was forced to quit his schoolteaching and he returned to Greenfield. Here he wrote a Bee Keeper's Manual. A translation was made of Dzierzon's book by Samuel Wagner who visited Langstroth and persuaded Langstroth to write a book. Wagner began the American Bee Journal in 1861. On 5 October 1852, Langstroth received a patent on the first movable frame beehive in America. A Philadelphia cabinetmaker and fellow bee enthusiast, Henry Bourquin, made Langstroth's first hives for him. By 1852, Langstroth had more than a hundred of these hives, and began selling them where he could. Langstroth spent many years attempting to defend his patent without success. He never earned any royalties, because the patent was easily and widely infringed. Langstroth hives are still in common use today. He wrote that

... the chief peculiarity in my hive was the facility with which they could be removed without enraging the bees .... I could dispense with natural swarming, and yet multiply colonies with greater rapidity and certainty than by the common methods .... feeble colonies could be strengthened, and those which had lost their queen furnished with the means of obtaining another. .... If I suspected that anything was wrong with a hive, I could quickly ascertain its true condition and apply the proper remedies.

Langstroth also found that several communicating hive boxes can be stacked one above another, and that the queen can be confined to the lowest (or brood) chamber, by means of a queen excluder. In this way, the upper chambers can be reached only by the workers, and therefore contain only honey-comb. This made hive inspection and many other management practices possible, and turned the art of beekeeping into a full-scale industry. At the time of Langstroth's contributions, honey was the chief sweetener in American diets, so Langstroth's new beekeeping techniques were of great importance. His discoveries and inventions allowed beekeeping to be done more cost-effectively on a large scale. Since four to twelve pounds of honey—in addition to many hours of bee time—are consumed by bees in the production of one pound of beeswax, honey production was increased from reuse of the comb.

=== The Hive and the Honey-Bee ===
In 1853, Langstroth had moved back to Greenfield, Massachusetts from Philadelphia, and published The Hive and the Honey-Bee (Northampton (Massachusetts): Hopkins, Bridgman, 1853), which provided practical advice on bee management and, after more than 40 editions, is still in print today. Langstroth on the Honey Bee was published in 1860.

== Move to Oxford, Ohio ==
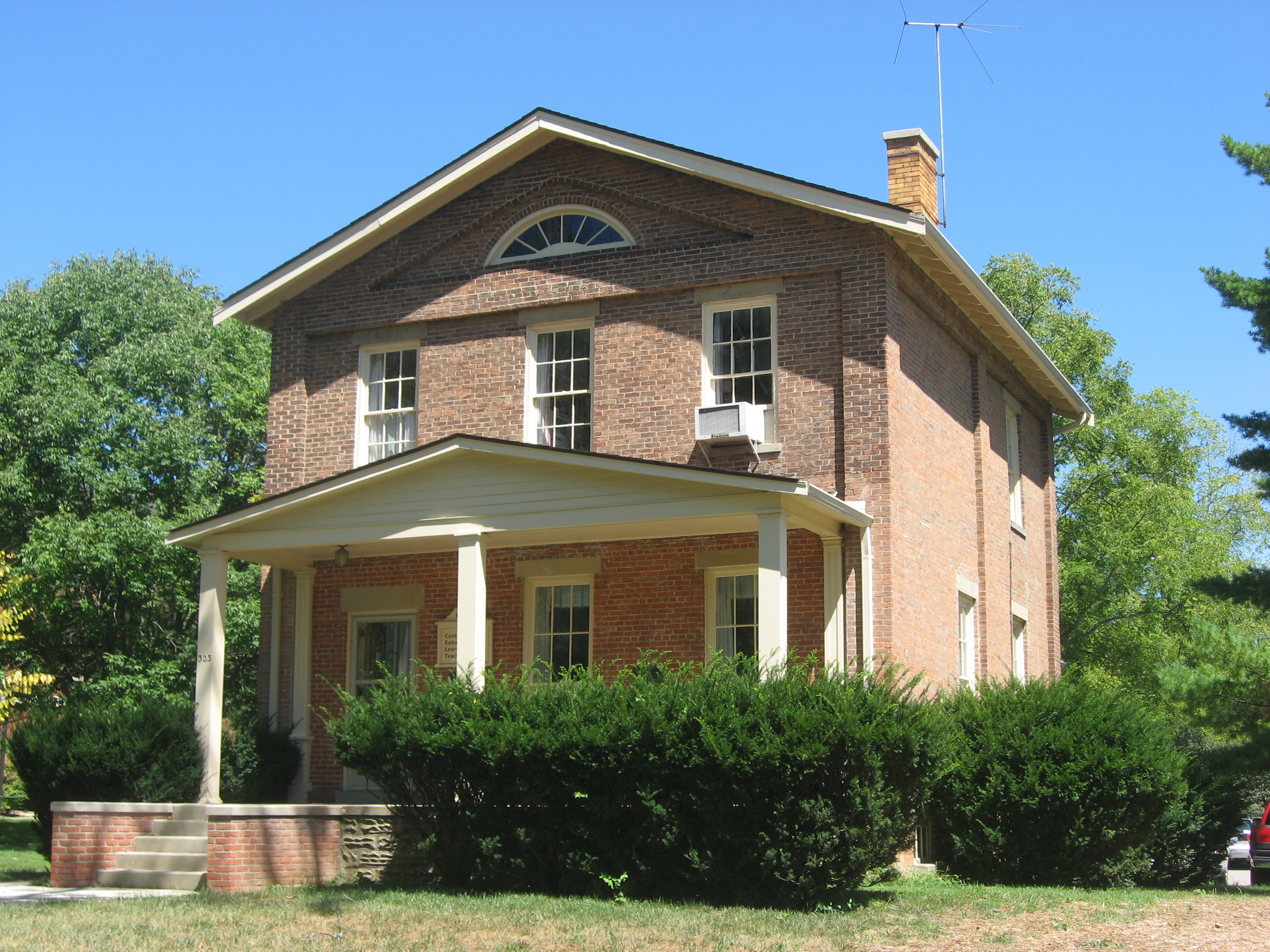
Langstroth Cottage in Oxford, Ohio

After 1858 Langstroth made Oxford, Ohio, his residence, and devoted his time to beekeeping. The site was 10 acres (40,000 m^{2}), and was an ideal place to keep bees. Langstroth planted a row of linden trees along the street, and apple trees throughout his property. He sowed buckwheat and clover seed, using 1-acre (4,000 m^{2}) of ground for a formal garden, filled with the flowers that bees like best, and called it his honey garden. The home where he lived from 1858 to 1887 was built in 1856, and is now called Langstroth Cottage; it is designated a National Historic Landmark. It was donated to the Western College for Women, and is today home to the Miami University Center for the Enhancement of Learning and Teaching.

Langstroth's book was taken over for revisions from 1885 by the bee-keepers Charles Dadant and son Camille Pierre who had settled from France in Hamilton, Illinois. They published in French and Italian and came to the defence of Langstroth when his patent was challenged as being based on older ideas.

Langstroth received his first Italian bees at his home in 1863; Italian bees were more productive than the European bees that were most common in America at the time. He and his son sold the Italian queens at $20USD each, and in one year, sold 100 of them, with many being sent by post all over the United States.

== Later life ==
In 1887, he moved with his daughter, Mrs. H. C. Cowan, and her family to Dayton, Ohio. Langstroth died at the pulpit of the Wayne Avenue Presbyterian Church in Dayton on October 6, 1895, just as he was beginning a sermon on the love of God. He is buried at Woodland Cemetery and Arboretum in Dayton. His epitaph reads as follows:

Inscribed to the memory of Rev. L.L Langstroth, "Father of American beekeeping", by his affectionate beneficiaries who, in the remembrance of the service rendered by his persistent and painstaking observations and experiments with the honey bee, his improvements in the hive, and the literary ability shown in the first scientific and popular book on the subject of beekeeping in the United States, gratefully erect this monument.

Langstroth's papers are located at the American Philosophical Society Library in Philadelphia.

== Patents ==
- US Patent 9300 — L.L. Langstroth's patent for a Bee hive from October 5, 1852.
- US Patent RE1484 — L.L. Langstroth's patent for a Bee hive Reissued from May 26, 1863.
- US Patent 61216 — L.L. Langstroth's joint patent (with S. Wagner) for an Improved Apparatus for Extracting Honey from the Comb from January 15, 1867.

== See also ==
- Clyde Cowan — his great-great-grandson, astrophysicist, and co-discoverer of the neutrino.
- Langstroth's Hive and the Honey-Bee, Dover Publications ISBN 0-486-43384-6 (original version, still in print)
- Ron Brown's Great Masters of Beekeeping, Bee Books New and Old ISBN 0-905652-31-2
- Smith, Ophia D. (1948). "Langstroth, the "Bee Man" of Oxford". Ohio Archaeological and Historical Quarterly. 57 (2): 147–164.
- Naile, Florence (1976). America's Master of Bee Culture: The Life of L. L. Langstroth. Cornell University Press. ISBN 978-0-8014-1053-6.
- Apiology
