= Cloke =

Cloke is a surname. Notable people with the surname Cloke include:

- Cameron Cloke, Australian rules football player
- David Cloke, Australian rules football player and father of Travis, Cameron and Jason Cloke
- Geoffrey Cloke, British chemist
- Hannah Cloke, English hydrologist
- Jason Cloke, Australian rules football player
- Kristen Cloke, American actress
- Travis Cloke, Australian rules football player

== See also ==
- Cloake
