= BS National Beehive =

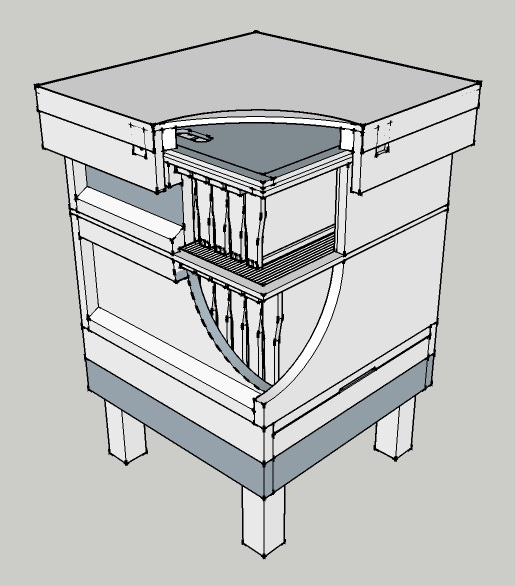
CGI rendering of BS National Beehive, cutaway to show the internal parts

The Improved National Beehive was a form of Langstroth beehive standardized by two British Standards (in 1946 and then in 1960, before being withdrawn in 1984). The same standard contained the specification of the Smith beehive: these two forms represent the most popular designs used in the UK.

== Design ==
The National hive, as it is usually known, is based on Langstroth hive design principles: a vertical stack of modular components. Its dimensions are generally smaller and notably the brood chamber is shallower than the typical Langstroth hive to suit a less prolific bee strain.

The original specification and the associated Ministry of Agriculture, Fisheries and Food leaflet detail a floor (now often superseded by an open-mesh floor which allows monitoring of Varroa infestation), stand, deeper standard brood boxes, shallower honey Super boxes, a section rack (for production of sections of comb honey), a crownboard and a roof. The main boxes are 18 1/8 in (460 mm) square in footprint: the standard brood boxes being 8 7/8 in (230 mm) tall, and the shallow super 5 7/8 in (150 mm) tall. The main walls are 3/4 in (19 mm) thick.

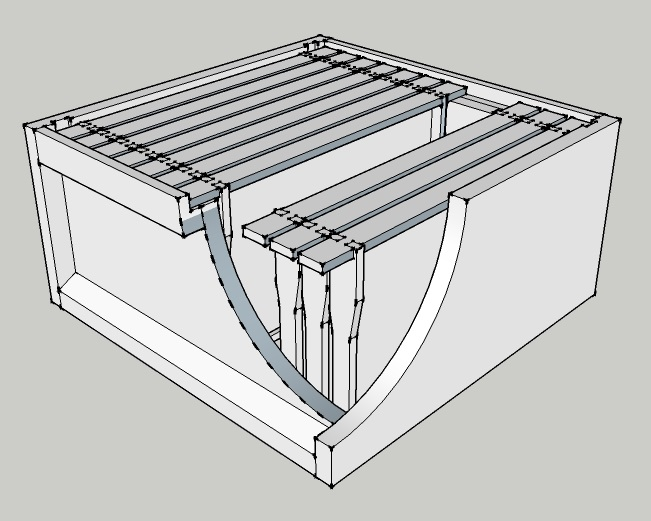
BS National standard (brood) box, with frames shown through cutaway (two frames removed, to show detail)

The internal frames are supported on runners on two sides of the box, in a deep rebate formed by the two-piece construction of the sides. Because the boxes are square, it is possible to orient frames in two ways with respect to the entrance, either parallel to the entrance block ("warm way") or perpendicular to it ("cold way").

The National beehive is specifically designed to house frames detailed in the standard. These are 14 in (360 mm) wide, with a height of either 8 1/2 or 5 1/2 in (220 or 140 mm). In brood boxes, up to twelve frames can be used, but (once propolised), twelve frames are typically too tight a fit for easy use, and eleven frames (with, perhaps, a dummy board filling the space) are more common; in honey supers, between nine and twelve can be used, depending on the spacing chosen. The National frames have a long top-bar to the frame (17 in or 430 mm) giving them long lugs of 1 1/2 in (38 mm) that rest on the runners.

In its original form, the National hive provides 3/8 in (9.5 mm) bottom beespace—that is, the top surface of the frame bar is flush with the top of the box, and the lower surface of the frame is one bee space above the bottom of the box. Thus, when two boxes are stacked atop one another, there is exactly one beespace vertically between the frames. However, both top and bottom beespace designs may now be found in use.

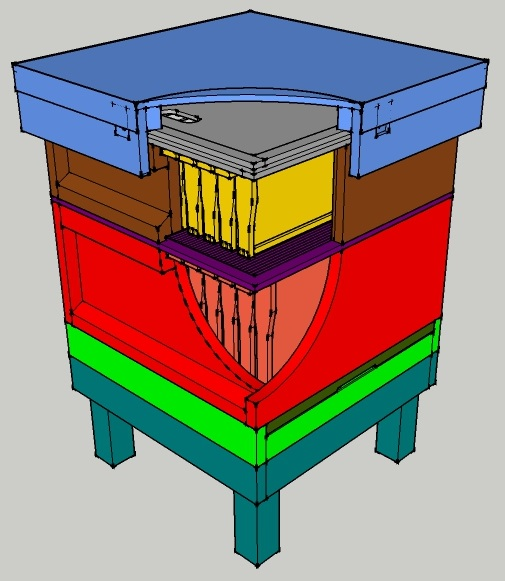
Blue: roof. Grey: crownboard Brown: shallow super; Gold: shallow frames. Purple: queen excluder. Red: standard broodbox; pink: standard frames. Lime: floor; green: entrance block. Teal: stand.

The roof shown in the MAFF leaflet is a telescoping cover, with internal dimensions of 18 3/4 in (480 mm), meaning a relatively loose fit over the topmost box. The total height of the roof is (depending on timber thickness) around 6 1/4 in (160 mm), though a 4 in (100 mm) roof is now also common. Supports set into the roof create a 1 1/4 in (32 mm) ventilation space above the crownboard rim (therefore 1 1/2 in (38 mm) above the crownboard surface, as it has a raised rim creating 1/4 in (6.4 mm) beespace on both sides): the total overlap of the telescoping cover is thus 4 1/2 in (110 mm). The roof must be covered with a waterproofing layer: typically this may be galvanized steel sheet.

Box	Length x width /mm	Height/mm	Volume/l	Frame capacity	Frame width/mm	Frame height/mm	Comb area/m^{2}	Cells
Deep (14x12, brood)	460 x 460 (external) 374 x 422 (internal)	315	50.0	12 (in total), 11 (in practice)	355	305	2.07	93,500
Standard (14x8.5, brood)	460 x 460 (external) 374 x 422 (internal)	225	35.7	12 (in total), 11 (in practice)	355	216	1.42	63,525
Shallow (14x5.5, honey super)	460 x 460 (external) 374 x 422 (internal)	150	23.8	10–12	355	140	0.77–0.93	34,700–41,800

== Features ==
The National hive has a number of features which—in addition to the inertia of popularity—recommend it.

- The standard brood box is considered well suited to non-prolific bees, providing just over 63,000 cells, and has sufficient space both for summer brood rearing, and winter storage.
- There are several methods to increase the size of the brood chamber, if this is required:
  - Use of a larger 14 in × 12 in (360 mm × 300 mm) box, where the height of the frame is 12 in (300 mm), instead of the standard 8 1/2 in (220 mm), and the box is thus either 12 3/8 in (310 mm) or 12 1/2 in (320 mm) tall. (This box is not part of the original British Standard, and is thus of variable height.)
  - A second standard brood box, thereby doubling the size.
  - Brood and a half chamber of a standard and a shallow box.
- The weight of a full honey super is still manageable by one person, especially as the boxes have secure handholds (created by the two-piece sides).
