= Cloake board =

Piece of equipment used in beekeeping

- Classification: Beekeeping
- Inventor: Harry Cloake

A Cloake board is a piece of equipment used in beekeeping to facilitate raising queen bees. Invented by New Zealander Harry Cloake, the Cloake board consists of a queen excluder mounted to a wooden frame. The wooden frame contains a slot which allows a "temporary" floor (solid divider) to be inserted.

== Cloake method of queen rearing ==
The Cloake method of queen rearing involves a series of stages which divide a colony into a queenright lower colony and a queenless upper colony to improve acceptance of grafted larvae, or to facilitate the creation of queen cells naturally.

=== Stage one ===
Cloake board insertion: The Cloake board is placed between two hive bodies when the queen is known to be in the lower hive body. Because a Cloake board either contains or is used with a queen excluder, the laying queen will be restricted to the lower hive body from this point forward. Frames containing larvae should be moved to the upper box to encourage nurse bees to come up, these will be needed to attend to the future queen cells. At this time the lower entrance to the hive is reversed so that it faces the opposite direction and then closed. Without the slide in floor in place, the Cloake Board functions as an upper entrance for workers, who re-orient to enter the hive using the upper entrance.

=== Stage two ===
Slide in the metal divider (insert): By sliding the divider into the Cloake board, the single functioning colony is now divided into two parts – a queenright lower colony and a queenless upper colony. The lower entrance is re-opened, allowing bees in the queenright section to exit the hive. When those bees return, they will do so to the upper entrance, but not be able to enter the lower colony. This results in a higher population of bees in the upper colony. The upper colony is typically left alone for 24 hours for a settling period, in which the bees determine that they are queenless, and prepare to replace their missing queen.

=== Stage three ===
Grafted cells Installed: The queenless upper colony is now prepared to raise queens, and by inserting queen rearing bars with grafted larvae, the beekeeper provides candidates for new queens. At this time any emergency queen cells will be removed by the beekeeper. Stage three continues for one to two days, long enough for the cells to be fully accepted and built up.

=== Stage four ===
Rejoin colonies as a "Finisher": The slide-in-divider is removed from the Cloake board. The queen excluder continues to retain the laying queen in the lower colony while the combined colony incubates the grafted queens. The queen cells will be removed before they hatch and transferred to mating nucs.

Following the removal of the ripe queen cells the cloake board can be removed to re-establish the single united colony.

=== Alternate method – no grafting ===
A cloake board can also be employed to create queen cells on existing frames without grafting. The steps are basically the same as above with the following modifications:

- Stage 2: Before sliding the solid divider in place, inspect the top brood box and determine there is at least one frame with new unhatched eggs. Multiple frames with new eggs will often result in multiple frames with queen cells.
- Stage 3: N/A.
- Stage 4: After finishing, you can either cut out the queen cells and place them in mating nucs, or place an entire frame with finished queen cells in a mating nuc.
