= Horizontal top-bar hive =

Type of beehive

Top-Bar Hive
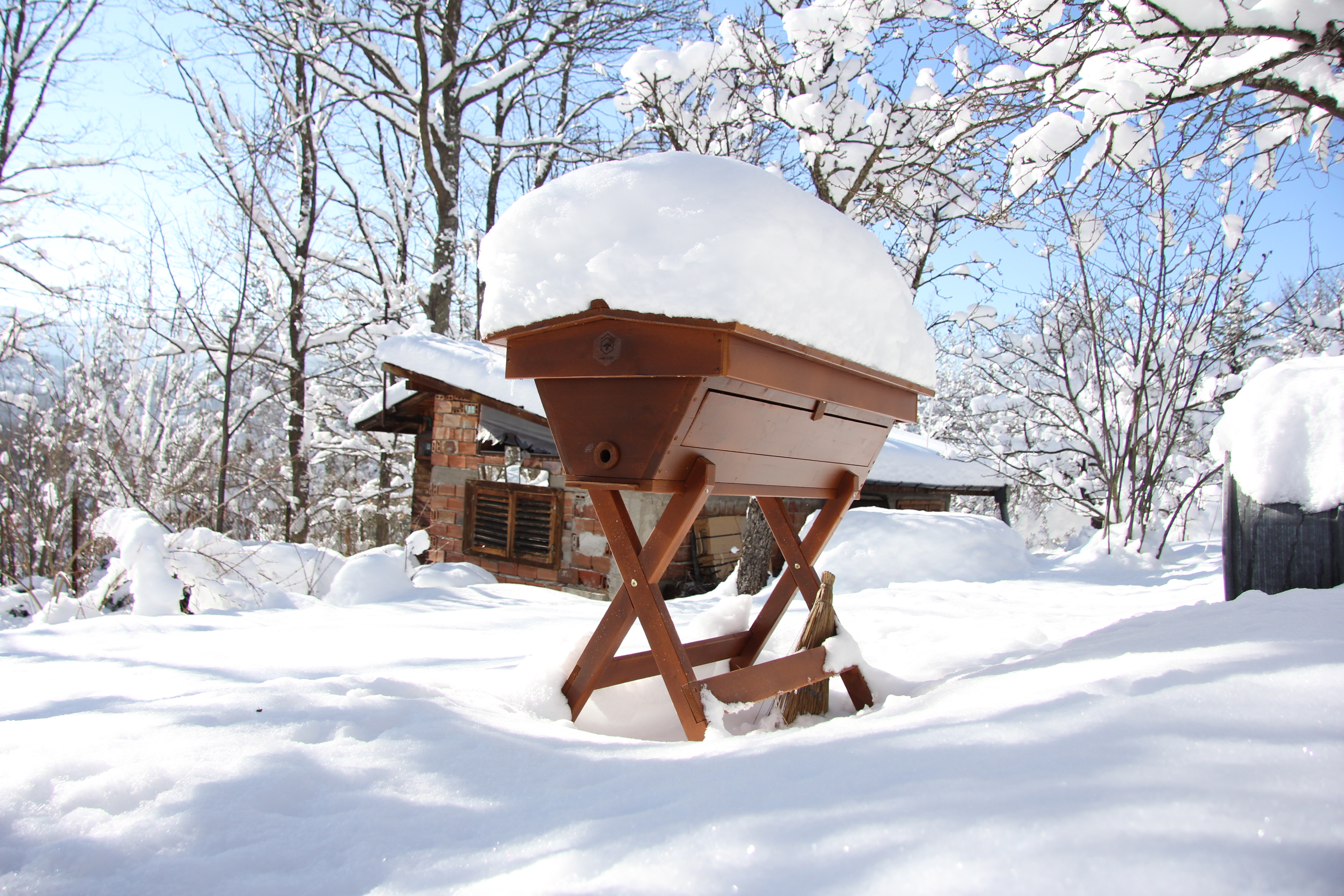
- Modern top bar hive
- Other names: Kenyan Hive
- Classification: Beekeeping
- Inventor: unknown

A top-bar hive is a single-story frameless beehive in which the comb hangs from removable bars. The bars form a continuous roof over the comb, whereas the frames in most current hives allow space for bees to move up or down between boxes. Hives that have frames or that use honey chambers in summer but which use management principles similar to those of regular top-bar hives are sometimes also referred to as top-bar hives. Top-bar hives are rectangular in shape and are typically more than twice as wide as multi-story framed hives commonly found in English-speaking countries. Top-bar hives usually include one box only, and allow for beekeeping methods that interfere very little with the colony. While conventional advice often recommends inspecting each colony each week during the warmer months, heavy work when full supers have to be lifted, some beekeepers fully inspect top-bar hives only once a year, and only one comb needs to be lifted at a time.

There is no single opinion leader or national standard for horizontal hives, and many different designs are used. Some will accept the various standard frame sizes.

== General information ==
Although the two most well-known styles of long top-bar hives are named "Kenyan" and "Tanzanian", the Kenyan hive was actually developed in Canada, and the so-called Tanzanian hive is not the same as the top-bar hive that was developed in Tanzania.

The design of top-bar hives has its origins in the work done in 1965 by Tredwell and Paterson. A tub shaped top-bar hive was trialled in Rhodesia in the 1960s by Penelope Papadopoulou. Long top-bar hives began to appear in the 1960s and were first referred to as "grecian" hives also known as the "Anástomo" wicker skep. Similar "long" top-bar hives were also developed in the early 1970s by other authors. The David Hive (1972) was similar to the Kenyan top-bar hive, except that the comb was not cut from the bars at harvest time but reused after extraction. Also in 1972, William Bielby designed a top-bar hive that featured catenary curved comb.

=== Design ===
Although guidebooks for use in Africa often give precise dimensions for the Kenyan hive, and encourage beekeepers to keep their equipment of uniform and thus interchangeable sizes, one of the main selling points of the KTBH among proponents from English speaking countries is the fact that it can be made to practically any size and shape, as long as the top bars have an appropriate width.

The angle of the sloped sides is most commonly recommended to be 30 degrees. The width of the top bars is the sum of comb thickness and one measure of beespace. This helps ensure that bees build exactly one comb per top bar. Most top-bar hive plans freely available on the internet show hives of roughly 1 meter (3') long and between 30 cm (12") and 50 cm (20") wide and high.

In English speaking countries, the top-bar hive is usually mounted on a set of legs that lift the hive to a height that is comfortable for beekeepers. In African countries, the height of the hive is often also determined by the type of animal the hive is meant to be protected from.

==== Top bars ====
A top-bar hive has bars from which the honey bees attach and hang wax comb, an array of hexagonal (six sided) cells.

A beekeeper can make top bars from any plain wood. The top bars are usually 1 1/4 to 1 3/8 in (32 to 35 mm) wide, depending on local conditions and the type of bee to be housed. Combs can be handled individually. The depth of the bar and the length of the bar can be whatever the beekeeper wants, but usually between 17 and 20 in (430 and 510 mm). If the top bar hive is deeper than 12 in (300 mm), the weight of the comb filled with honey tends to cause it to fall off the bar into the bottom of the hive. The bees will lose access to this during the winter cluster in the hanging combs, thus increasing their likelihood of starving.

It is important to give the bees a clear starting point to build comb on each top bar. Some TBH beekeepers fashion their top bars with a V-shaped bottom to guide the comb building. Alternatively, some use a table saw to cut two closely spaced slots along the long axis of each new top bar. Either type of guide, wax line or grooves, gives bees a place to hold on to with their hooked feet. This allows a substantial "drape" of bees to form, which is the beginning of comb building.

==== Entrance ====
Top hives have entrances that are a small slot or a number of holes of an inch in diameter or thereabouts, which more closely mimics what honey bees prefer in nest cavities.

The brood nest will be established nearest the entrance. If the entrance is at the narrow end of the hive, the honey storage will be deep in the hive beyond the brood nest combs. Typically inspections will then begin with either the beginning of the brood nest at the front, or with the end of the honey storage at the rear. If the entrance is placed in the center of the long wall, the brood nest will be at the center, and the honey storage will be on either side. As it is not possible to safely remove a bar from the middle of the occupied combs, due to possible side attachments, this means the inspection can begin on either side of the honey storage and there are fewer before the brood nest is reached.

The entrance should not be placed high on the hive as this will allow the escape of winter heat (but see) for an alternative perspective).

The bees will be able to keep a top bar hive cool enough with only three holes of 1 inch (25 mm) diameter. They do so by both lining up to fan cool air into the hive and exhaust warm air, and by evaporation – essentially air-conditioning the hive. It is possible to have too small of an entrance, such as a 4-inch (100 mm) slot of only 3/8 to 1/2 inch (9.5 to 12.7 mm), and this did result in combs falling from the bars in the heat. It also resulted in much traffic back up at the entrance.

It is suggested that bees in a Kenyan hive will have much less tendency to adhere comb to the sides of the hive. Once adhered comb is freed from the side (leaving a beespace) the bees tend to not rejoin the comb, so this is not a significant problem for either hive. It is important in either type that end access or some free space without comb is available so adhered comb may be freed.

=== Comparisons with hive systems using vertical "supers" and conventional frames ===
The initial costs and equipment requirements are typically much less than other hive designs. Scrap wood can often be used to build a good hive, and top bars are easy to make out of scrap timber. Horizontal hives do not require the beekeeper to lift super boxes; all usual checks and manipulation can be done while lifting only one comb at a time and with minimal bending. In areas where large land animals (such as ratels and bears) present a threat to beehives, single-box hives may be suspended out of reach. Elsewhere, they are commonly raised to a level that allows the beekeeper to inspect and manipulate them in comfort. Since no seasonal storage of honey collection boxes ("supers") is needed, nor is a centrifugal extractor commonly used, the equipment budget and storage space requirements are greatly reduced. Time and money may not need to be spent wiring foundation into frames.

A top bar hive can also be rapidly converted to two or even three mini hives, called a nucleus hive, by placing bee-tight dividers within the hive, and allowing access to independent entrances. This may avoid the need to purchase and store such nucleus hives.

Disadvantages include (usually) unsupported combs that cannot be spun in most honey extractors. It is not usually possible to expand the hive if additional honey storage space is required. Most horizontal hives cannot easily be lifted and carried by one person.

=== Hive management ===
It is recommended that new or recycled empty bars be placed at each side of the brood chamber just before spring build-up as it is easier for the bees to make new comb than to move honey stores to make room for new brood. This will also ensure the maintenance of a well built honey barrier between the brood and higher grade stores. To prevent the buildup of old comb in the brood chamber it may be advantageous to add new bars only on the entrance side of the brood chamber just past the pollen stores. This will cause a collection of older honey in re-used comb, which may be removed and used to produce a somewhat lesser quality of honey, as it will have additional flavors from the propolis used to strengthen and protect the brood comb. Such honey may be especially appropriate for making mead and root beer, as additional flavors will predominate. The progressive removal of brood comb appears, as noted above, consistent with control of American foulbrood (AFB). The use of follower boards to selectively control the amount of interior space available to the bees can be helpful, particularly in young hives or when dealing with newly captured swarms.

The recent introduction of sliding 'follower boards' to enclose the colony within the hive body has enabled more flexible management of top bar hives and facilitated quicker inspections with minimal disturbance to the bees. (Follower boards are adjustable solid panels, which effectively reduce the size of the interior space within the hive box that is accessible to the bees.)

==== Queen exclusion ====
Natural queen exclusion occurs more frequently in top-bar hives, because the brood nest is separated from the honey section by at least a full bar of honey comb, and not just a few centimetres (inches) of honey as may be the case in a multi-storey framed hive. And the more honey is gathered, the further the brood nest becomes from newly created comb.

However, some commercial top-bar beekeepers have found that artificial queen excluders are sometimes necessary to keep the queen from laying eggs in the honey section of the hive.

==== Hive inspection ====
A top-bar hive is inspected by lifting the bars of comb individually. Some beekeepers start their inspection at any one of the bars, and can be completed over several sessions. Others start at either the front of the hive, against the wall or divider, or at the rear of the combs. This way the beekeeper can see and cut any side attachments before moving the first comb. Side attachments can be cut with a conventional hive tool; using a specially-made tool long enough to reach the bottom of the hive, but with a narrow "leg" at the bottom, is more efficient. More than one bar can be separated from the side walls at a time. The use of smoke is commonly recommended.

Inspection of the combs can be carried out with far less disturbance to the bees than is the case with multi-storey hives, since only a small amount of the hive is exposed at any one time. Some hives incorporate a viewing glass window in the side of the hive that allows for observation without opening the hive itself, since in theory the combs do not get attached to the sloping sides.

The top-bars rest freely on the hive walls without spacers, which means that the top-bars can be slid easily along the length of the hive during the inspection, without altering the sequence of the combs, and non-inspected bars need not be lifted out of the way to gain access to other bars.

As part of the "natural beekeeping" concept, some beekeepers recommend opening the brood area only once a year.

=== Harvesting honey ===
The most popular method of harvesting honey from a top-bar hive is by cutting the comb from the top-bar, crushing the comb and straining the honey. This results in honey with a higher pollen content than honey that is extracted by flinging out without crushing the comb. Top-bar hive comb can be extracted by flinging motion e.g. in a hobbyist or commercial rotary extractor, but it can be problematic, because (a) if no foundation was used, the comb will break more easily during rotary movement, (b) top-bar hives combs may use irregular or non-standard sizes that do not fit into commercially available extractors, (c) if the comb is not uniformly flat, it may be difficult to uncap the cells, which is required for rotary extraction and (d) not all rotary extractors have cages or mesh to prevent loose pieces of comb from falling into the drum.

Honey can also be harvested from top-bar comb as cut comb.

As crushing and straining is the most common method for honey harvesting in this type of hive, beeswax is often a by-product of top-bar hive beekeeping.

== Philosophy ==
Top-bar hives are popular with some beekeepers who believe it is a more natural form of beekeeping. Their building does not usually require such precise measurements as modern multi-story hives.

== Tub shaped top-bar hive ==
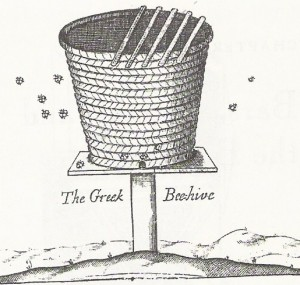
Short top-bar hive from Greece, as depicted in 1682

Although modern "long" top-bar hives originated in the middle of the twentieth century, initially for use in development projects, a "tub shaped" top-bar hive has been in use for centuries in some regions such as Greece. An example of the tub shaped top-bar hive is the so-called Greek hive that was first described in the 17th century and has been used in Crete until recently. Tub shaped top-bar hives are usually small enough to be portable, and allow beekeeping methods that involve periodic merging and splitting of colonies.

Bee hives that conform to the general description of top-bar hives have existed for many centuries. The earliest known possible mention of a bee hive with removable top-bars is in Giovanni di Bernardo Rucellai's didactic poem Le Api, written in 1539.

The travelling pair George Wheler and Jacques Spon witnessed a beekeeping method using woven tub shaped top-bar hives in Greece in 1676. Spon briefly mentioned this in his memoirs, but Wheler gave a detailed description and a drawing of such a hive in his work Journey Into Greece, published in 1682. The dimensions of that hive (including the supposed width of the top-bars and the angle of the hive sides) are variously indicated in modern citations of Wheler's work, but that is pure fiction, since Wheler himself mentioned no dimensions in his book.

The beekeeper Zuanne Papadopoli described tub shaped top-bar beekeeping in clay pots that were used prior to 1669 in Crete. He wrote about it in his memoirs in 1696.

In 1790, Abbot Della Rocca from Syros also wrote about tub shaped top-bar bee hives used in Crete during his time.

Although there is evidence that beekeeping was commonly practiced in Crete since the Late Minoan I period (1600–1450 BC), the most common method of beekeeping in that region is using clay or woven long, cylindrical hives.

Thomas Wildman described tub shaped top-bar hives as "skeps that are open at the top" in his Treatise on the management of bees in 1768.

Greek "Anástomo" bee hives, wicker or made from clay, are round in shape and have top-bar frames. At Kythira Greece we find rectangular top bar hives made from stone which are considered the first top bar hives with fully interchangeable combs.

== Tanzanian top-bar hive ==
Although the term "Tanzanian" top-bar hive is currently used in English-speaking countries to denote a Kenyan top-bar hive with straight sides instead of sloping sides, the original Tanzanian top-bar hive was developed independent of the Kenyan hive, and had design features that do not occur in modern so-called Tanzanian top-bar hives.

Until the 1960s, beekeepers in rural Tanzania used predominantly log hives, which consisted of a cylinder with closed ends and a harvesting hole near the middle. The fact that harvesting was done from the middle of the log meant that brood comb was destroyed every time honey was harvested. The Tanzanian government then promoted two alternative hive types, namely a log hive that could be harvested from either end (so that the brood nest in the centre remains undisturbed) and a plank hive, which was a simple top-bar hive. The plank hive did not use moveable top bars, however – bees would attach comb in natural patterns to the roof. The advantage of the plank hive was that it enabled some inspection before harvest.

The researcher G. Ntenga then designed a transitional hive, in 1972, based on the plank hive that uses moveable top-bars. This hive is sometimes called the Tanzanian Transitional Hive in literature, and was the original Tanzanian top-bar hive. Ntenga's hive had very precise measurements. It used top-bars with either a centre groove, a V-shaped bevel, or flat surface. The top-bars had lugs that were narrower than the bar itself. The hive could take 28 combs. The hive was covered with two lids, each covering half the hive.

One variation of Ntenga's hive used top-bars of 60 mm (2 1/4 in) instead of 30 mm (1 1/4 in) wide, that would each carry two combs instead of one.

== Kenyan top-bar hive ==
The hive commonly referred to as the Kenyan top-bar hive (KTBH) was developed by Dr. Maurice V. Smith and Dr. Gordon Townsend from the University of Guelph in Canada, sponsored by the Canadian International Development Agency (CIDA) under an initial four year overseas project which began in Kenya in 1971. The hive and its development was subsequently and extensively described by Dr. Isaac Kirea Kigatiira from Kenya, who was a student at Guelph in the early 1970s.

Although the hive's management differs strongly from the tub shaped Greek hive, early publications about the Kenyan hive often mention the Greek hive as an inspiration for the Kenyan hive.

The original Kenyan hive was designed to hang from trees or poles. Other modern variations of this hive, such as the Jackson hive used in South Africa, are also intended as hanging hives. Hanging the hive some distance from the ground protects it from both wild and domestic animals, as well as from ants and beetles.

A version with straight sides was developed by Henry Mulzac by 1977, which used Langstroth compatible dimensions. The South African Jackson hive also uses Langstroth sized frames.

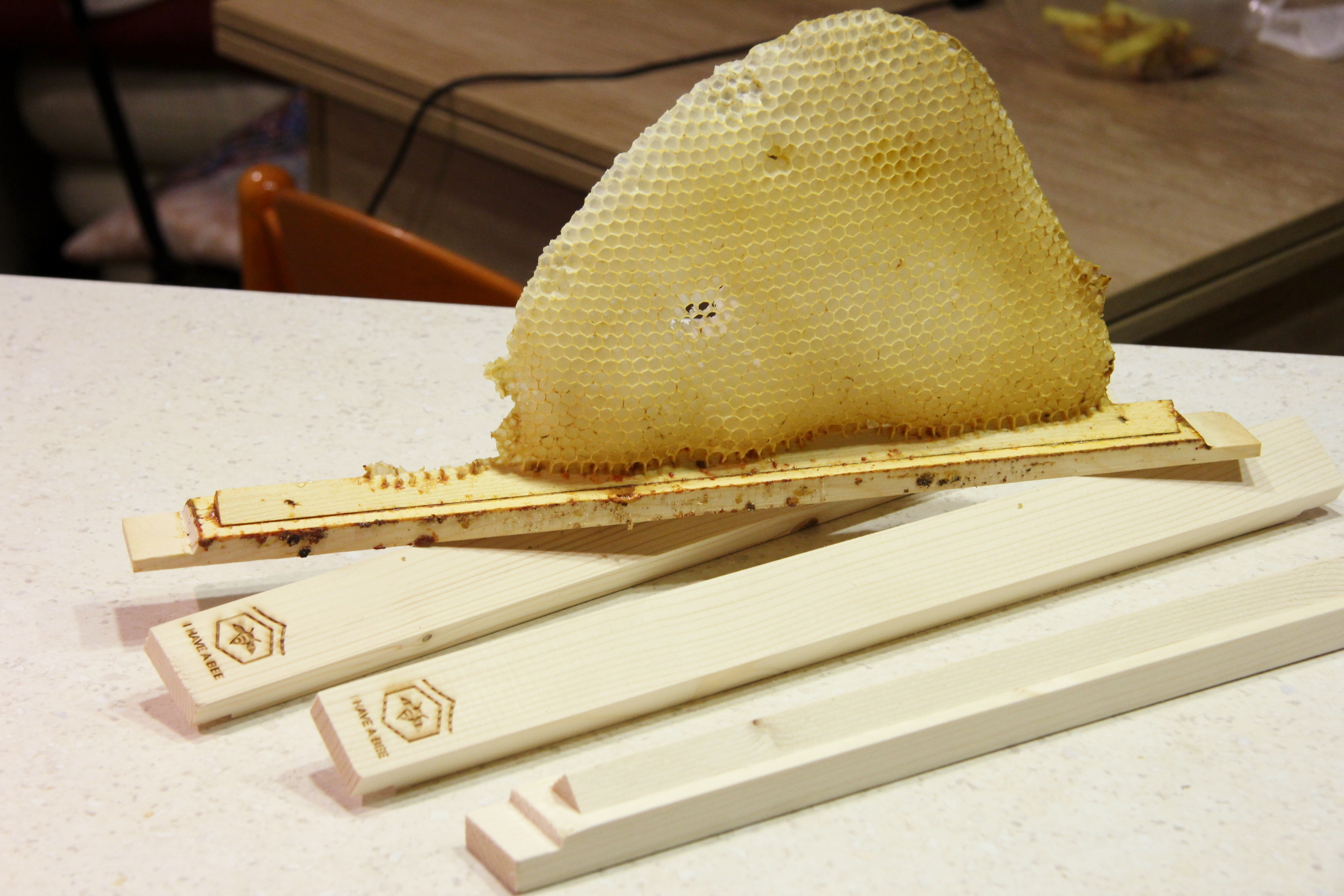
Natural wax comb
