= Petro Prokopovych =

Ukrainian innovative beekeeper

Petro Ivanovych Prokopovych
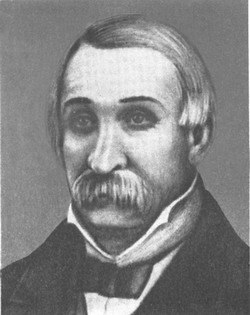
- Born: Петро Іванович Прокопович; 29 June 1775; Mytchenky (Митченки), Russian Empire now Chernihiv, Ukraine
- Died: 1850 (aged 74–75); Palchyky (Пальчики), Russian Empire Now Ukraine Chernihiv Oblast
- Education: NaUKMA
- Known for: Founder of commercial beekeeping
- Children: Stepan Petrovych Velykdan

Petro Prokopovych (1775–1850, Ukrainian: Петро Прокопович) was a Ukrainian beekeeper who made revolutionary contributions to the practice. They include the founding of commercial beekeeping and the invention of the first movable frame hive. He introduced novelties in traditional beekeeping that allowed great progress in the practice. Among his most important inventions was a hive frame in a separate honey chamber of his beehive. He also invented a crude queen excluder between brood and honey chambers. Petro Prokopovych was also the first to ever model a 'bee beard' after delineating and calculating 'bee swarm behaviour", inspiring students for generations.

== Biography ==
Prokopovych was born in Ukraine (then part of the Russian Empire), in the village of Mytchenky near Baturyn on June 29, 1775, into a clerical family of priests of Ukrainian Cossack descent. Starting at the age of eleven, he studied at the Kyiv-Mohyla Academy for eight years. After studies he committed to a military career. He resigned his commission in 1798, bearing officer rank, and enjoyed retirement at his brother's apiary. By 1808 Prokopovych had 580 beehives.

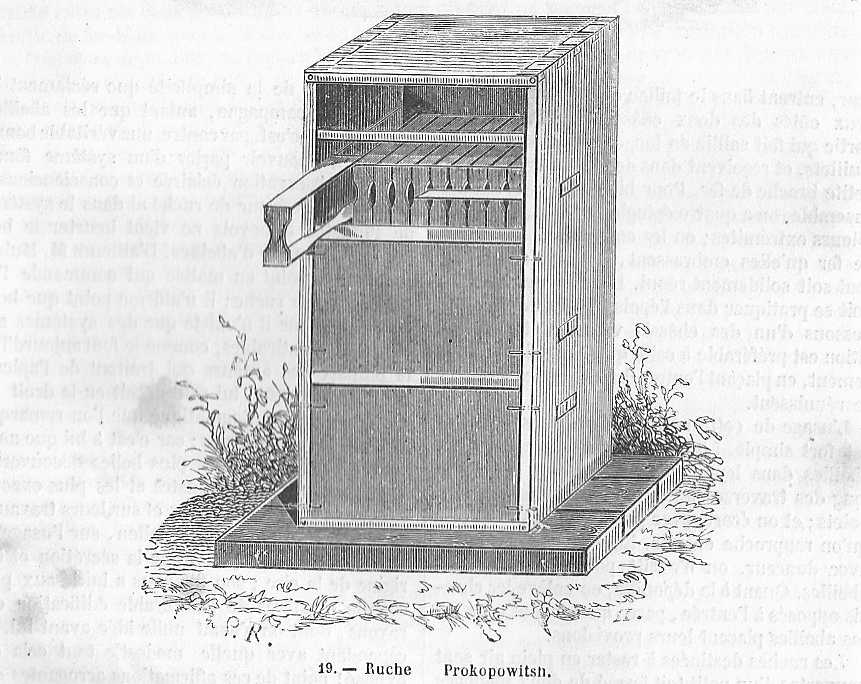
Prokopovych's beehive system.

Prokopovych studied the biology of bee colonies and strove to improve existing methods of beekeeping.

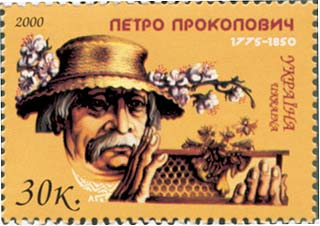
Ukrainian stamp honoring Prokopovych, 2000.

His main intention was to develop methods that allowed the least disturbance and damage to bees. These efforts resulted in 1814 in the invention of the world's first frame hive, which allowed an easier honey harvest.

Another invention was a wooden partition with apertures passable only by worker bees, now called a queen excluder. It made possible the harvest of pure honey from the frames. Prokopovych's inventions represented a landmark in the history of beekeeping and marked the beginning of commercial beekeeping. His scientific work resulted in more than sixty articles in printed media such as newspapers and magazines.

Prokopovych's revelatory invention of the world's first dismountable and portable frame hive allowed keepers to freely inspect the bee colonies and remove honey without destroying the bees. Previously the usual practice was to kill all the bees with smoke before taking the honey.

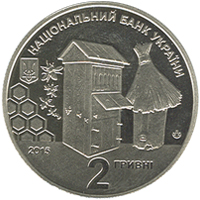
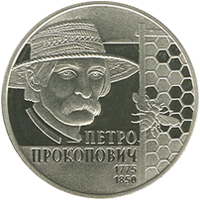
Commemorative coin featuring Prokopovych, 2015.

Another passion of Prokopovych was teaching. He set up a beekeeping school that prepared more than 700 qualified beekeepers over its 53 years of existence. As a beekeeper, Prokopovych owned 6600 colonies and became wealthy.

Prokopovych was buried in the village of Palchyky, currently in Nizhyn Raion of Chernihiv Oblast, where his beekeepers' school was located. A monument to Prokopovych stands there, and the Ukrainian Institute of Beekeeping is named after him.

In 2015, a 2 Hryvni coin was crafted to commemorate his contribution to Ukrainian beekeeping and sustainable commercial agronomy.

== Sources ==
- Beekeeping in Ukraine
- Biography of Petro Prokopovych
- Article about Prokopovych (in Ukrainian)
