= August von Berlepsch =

German beekeeper (1815-1877)

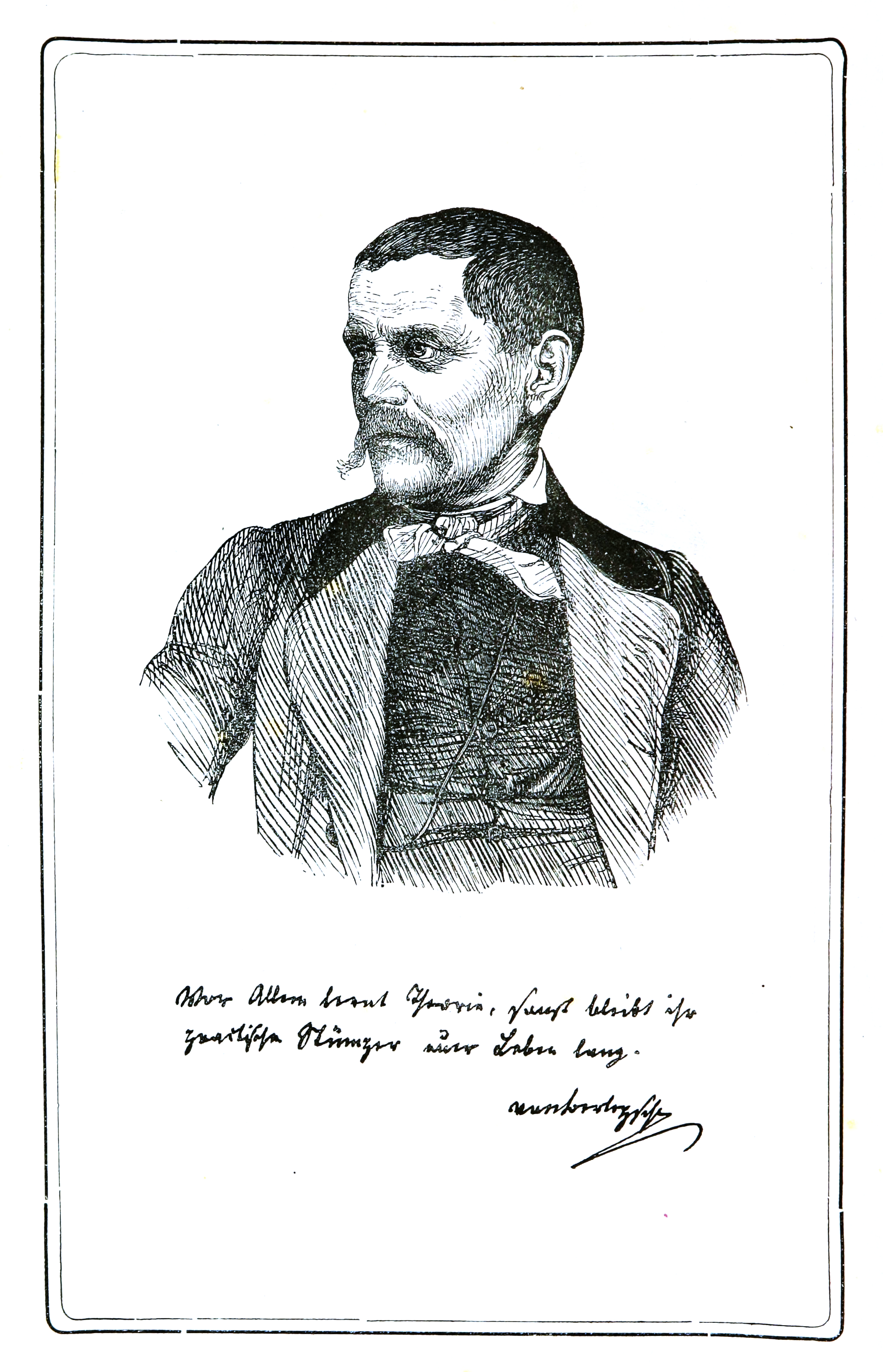
August von Berlepsch

Baron August Sittich Eugen Heinrich von Berlepsch (28 June 1815 – 17 September 1877) was a German bee-keeper who innovated the movable frame for use in bee-hives and wrote several treatises on beekeeping.

== Life and work ==
Berlepsch was born in Seebach to August (1792–1841) and Therese from Wolfersdorf. He studied law and theology in Gotha, Halle and Bonn and trained in the court of Mühlhausen from 1836 to 1838 before taking over his father's estate. He took a lot of interest in bee-keeping and invented the movable frame instead of the older Dzierzon honeycomb sticks in 1853. This allowed the removal of bee combs without destroying the complete hive structure. He was also able to study the life of honeybees, using a glass door to the hive, and was able to confirm Johann Dzierzon's theory that drones were formed by parthenogenesis.

Berlepsch is buried in the old southern cemetery in Munich and a street in Munich Sendling was named after him as Berlepschstrasse in 1886.

== Writings ==
- 1860: Die Biene und ihre Zucht mit beweglichen Waben in Gegenden ohne Spätsommertracht
- 1860: Die Biene und die Bienenzucht in honigarmen Gegenden nach dem gegenwärtigen Standpunct der Theorie und Praxis
- 1875: Die Bienenzucht nach ihrem jetzigen rationellen Standpunkt
