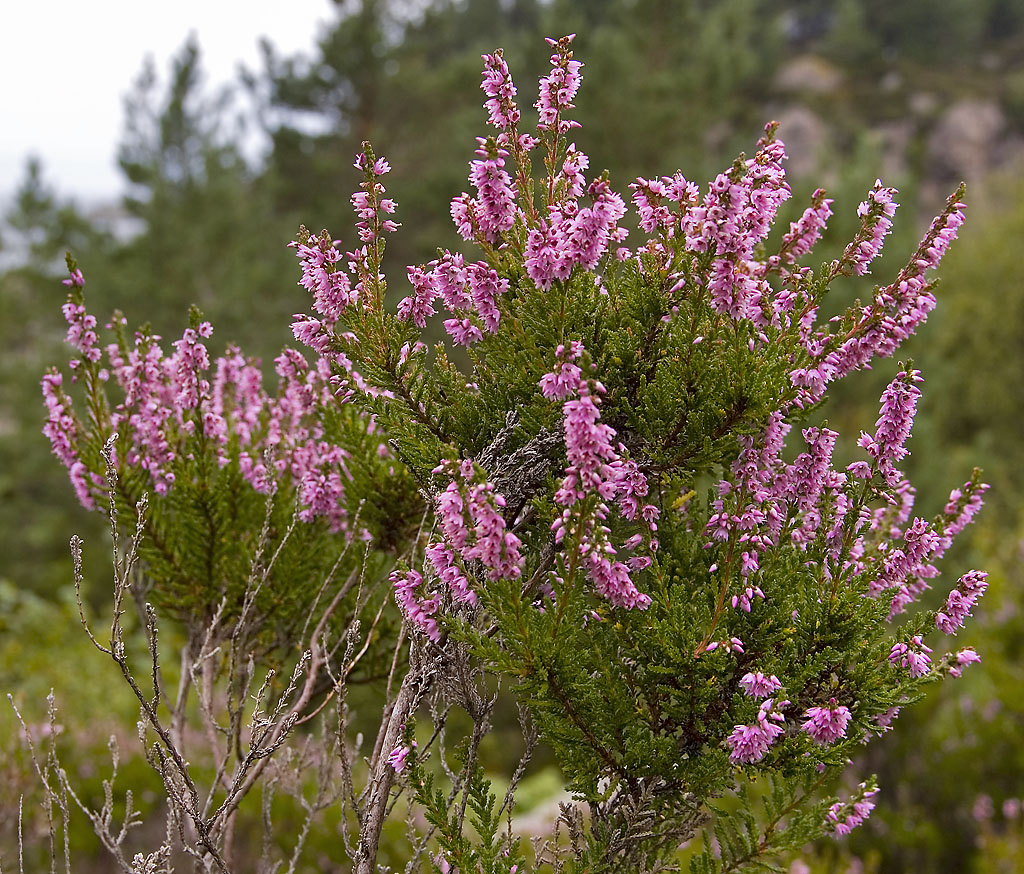
- Flowering Calluna vulgaris

Scientific classification
- Kingdom: Plantae
- Clade: Tracheophytes
- Clade: Angiosperms
- Clade: Eudicots
- Clade: Asterids
- Order: Ericales
- Family: Ericaceae
- Subfamily: Ericoideae
- Tribe: Ericeae
- Genus: Calluna; Salisb.
- Species: C. vulgaris

Binomial name
- Calluna vulgaris (L.) Hull

= Calluna =

Flowering plant in the heather family

Calluna vulgaris, common heather, ling, or simply heather, is the only accepted species in the genus Calluna in the flowering plant family Ericaceae. It is a low-growing evergreen shrub growing to 20 to 50 centimetres (8 to 20 in) tall, or rarely to 1 metre (40 in) and taller, and is found widely in Europe and Asia Minor on acidic soils in open sunny situations and in moderate shade.

It is the dominant plant in most heathland and moorland in Europe, and in some bog vegetation and acidic pine and oak woodland. It is tolerant of grazing and regenerates following occasional burning, and is often managed in nature reserves and grouse moors by sheep or cattle grazing, and also by light burning.

== Description ==
Calluna can reach 60 centimetres (24 in) in height. It has small scale leaves (less than 2–3 mm long) borne in opposite and decussate pairs, whereas those of Erica are generally larger and in whorls of 3–4, sometimes 5. It flowers from July to September. In wild plants these are normally mauve, but white-flowered plants also occur occasionally. They are terminal in racemes with sepal-like bracts at the base with a superior ovary, the fruit a capsule. Unlike Erica, Calluna sometimes sports double flowers. Calluna is sometimes referred to as Summer (or Autumn) heather to distinguish it from winter or spring flowering species of Erica.

=== Chemistry ===
Phenolic compounds in the shoots of Calluna vulgaris include chlorogenic acid and a novel phenolic glycoside, most of which are found in greater number during the summer.

The nectar of Calluna vulgaris contains a megastigmane, callunene, that is inhibitory at naturally occurring concentrations to a common trypanosome parasite of bumble bees, Crithidia bombi. Koch et al. elucidate the mechanism of activity that results in the loss of the parasite's flagellum, leading to reduced infectivity, because the flagellum is crucial to anchoring in the insect gut.

== Taxonomy ==
Calluna was separated from the closely related genus Erica by Richard Anthony Salisbury, who devised the generic name Calluna probably from Ancient Greek kallýnō ([καλλύνω]) 'beautify, sweep clean', in reference to its traditional use in besoms. The specific epithet vulgaris is Latin for 'common'. Calluna is differentiated from Erica by its corolla and calyx each being in four parts instead of five.

== Distribution and habitat ==
Calluna vulgaris is native to Europe, Iceland, the Faroe Islands, and the Azores. It has been introduced into many other places worldwide with suitable climates, including North America, Australia, New Zealand and the Falkland Islands. It is extremely cold-hardy, surviving severe exposure and freezing conditions well below −20 °C (−4 °F).

== Ecology ==
Heather is an important food source for various sheep and deer which can graze the tips of the plants when snow covers low-growing vegetation. Willow grouse and red grouse feed on the young shoots and seeds of this plant. Both adult and larva of the heather beetle (Lochmaea suturalis) feed on it, and can cause extensive mortality in some instances. The larvae of a number of Lepidoptera species also feed on the plant, notably the small emperor moth Saturnia pavonia.

=== As an invasive species ===
The plant was introduced to New Zealand and has become an invasive weed in some areas, notably the Tongariro National Park and Mount Ruapehu in the North Island, as well as the Wilderness Reserve (Te Anau) in the South Island, overgrowing native plants. Heather beetles have been released to stop the heather, with preliminary trials successful to date.

== Cultivars ==
There are many named cultivars, selected for variation in flower colour and for different foliage colour and growing habits.

Different cultivars have flower colours ranging from white, through pink and a wide range of purples, and including reds. The flowering season with different cultivars extends from late July to November in the northern hemisphere. The flowers may turn brown but still remain on the plants over winter, and this can lead to interesting decorative effects. Cultivars with ornamental foliage are usually selected for reddish and golden leaf colour. A few forms can be silvery grey. Many of the ornamental foliage forms change colour with the onset of winter weather, usually increasing in intensity of colour. Some forms are grown for distinctive young spring foliage.

The following cultivars have gained the Royal Horticultural Society's Award of Garden Merit:

- 'Alicia' (Garden Girls series)
- 'Annemarie'
- 'Beoley Gold'
- 'County Wicklow'
- 'Dark Beauty'
- 'Dark Star'
- 'Darkness'
- 'Elsie Purnell'
- 'Firefly'
- 'Kerstin'
- 'Kinlochruel'
- 'Peter Sparkes'
- 'Robert Chapman'
- 'Silver Queen'
- 'Sister Anne'
- 'Spring Cream'
- 'Tib'
- 'Velvet Fascination'
- 'Wickwar Flame'
- 'White Coral'

== Uses ==
Formerly heather was used to dye wool yellow and to tan leather. With malt, heather is an ingredient in gruit, a mixture of flavourings used in the brewing of heather-beer during the Middle Ages before the use of hops. Thomas Pennant wrote in A Tour in Scotland (1769) that on the Scottish island of Islay "ale is frequently made of the young tops of heath, mixing two thirds of that plant with one of malt, sometimes adding hops". "Heath Beer" is mentioned in the recipe book of Lady Ann Fanshawe (compiled from 1651).

From time immemorial heather has been used for making besoms, a practice recorded in "Buy Broom Buzzems" a song probably written by William Purvis (Blind Willie) (1752–1832) from Newcastle-upon-Tyne, England.

Heather honey is a highly valued product in moorland and heathland areas, with many beehives being moved there in late summer. Not always as valued as it is today, it was dismissed as mel improbum, "unwholesome honey" by Dioscurides. Heather honey has a characteristic strong taste, and an unusual texture, for it is thixotropic, being a jelly until stirred, when it becomes a syrup like other honey, but then sets again to a jelly. This makes the extraction of the honey from the comb difficult, and it is therefore often sold as comb honey.

White heather is regarded in Scotland as being lucky, a tradition brought from Balmoral to England by Queen Victoria and sprigs of it are often sold as a charm and worked into bridal bouquets.

Heather stalks are used by a small industry in Scotland as a raw material for sentimental jewellery. The stalks are stripped of bark, dyed in bright colours and then compressed with resin.

Calluna vulgaris herb has been used in the traditional Austrian medicine internally as tea for treatment of disorders of the kidneys and urinary tract.

== In culture ==
First Snow on Broughton Moor, 1890 oil painting by James Henry Crossland, depicting a heathland scene with heather in the Lake District

Heather is seen as iconic of Scotland, where the plant grows widely. When poems like Bonnie Auld Scotland speak of "fragrant hills of purple heather', when the hero of Kidnapped flees through the heather, when heather and Scotland are linked in the same sentence, the heather talked about is Calluna vulgaris.

Purple heather is one of the two national flowers of Norway, the other being Saxifraga cotyledon. It was chosen as a national flower on the basis of a vote of popularity in a Norwegian radio show in 1976.

Calluna vulgaris is the province flower of the Swedish province of Västergötland.

== See also ==
- Heath (habitat)
- Erica
