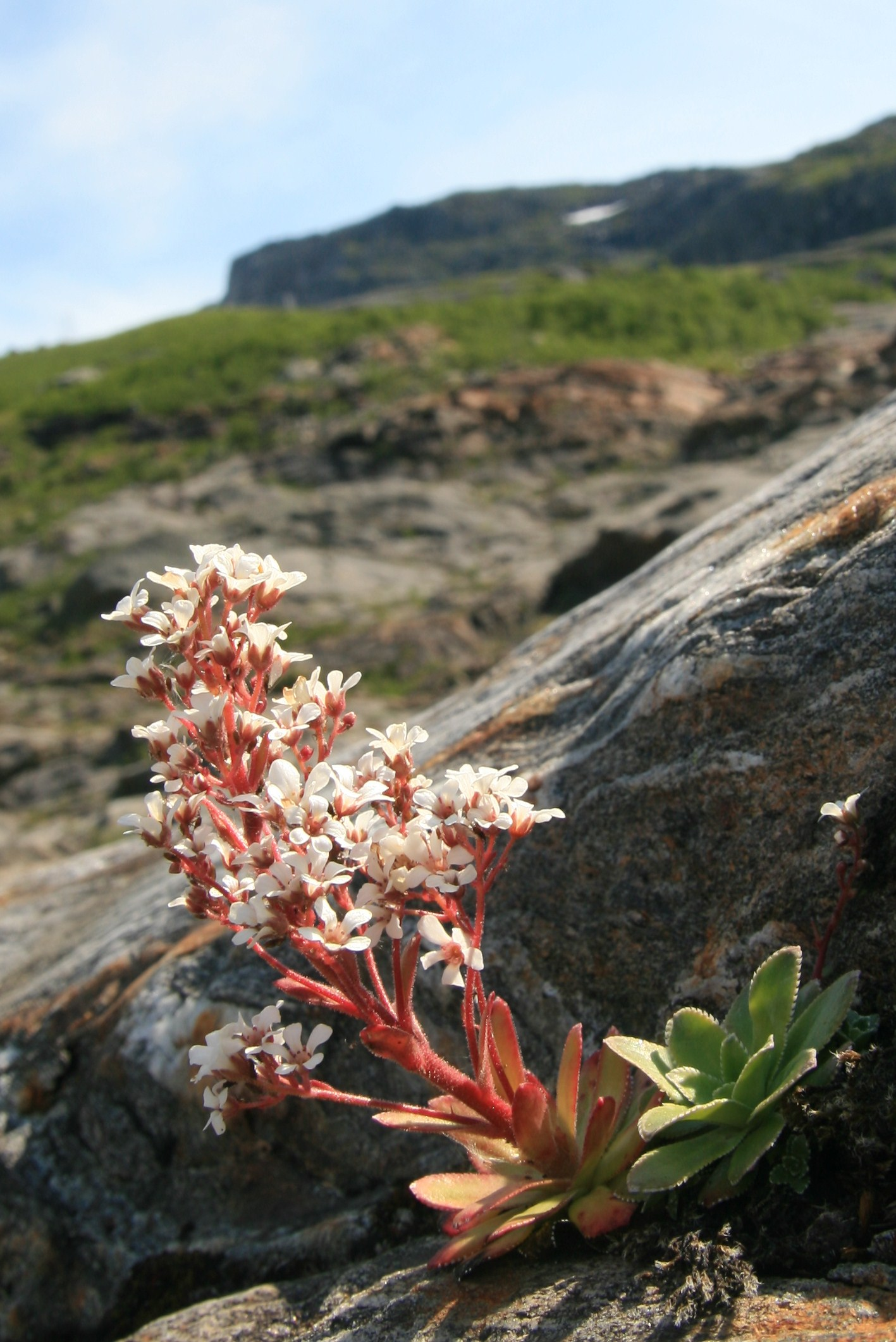

Scientific classification
- Kingdom: Plantae
- Clade: Tracheophytes
- Clade: Angiosperms
- Clade: Eudicots
- Order: Saxifragales
- Family: Saxifragaceae
- Genus: Saxifraga
- Species: S. cotyledon

Binomial name
- Saxifraga cotyledon L.

= Saxifraga cotyledon =

Species of flowering plant

Saxifraga cotyledon, the pyramidal saxifrage, is a species of flowering plant that occurs in the mountains of Europe. It has rosettes about 20 centimetres (8 in) across of tongue-shaped leaves, beaded but not toothed. In May or June the tall panicles of white flowers, branched and pyramidal in outline, may reach 60 cm (24 in). It is one of Norway's two national flowers (chosen in 1935), the other national flower being Calluna. Its relationship to the "silver saxifrages" (Saxifraga sect. Ligulatae) remains to be resolved to full satisfaction.

== Distribution ==
Saxifraga cotyledon has an Arctic–alpine distribution, occurring in Scandinavia, Iceland, the Western Alps and the Pyrenees.

== Horticulture ==
To produce flowers it sometimes is necessary to remove and save for propagation all side rosettes. The flowering rosette dies after blooming.
