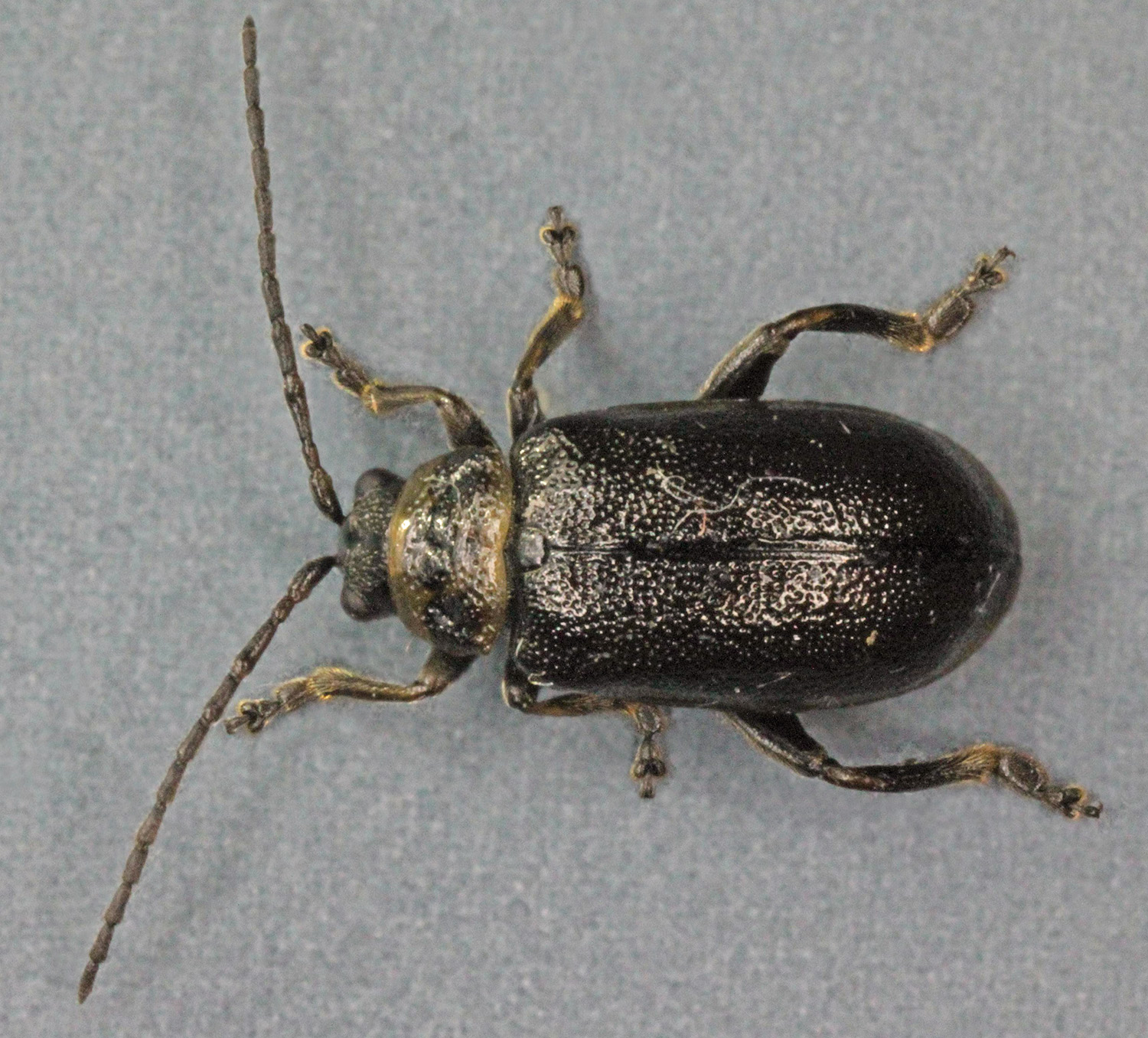
- Lochmaea suturalis, Fenn's Moss, North Wales

Scientific classification
- Kingdom: Animalia
- Phylum: Arthropoda
- Clade: Pancrustacea
- Class: Insecta
- Order: Coleoptera
- Suborder: Polyphaga
- Infraorder: Cucujiformia
- Family: Chrysomelidae
- Genus: Lochmaea
- Species: L. suturalis

Binomial name
- Lochmaea suturalis (Thomson, 1866)

= Lochmaea suturalis =

Species of beetle

Lochmaea suturalis, commonly referred to as the heather beetle, is a beetle of the genus Lochmaea native to north-west Europe. It feeds upon heather. They are difficult to spot as they are camouflaged with a brownish colour, and are about 6 millimetres (0.24 in) long. They have a tendency to hide, and they drop into the undergrowth if they are disturbed. They are easier to see when in large numbers on the same plant.

The adult beetle spends the winter in dormant diapause in moss or litter in the undergrowth of the heather plants, and they do this until the spring weather brings a rise in temperature, which stimulates them to emerge, feed, and reproduce. They are able to fly up to a range of several miles after spring emergence. They will generally do this after fire, when the surrounding heather is of poor quality, or if the heather has been browsed enough that it turns into grassland. They do however, have a level of resilience and are able to survive for some time in grassland such as Deschampsia flexuosa.
