= Franz Hruschka =

Austrian/Italian of Czech origin officer and beekeeper

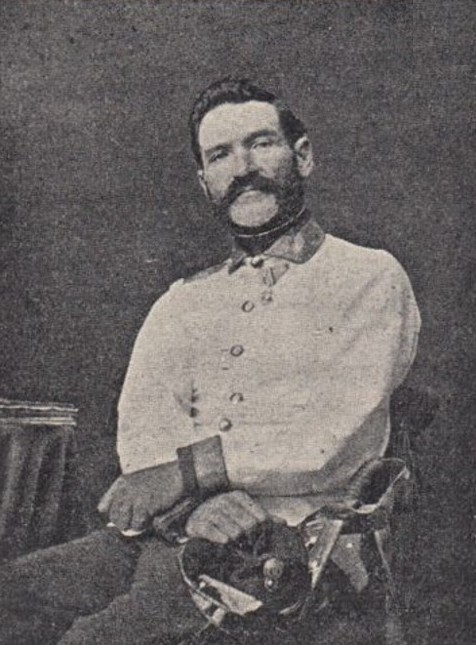
- Franz von Hruschka as a major (1857-1865)
- Born: May 13, 1819; Vienna, Austrian Empire
- Died: May 11, 1888 (aged 68); Venice, Kingdom of Italy
- Occupations: Officer in the Austrian Army beekeeper
- Known for: Inventor of the honey extractor Modern beekeeping advocate in Italy

Franz Hruschka, Franz von Hruschka, Francesco De Hruschka, František Hruška (May 13, 1819 – May 11, 1888) was an Austrian-Italian officer and beekeeper of Czech origin. He is known as the inventor of the honey extractor, an invention he presented in 1865 at the Brno Beekeeper Conference.

== Life ==
=== Early life ===
Franz von Hruschka was born on May 13, 1819, in Vienna, Austria, to Franz Ludwig Augustin von Hruschka, an officer in the Austrian Army and Anna Simon, the daughter of another officer. He spent his childhood in České Budějovice (today in the Czech Republic) and moved to Graz, Austria in 1827 completing elementary school and three years of secondary school.

=== Military ===
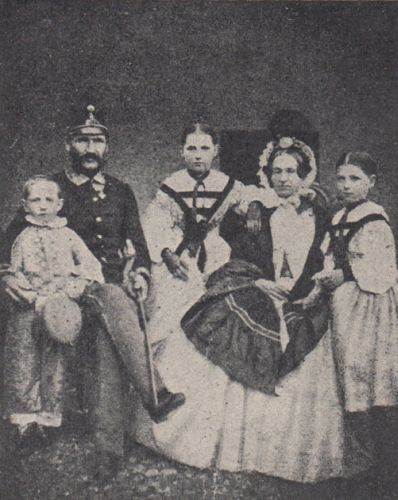
Left to right: Friedrich, Franz (father), Antonie, Antonia (mother) and Marie.

At 14 years old, he is drafted as a cadet of the 19th Infantry Regiment Hessen-Homburg but remains in a unit in Graz. He graduates from the cadet's school in 1836 having studied Czech language and moved back to Vienna with his regiment. He is reassigned to the Hungarian regiment Bakonyi number 33 based in Milan under Austrian rule at the time. He is promoted to the rank of officer cadet in 1840 and to lieutenant in 1844. In 1848, he joins the marines and promoted to ship sublieutenant. He receives the Military Merit Cross for his success during the Venezia Blockade. In 1849, he is promoted to the frigate lieutenant and in 1852 he becomes ship lieutenant.

In 1856, he leaves the Navy to go back to the Army and is assigned to the Infantry Regiment Culoz number 31. He is promoted to the rank of major in 1857 and commands the unit in Legnago in the Province of Verona. On August 1, 1865, he retires from the military and settles with his family in Dolo, Italy. The following year, the Kingdom of Lombardy–Venetia comes to an end with Venetia being transferred to Italy.

=== Family ===
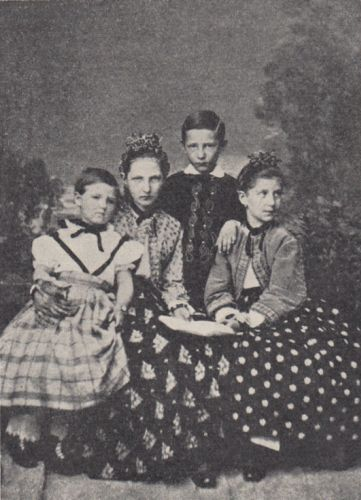
Left to right: Rosalie, Antonie, Friedrich and Marie Hruschka. Parents: Franz and Antonia Hruschka

In 1848, while a marines officer, Franz's boat was anchored in Trieste. A visit of the countess Schoenborn and her adopted daughter, Antonia Albrech (~1823 - January 16, 1893) visited his ship. Their courtship lasted two years as though he was a high-ranking officer, he was still poor at the time. They were finally married in 1850 and her dowry was worth 12,000 Guldens. She was the daughter of Josef and Antonie Albrech and was born around 1823 in Mór (now in Hungary). They lived in Dolo and had a house in Venezia, known as the Palazzo Brandolin Rota.

They had five children:

- Franz Hruschka: He was born on November 12, 1851, in Pula (Now in Croatia). He was sent to out at the age of 13 to be raised elsewhere. He became a post office clerk in Trieste. He died on May 5, 1922, estranged from his family of origin.
- Antonie Hruschka: She was born in 1852 in Venice and died in Dolo at the age of 16.
- Marie Hruschka: she was born in 1855 in Venice. She married Emilio Moretti and had a son in 1882.
- Friedrich Hruschka: He was born on October 18, 1857, in Legnago. He married Maria Binetti and had two daughters: Sophia and Irene.
- Rosalie Hruschka: She was born in 1861 in Legnago. she married Karl Rizziou, a salesman and had a son named George.

=== Beekeeping ===
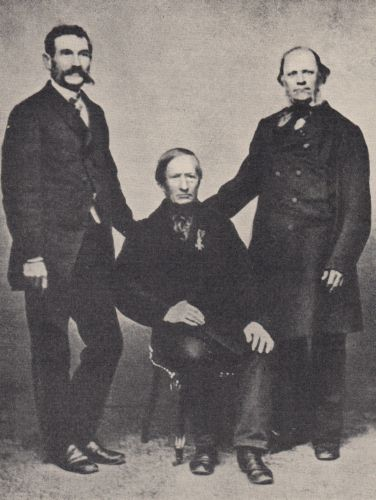
Left to right: Franz Hruschka, Johann Dzierzon and Andre Schmidt around 1870

It is unclear when he started keeping bees. It would have been difficult to keep bees in the military due to the frequent moves. Franz was keeping bees in Legnago according to his daughter Marie. He stated that he started offering practical and theoretical classes in 1863–1864. In 1867, in his letter to the Eichstätt Beekeepers News, he mentions that: Within the last twelve years only once we had a season like this..." indicating he may have started as early as 1856. In 1870, advertisements for his queens are described as "beautiful and mild mannered bees, guaranteed by a 12 years long selection process." This would put his breeding program starting in 1858. He also had subscriptions to between 12 and 14 magazines.

In 1865, he invented honey extractor, a simple machine for extracting honey from the comb by means of centrifugal force. The announcement was made at the 14th German and Austrian Beekeepers Conference in Brno (now in the Czech Republic) held from September 12 to September 14, 1865. While he shared the basic idea only with a few beekeepers the first day, it was with anticipation that his lecture took place on day 2. The demonstration and explanations sealed the deal.

In February 1866, he sends a letter to Eichstätt Beekeepers News from Legnago and then a letter to the same group on February 12, 1867, from Dolo which he signs: "k.k. Major, retired, Dolo bei Venedig". He had moved earlier the same year to Dolo, Contrada della Bassa No. 687. The house had a big garden in front of it with the northern side ending with the banks of the Brenta river lined with hedges. Franz used a boat to go the city center. The garden was filled with vine, fruit trees, roses and other flowers and a section was dedicated to growing vegetables. Hives of many designs were gathered in three main groups with some scattered around the garden. All the hives were facing east so as to be hit by the first rays of the morning sun.

Franz seem to have enjoyed his life in Dolo and he had extensive contacts with other beekeepers due to his fame as the inventor of the extractor in 1865. He is quoted as saying:

Italy is especially well suited for beekeeping. I say especially, because I've got in front of my eyes the landscape from where the first Italian bees were exported to Germany.

— Franz Hruscka - Dolo, 1868

Franz was very busy. He raised Italian queens for Germany and manufactured beekeeping equipment. He was also teaching and demonstrating the use of movable frames designed by Johann Dzierzon in 1838 leading to L. L. Langstroth patenting his beehive with movable frames in 1852 in the United States. Italy was opening up to modern beekeeping and Hruschka was at the forefront of this rapid movement. He gained significant fame in Italy and across Europe. He experimented with bee colonies living without hives in 1866 and 1867. He also experimented with mating queens.

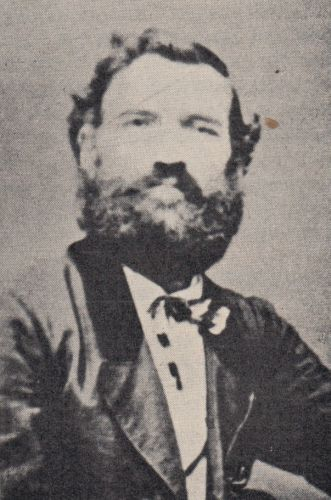
Franz Hruschka around 1871

He attended the German and Austrian Beekeepers conference held in Darmstadt September 8–10, 1868. He also visited several other exhibits in Verona and did presented at the Comizio Agrario di Dolo that same year where he offered to help with public beekeeping courses. He also attends a beekeeping exhibit in Milan that same year. In 1869, he teaches the beekeeping courses in Dolo and presented at several conferences in Germany and in Italy talking about wintering colonies, swarms, drones and faul brood.

His involvement in the beekeeping community seems to diminish starting in 1871. His apiary foreman, Angelo Lettame is still advertising in 1872. Two Italian bee queens are sent to the Vienna exhibition in 1873 by his apiary but that is the last time. He moves to Venice at the and keeps a few hives there.

=== End of his life ===
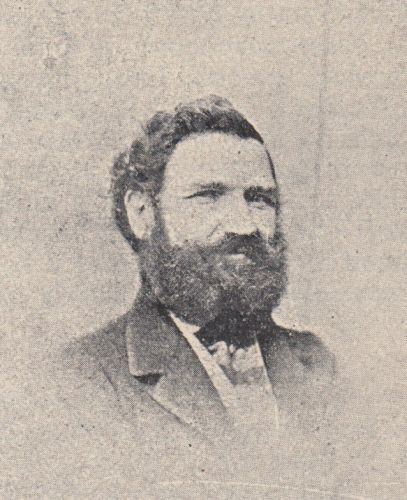
Franz Hruschka before his death

He lived in the Palazzo Brandolin Rota which he turned into a hotel and rented. It is believed this was the cause of his bankruptcy due possibly unscrupulous tenants and poor location. The farm in Dolo was sold in 1880 to attempt to salvage the enterprise but failed. The house was sold at auction, and he moved to a rented place in the Palazzo Rizzi with his wife, selling everything. He became a silent loner, not going anywhere for the last six years of his life. He died on May 8, 1888, of Angina pectoris in his apartment, and his funerals took place on May 11, 1888.

== Honey extractor ==
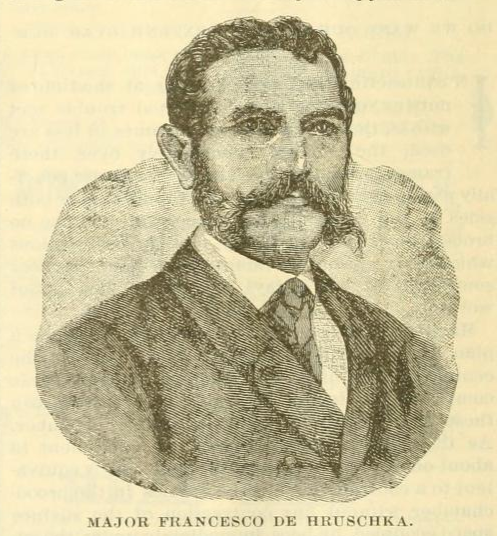
Franscesco De Hruschka in the Gleanings in Bee Culture issue of July 1888 where his obituary was published in the United-States

The exact date of the invention is not clear. On July 1, 1865, in an article in Eichstraett Beekeeping News, he explains his old crushing method of cutting the cells from the honeycomb base. This article would have been written in May or June of the same year. The same year, in September 1865, he makes the announcement to the Brno Beekeeper Conference of his invention. The first extractor was built by Bollinger Manufacturer in Vienna. The design was probably completed in July or August 1865.

His original idea was simply to support combs in a metal framework and then spin them around within a container to collect honey as it was thrown out by centrifugal force. This meant that honeycombs could be returned to a hive empty but undamaged, saving the bees a vast amount of time and energy rebuilding the wax.

According to him, the idea of using this force came from him visiting his bee yard one day with his young son. A frame of honey was put in a dish in a basket and his son started playing with it by whirling it by the rope attached to the handle. However, it is very probable that this story came after the announcement. In his article published July 1, 1865, he mentions his knowledge of centrifuging machines used in sugar refineries at the time and it is not impossible the jump to the honey extractor took place then.

The benefits were listed as follows:

- Faster harvest speed
- Respect of the quality of the honey especially with large quantities
- Preservation of the honeycomb for reuse in the hive.

His first version was a simple tin box with a wire cloth bottom and a funnel-shaped bottom. A glass was fastened at the bottom to collect the honey that would flow down. Soon after, the glass was replaced by a simple stopper and a rope was attached.

However this proved to be a very slow process. He designed a second upgraded version with a triangular frame anchored to the ground. A vertical shaft was attached to a 12 feet long horizontal beam with the first version bucket attached at the end. A rope was wrapped around the shaft and pulled in a similar way as a Bow drill. This would propel the honey outward using centrifuge force. because of the length of the beam, the speed of extraction was significantly faster but the size of the machine made its operation cumbersome.

Finally, he designed a smaller more compact extractor with a hand crank, two wheels and a string. All honey extractors are a derivative of this final model.

Scale models of these three extractors were presented in August 1868 at the Exposition des Insectes (the Insect Exposition) in Paris, France. According to Charles Dadant, they were entered by his foreman Angelo Lessame of Dolo, province of Venice.

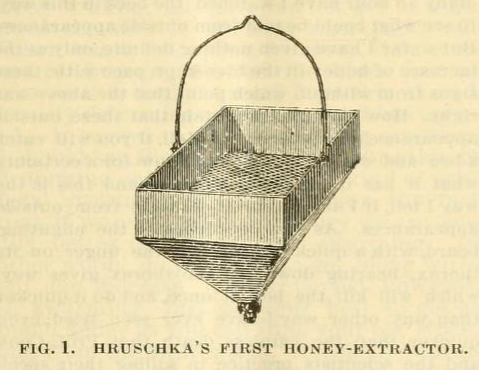
De Hruschka Extractor (first version)

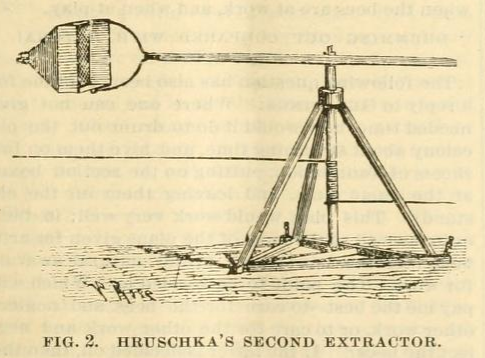
De Hruschka Extractor (second version)

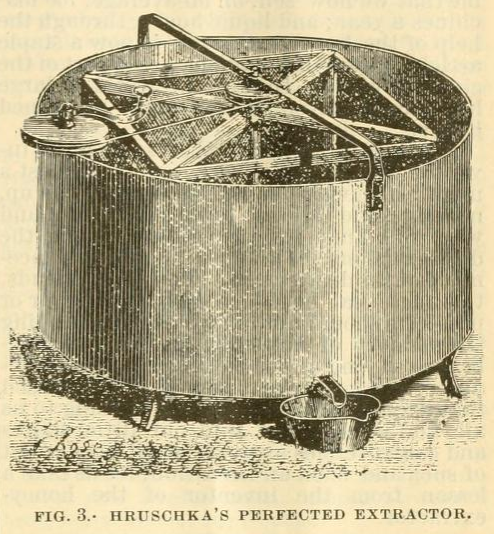
De Hruschka Extractor (final version)

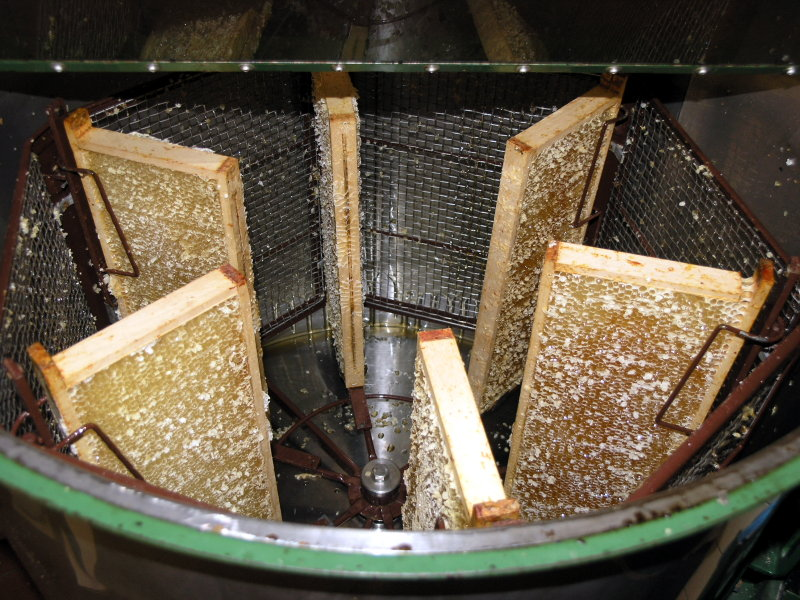
A modern-day honey extractor

The idea of the extractor was published in several beekeeping newspapers and several versions were manufactured and sold based on his invention. This single invention greatly improved the efficiency of honey harvesting and catalyzed the modern honey industry.

== See also ==
- Honey
- Hive frame
- Wax foundation
