= Lochmaea =

Scientific classification
- Kingdom: Animalia
- Phylum: Arthropoda
- Clade: Pancrustacea
- Class: Insecta
- Order: Coleoptera
- Suborder: Polyphaga
- Infraorder: Cucujiformia
- Family: Chrysomelidae
- Subfamily: Galerucinae
- Tribe: Galerucini
- Genus: Lochmaea; Weise, 1883

Type species
- Chrysomela caprea Linnaeus, 1758

Synonyms
- Lochmaeata Strand, 1935

Genus of leaf beetles

Lochmaea is a genus of beetles belonging to the family Chrysomelidae.

== Species ==
Fifteen species are currently included in the genus:

- Lochmaea caprea (Linnaeus, 1758)
- Lochmaea cheni Lee, 2019
- Lochmaea crataegi (Forster, 1771)
- Lochmaea huanggangana Yang & Wang, 1998
- Lochmaea jungchani Lee, 2019
- Lochmaea lesagei Kimoto, 1996
- Lochmaea limbata Pic, 1898
- Lochmaea machulkai Roubal, 1926
- Lochmaea maculata Kimoto, 1979
- Lochmaea nepalica Medvedev, 2005
- Lochmaea scutellata (Chevrolat, 1840)
- Lochmaea singalilaensis Takizawa, 1990
- Lochmaea smetanai Kimoto, 1996
- Lochmaea suturalis (Thomson, 1866)
- Lochmaea tsoui Lee, 2019
