= Palazzo Brandolin Rota =

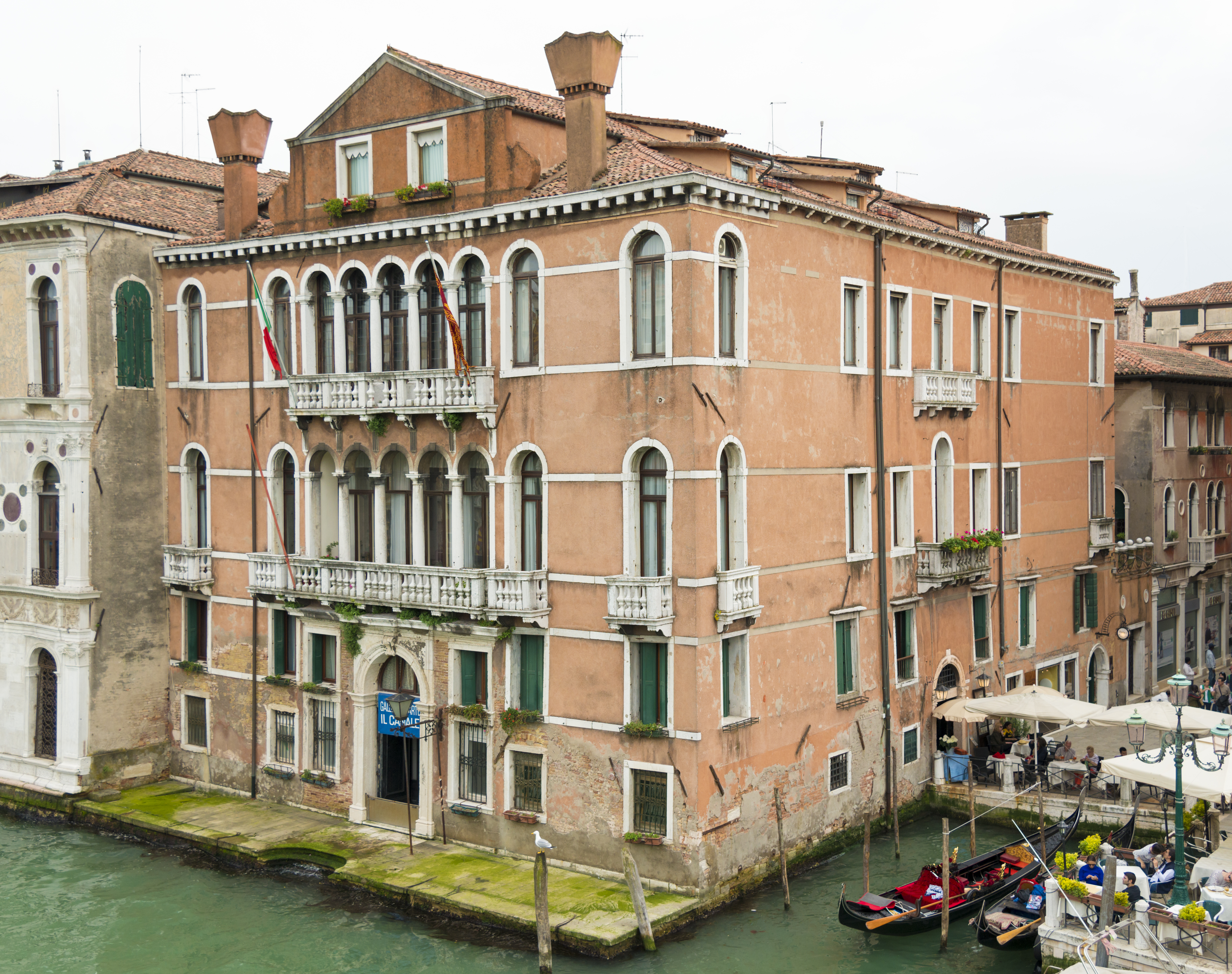
- Palazzo Brandolin Rota, façade on Grand Canal.
- Interactive map of the Palazzo Brandolin Rota area

General information
- Type: Residential
- Architectural style: Renaissance
- Location: Dorsoduro district, Venice, Italy
- Coordinates: 45°25′52.54″N 12°19′44.57″E
- Construction stopped: 17th century

Technical details
- Floor count: 3

Palazzo Brandolin Rota is a palace in Venice, Italy, located in the Dorsoduro district and overlooking the Grand Canal, between the Gallerie dell'Accademia and Palazzo Contarini Polignac.

== History ==
The palazzo was built in the 17th century, initially of only two floors. In the mid-18th century, the structure got to its present size and look. The palace was acquired in the second half of the 1800s by the nobleman Franz Edler von Hruschka. It is currently owned by the Brandolini Rota family.

In the 19th century, the palace was adapted to host the hotel Allbergo dell' Universo, and for a short time it became the home of the famous soprano Toti Dal Monte and poet Robert Browning. In more recent times, the palace hosted the Union of Societies, one of the last gentlemen's clubs in Italy.

The building is now a private home.

== Architecture ==
Palazzo Brandolin Rota is a three-storey building, with a mezzanine level between the ground floor and the first noble floor. The façade on the Grand Canal is quite simple, with a rounded water portal in the center. Each of the two noble floors—erected in different epochs but looking substantially the same—has nine round-headed openings, with the five central units joined to form pentaforas. The balustrades cover all the openings of the first noble floor and only the pentafora of the second one. The building has a raised façade on its top part, terminating with a tympanum of two square single-light windows and a pair of large chimneys.

== Gallery ==
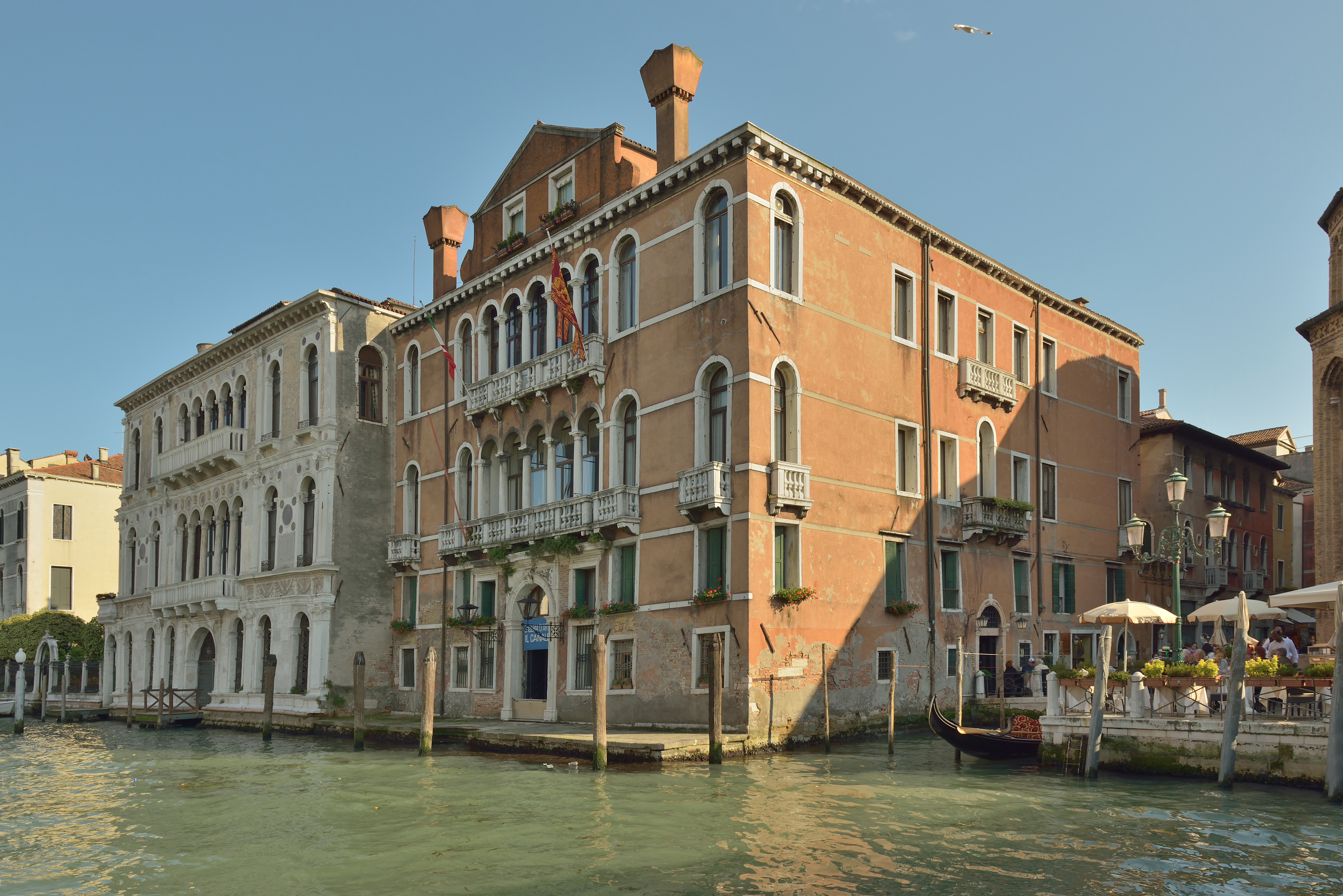
Palazzi Contarini Polignac and Brandolin Rota. Facades on Grand Canal.

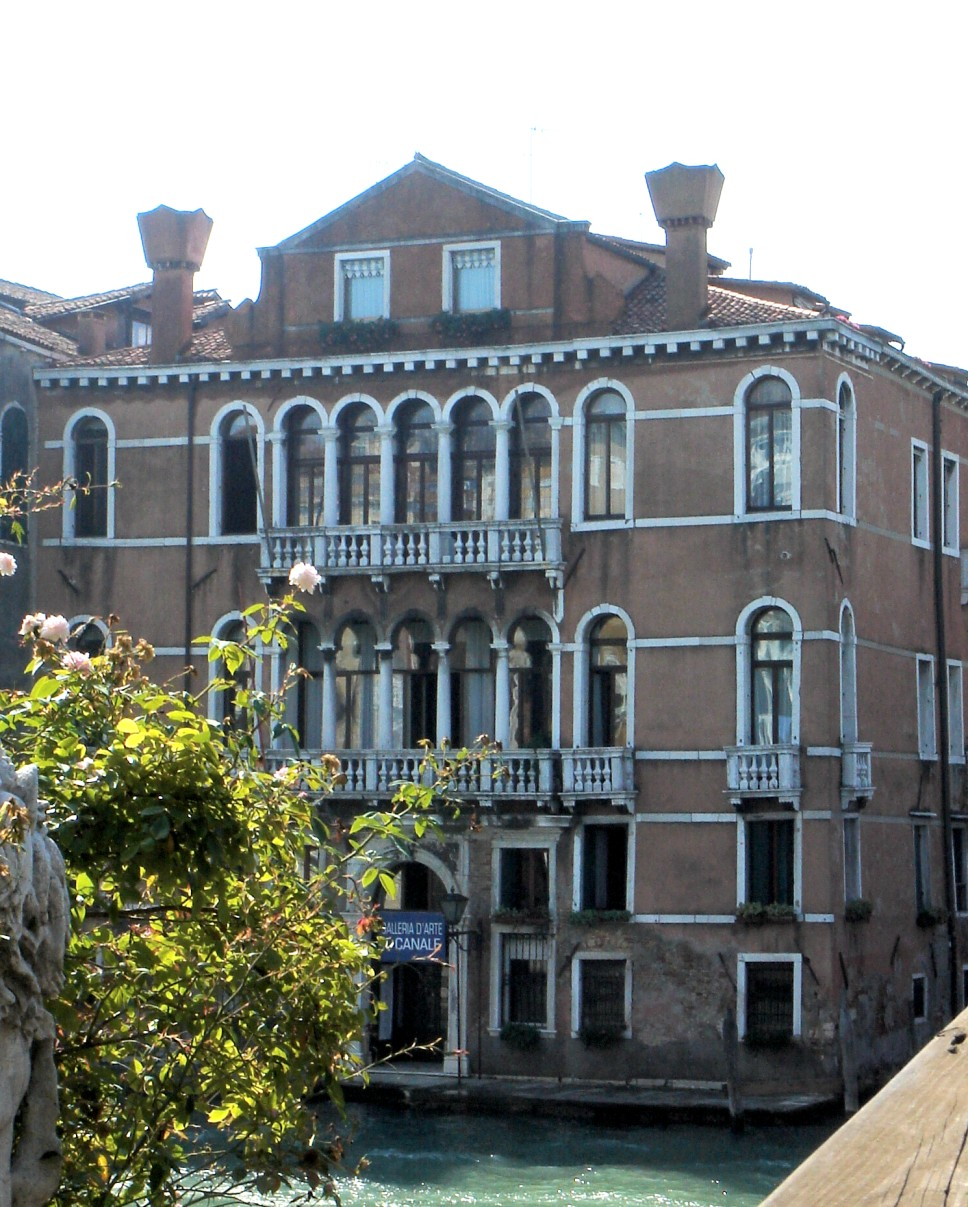
Facade details

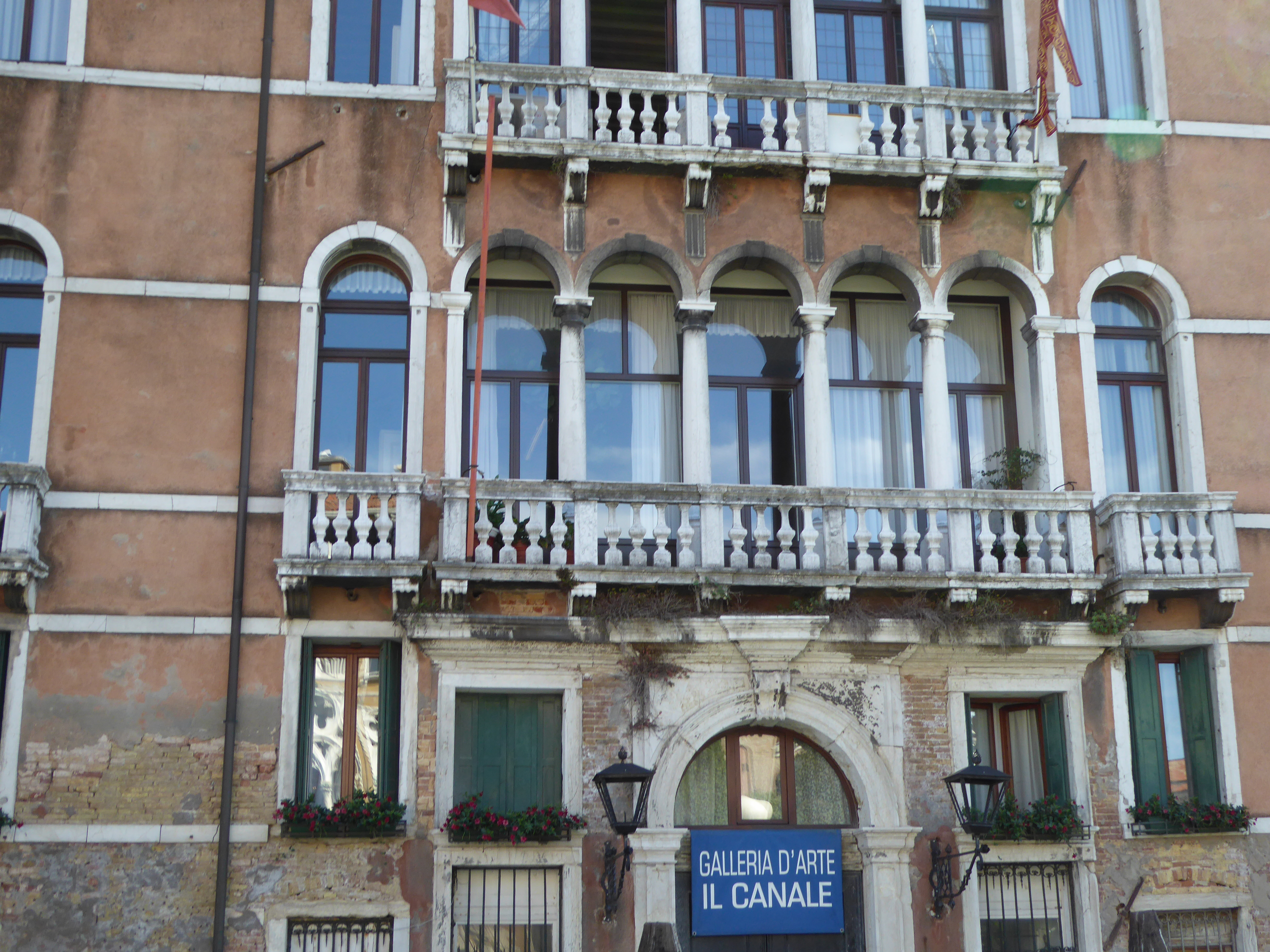
Balconies on facade

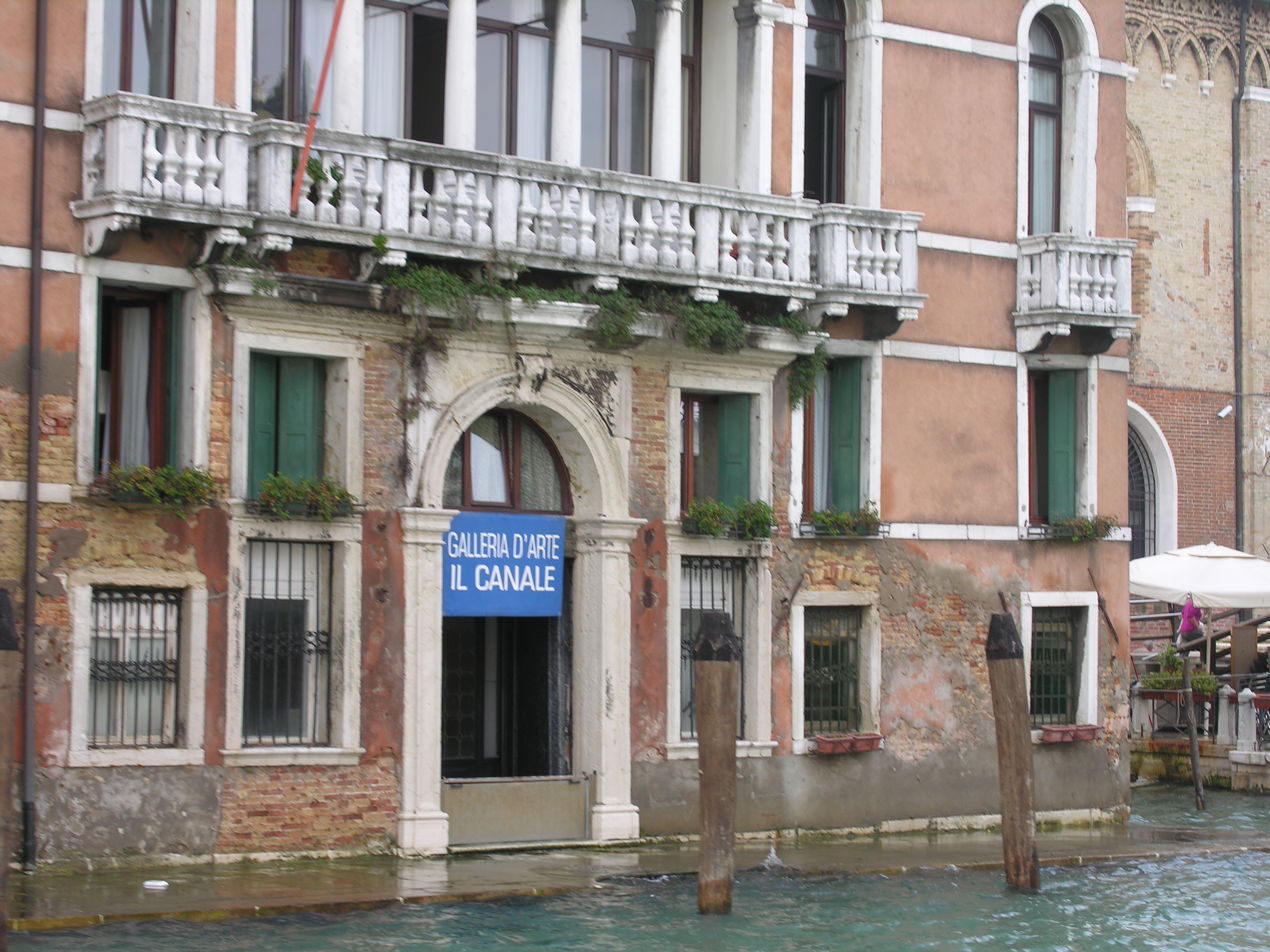
Central portal

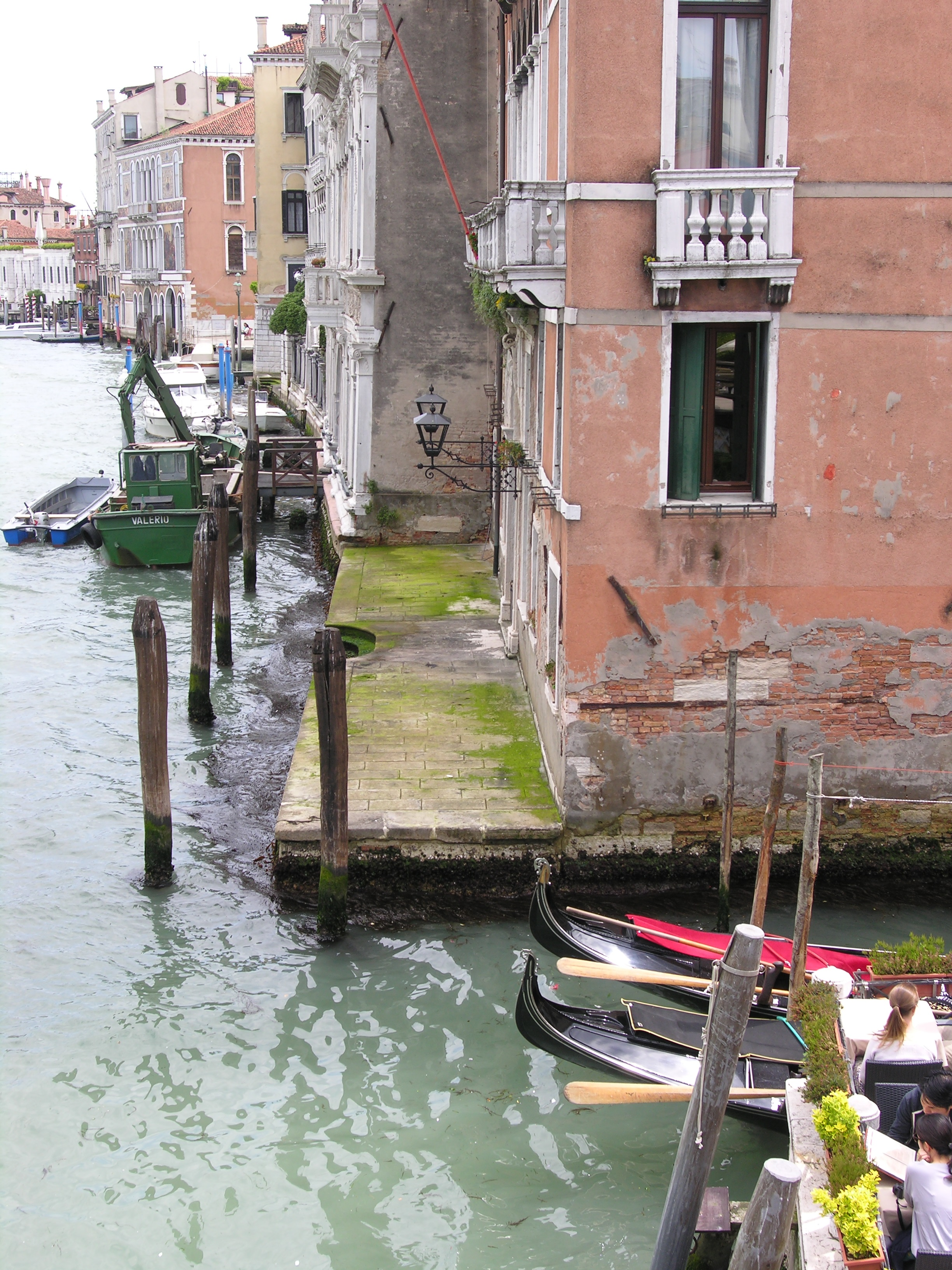
Ground level

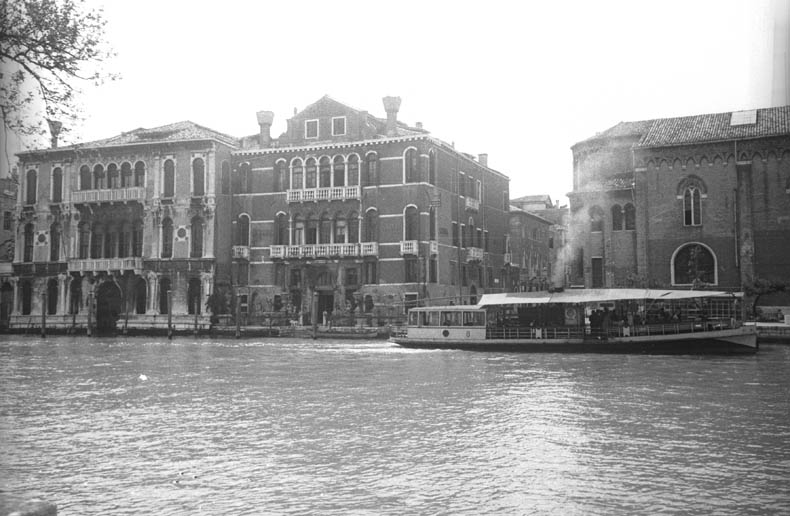
The palace in 1932

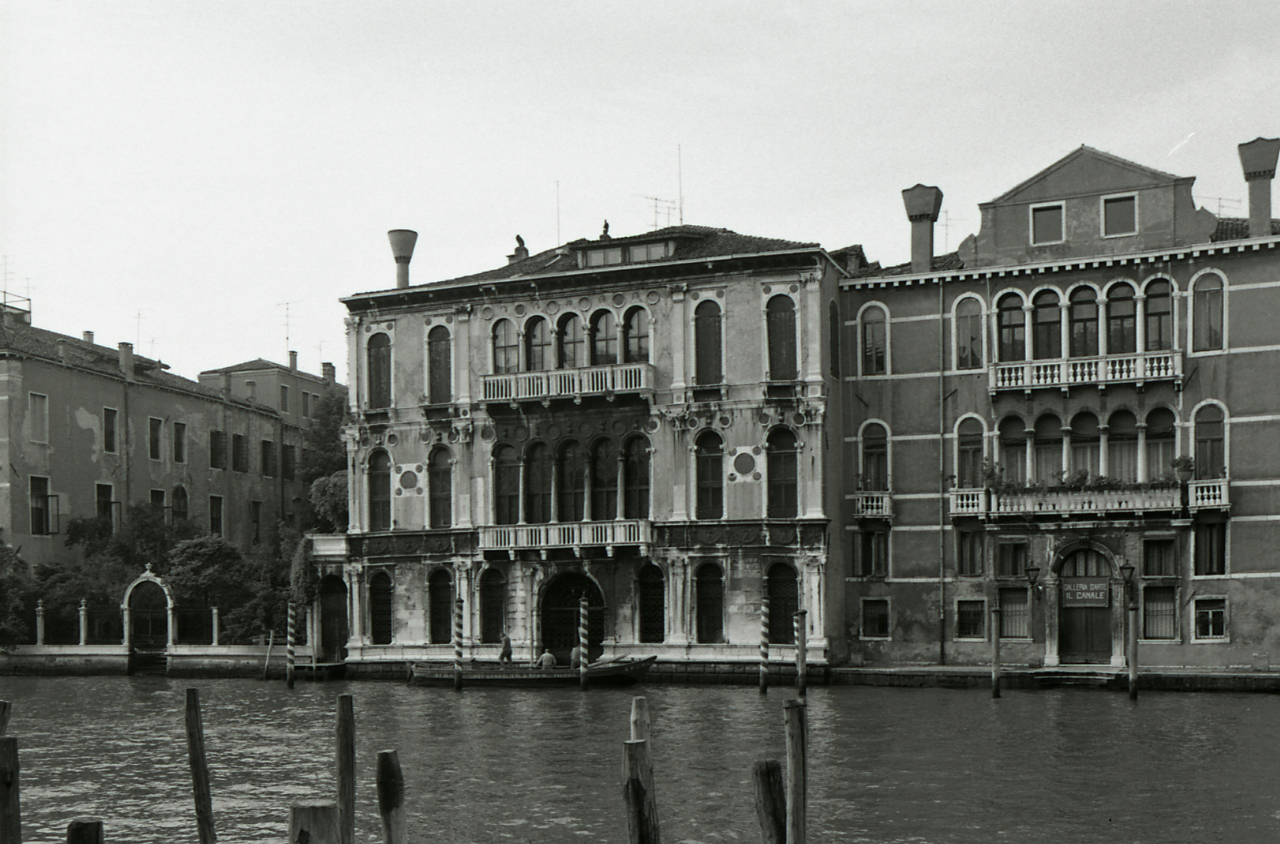
The palace in 1977. A photo by Paolo Monti.
