= Comb honey =

Food consisting of sweet honey still in its wax comb

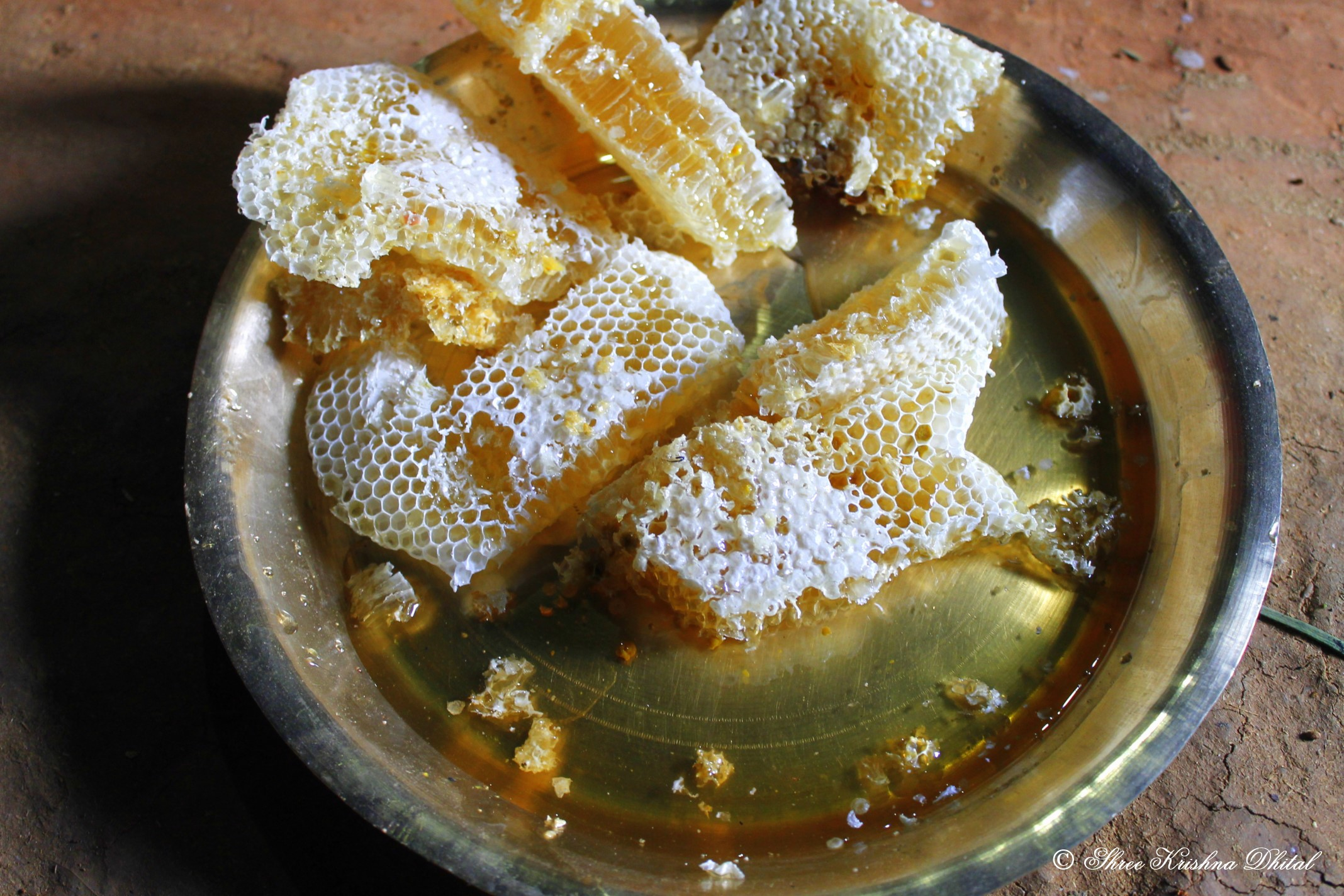
A plate of comb honey

Comb honey is honey intended for consumption by humans, which is still contained within its original hexagonal-shaped beeswax cells, called honeycomb. It has received no processing, filtering, or manipulation, and is in the state that honey bees has produced it.

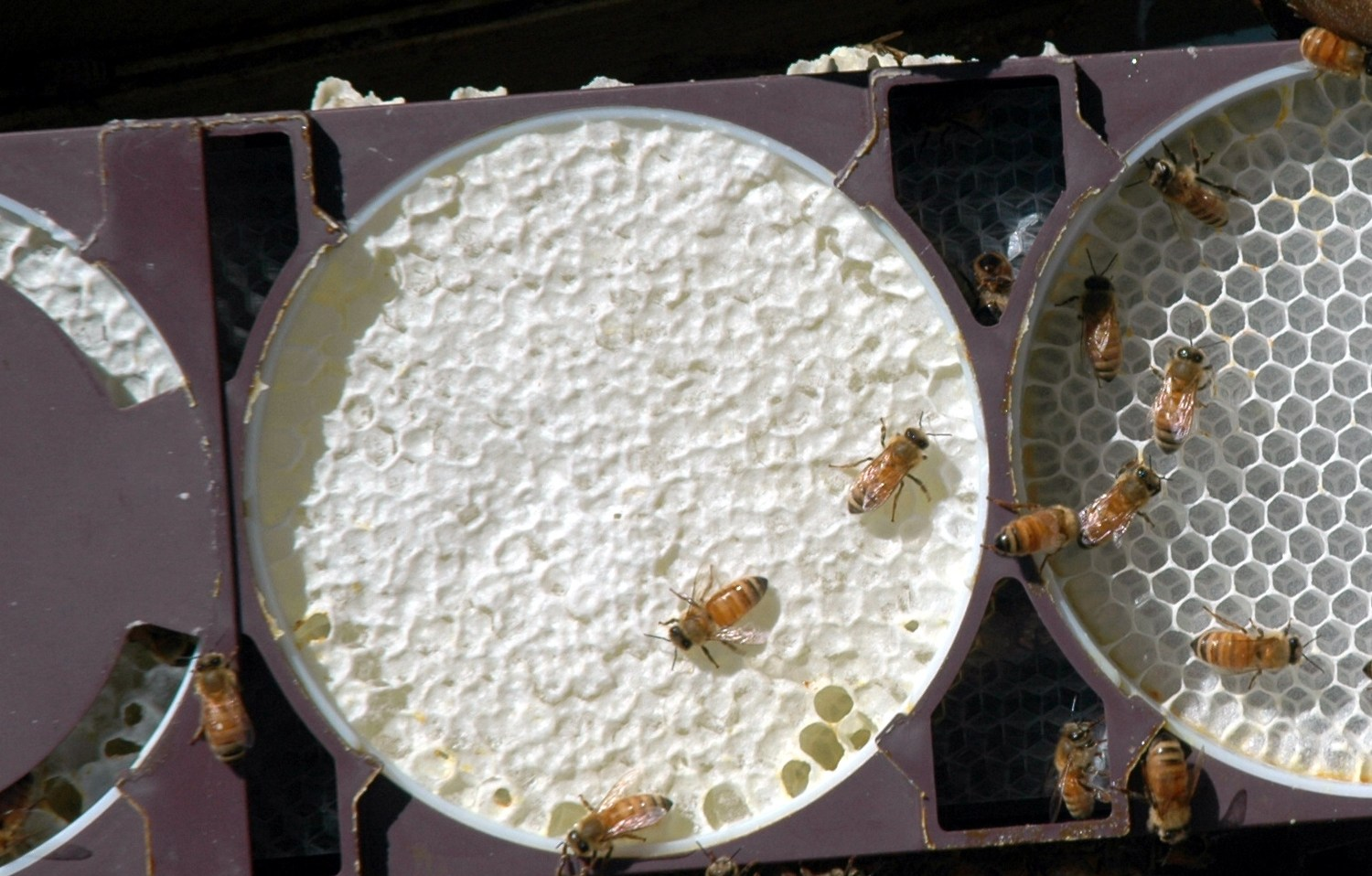
Comb honey production using Ross Round style equipment: center comb is complete, right in progress

Before the invention of the honey extractor almost all honey produced was in the form of comb honey. Today, most honey is produced for extraction but comb honey remains popular among consumers both for eating 'as is' and for combining with extracted honey to make chunk honey. Hobbyists and sideliners can develop their beekeeping skills by producing comb honey, which takes more rigorous attention to beekeeping than the production of extracted honey. Because of the more demanding labor involved, comb honey has greater retail value than extracted honey ($25-$35/pound compared to $10-$18/pound). Comb honey production is more suitable for areas with an intense prolonged honey flow from eucalyptus, alfalfa, alsike, and yellow clover. Wooded areas are not as suitable for comb honey production, as bees tend to collect more propolis, making the harvesting of comb honey more difficult. This problem has been largely circumvented with the adoption of specialized frames, such as the Ross Round frame, which prevents accumulation of propolis on saleable units.

== Hive management ==
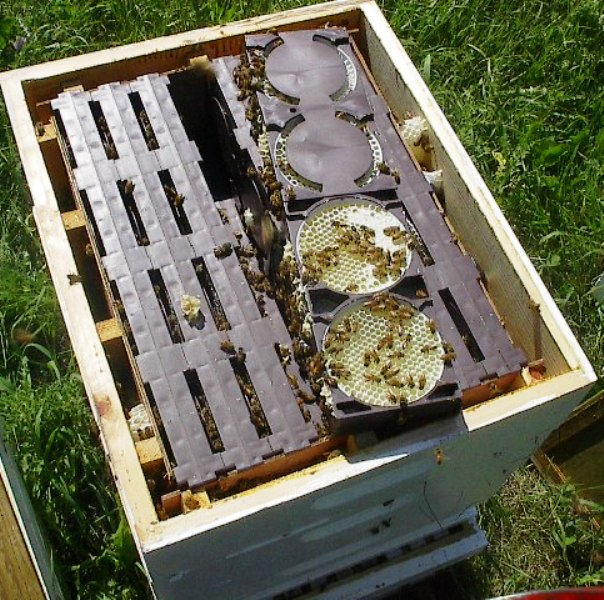
Beehive with Ross Round style comb honey super and frames exposed

Populous honey bee colonies are usually reduced to a single hive body at the beginning of the honey flow when one or more comb honey supers are added. Comb honey can either be produced in wooden sections, shallow frames or Ross Rounds. The successful production of comb honey requires that the hive remain crowded without inducing swarming. Young prolific queens help rapid colony population expansion with less likelihood of swarming. Caucasian honey bees are often preferred for their tendency to keep a constricted brood nest and for their production of white wax cappings, making more attractive honey combs.

== See also ==
- Honey extraction
