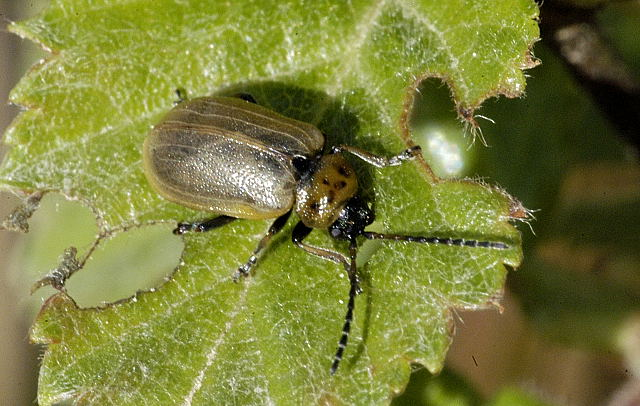

Scientific classification
- Kingdom: Animalia
- Phylum: Arthropoda
- Clade: Pancrustacea
- Class: Insecta
- Order: Coleoptera
- Suborder: Polyphaga
- Infraorder: Cucujiformia
- Family: Chrysomelidae
- Genus: Lochmaea
- Species: L. caprea

Binomial name
- Lochmaea caprea (Linnaeus, 1758)

= Lochmaea caprea =

Species of beetle

Lochmaea caprea is a species of leaf beetle native to Europe.
