= Palazzo Contarini Dal Zaffo =

Building in Venice, Italy

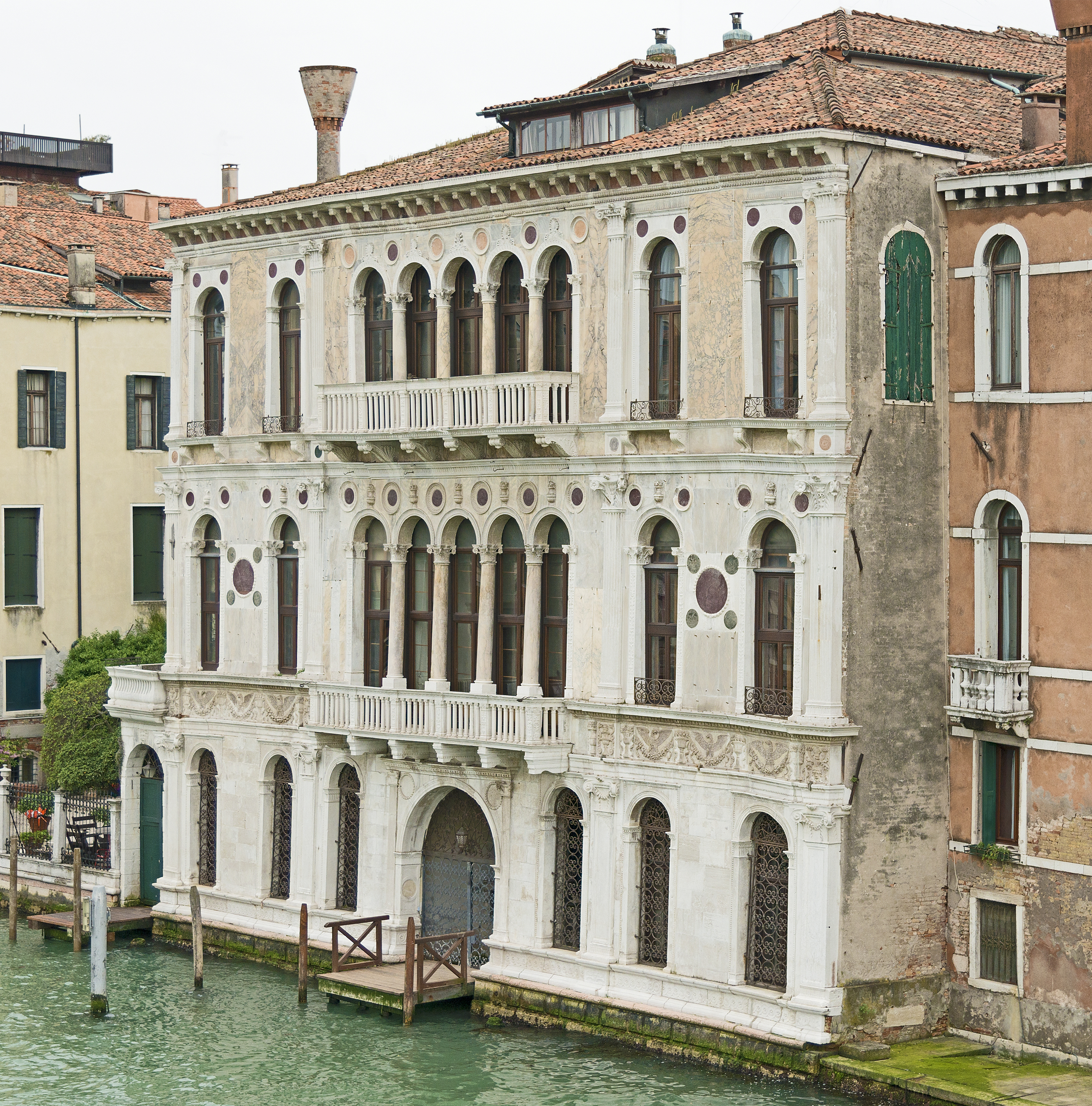
- Palazzo Contarini Polignac, facade on Grand Canal.
- Interactive map of the Palazzo Contarini Dal Zaffo area
- Alternative names: Palazzo Contarini Polignac

General information
- Type: Residential
- Architectural style: Renaissance
- Location: Dorsoduro district, Venice, Italy
- Coordinates: 45°25′52.37″N 12°19′45.57″E
- Construction stopped: 15th century

Technical details
- Floor count: 3

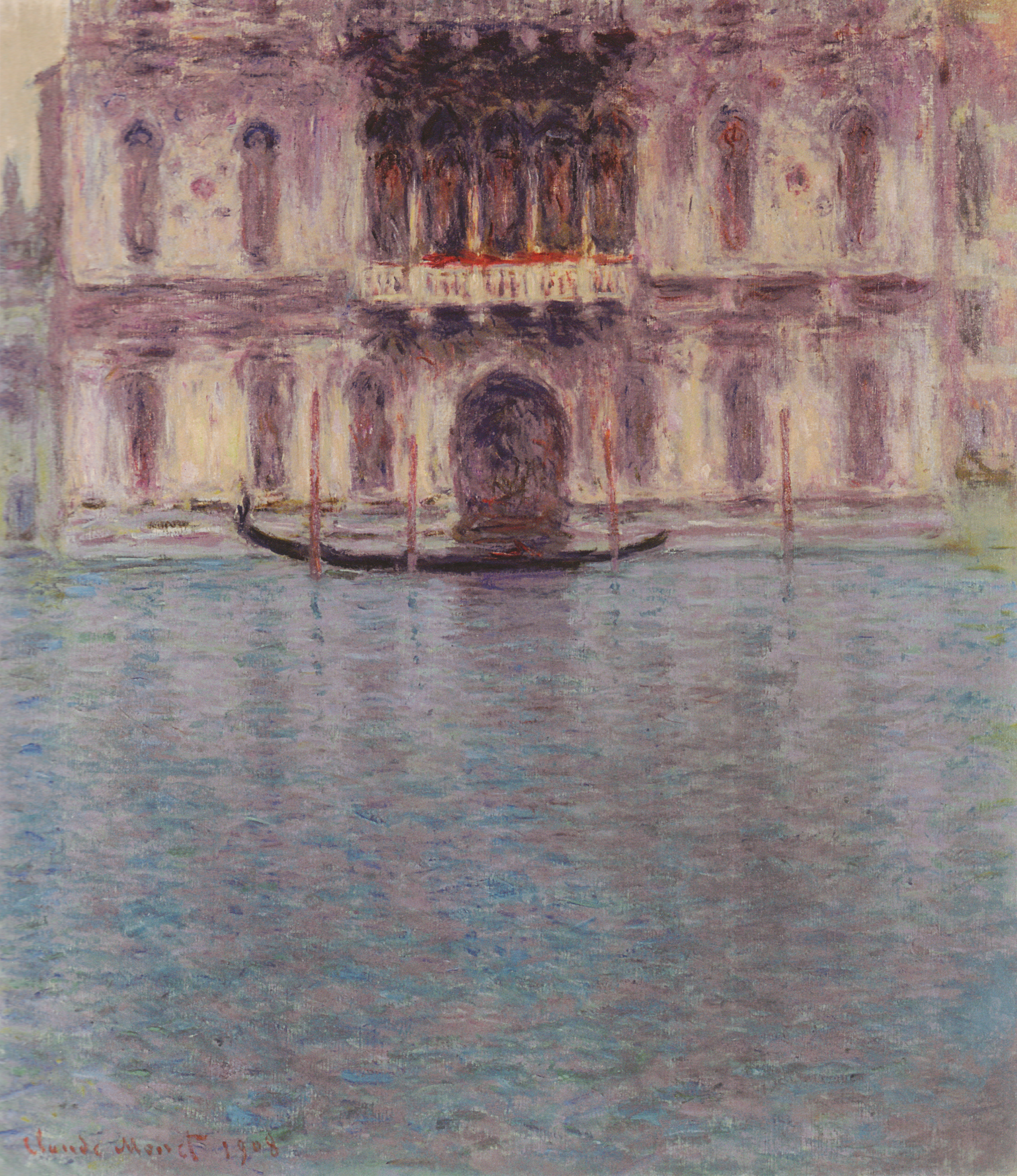
Palazzo Contarini by Claude Monet, 1908.

Palazzo Contarini Dal Zaffo, also known as Palazzo Contarini Polignac, is a large palace in Venice, located in the Dorsoduro district, overlooking the Grand Canal, in an intermediate position between Palazzo Brandolin Rota and Palazzo Balbi Valier.

== Attribution ==
The palazzo was probably built in the second half of the 15th century. The architect of the palazzo is unknown, but the design is frequently attributed to Giovanni Buora, Mauro Codussi, or Pietro Lombardo. The architect was most likely inspired by the Lombard architectural style. Together with Palazzo Dario the building is one of the first examples of Renaissance architecture structures in the city.

== History ==
The Contarini dal Zaffo family, which owned many other famous palazzos, rebuilt the structure between 1562 and 1582 without altering its exterior. The palazzo was named after Giorgio Contarini, who was Count of Jaffa (Zaffo) in Palestine. Since 1758, the building was owned by several wealthy families: first by the Manzoni, then by the Angaran, and then by the Polignac. In 1901, the building was bought by Winaretta Singer, who was the daughter of Isaac Singer and the Princess of Polignac. Because of the Polignac's ownership, the palace bears its double name of Contarini Polignac. When the palazzo was the residence of the Princess of Polignac, it became the site of a great intellectual salon, hosting important personalities in the field of the arts (especially music), like Igor Stravinsky. Today, the palazzo is still a private residence and a property of the Decazes family, direct descendants of Winaretta Singer, Princess of Polignac; it was restored between 2004 and 2007.

During the International Art Exhibitions of the Venice Biennale, the large palazzo is a frequent venue for various art events.

== Architecture ==
The typical Renaissance façade of three levels is entirely covered by polished marble tiles, which give the building its particular beauty and prominence. The palazzo's look appears as a mixture of elements inspired by Byzantine art, Renaissance architecture, and components of Tuscan origin, thus creating a union, which severity and grace were much appreciated even by John Ruskin.

The structure stands on a place of previous Byzantine factory, of which only the shape of the windows and the round decorations that enrich the facade survive. There are two noble floors, both with the same layouts, decorated by pentaforas in the central part flanked by two single-lancet windows on either side. Also present on the ground floor are the openings with round arches, six in total, plus the central portal with direct access to the canal. The right side of the building shares walls with Palazzo Brandolin Rota, while the left side has a beautiful side façade with a three-light window on the second floor and a covered terrace on the first, overlooking a garden open to the Grand Canal and bordering with Palazzo Balbi Valier. On the back side, the building is decorated with another polifora.

The interior contains frescoes by Giandomenico Tiepolo.

== Cultural depictions ==
A painting by Claude Monet dating back to 1908 demonstrates the facade of the building. Monet also painted Ca' Dario and Palazzo Da Mula Morosini.
