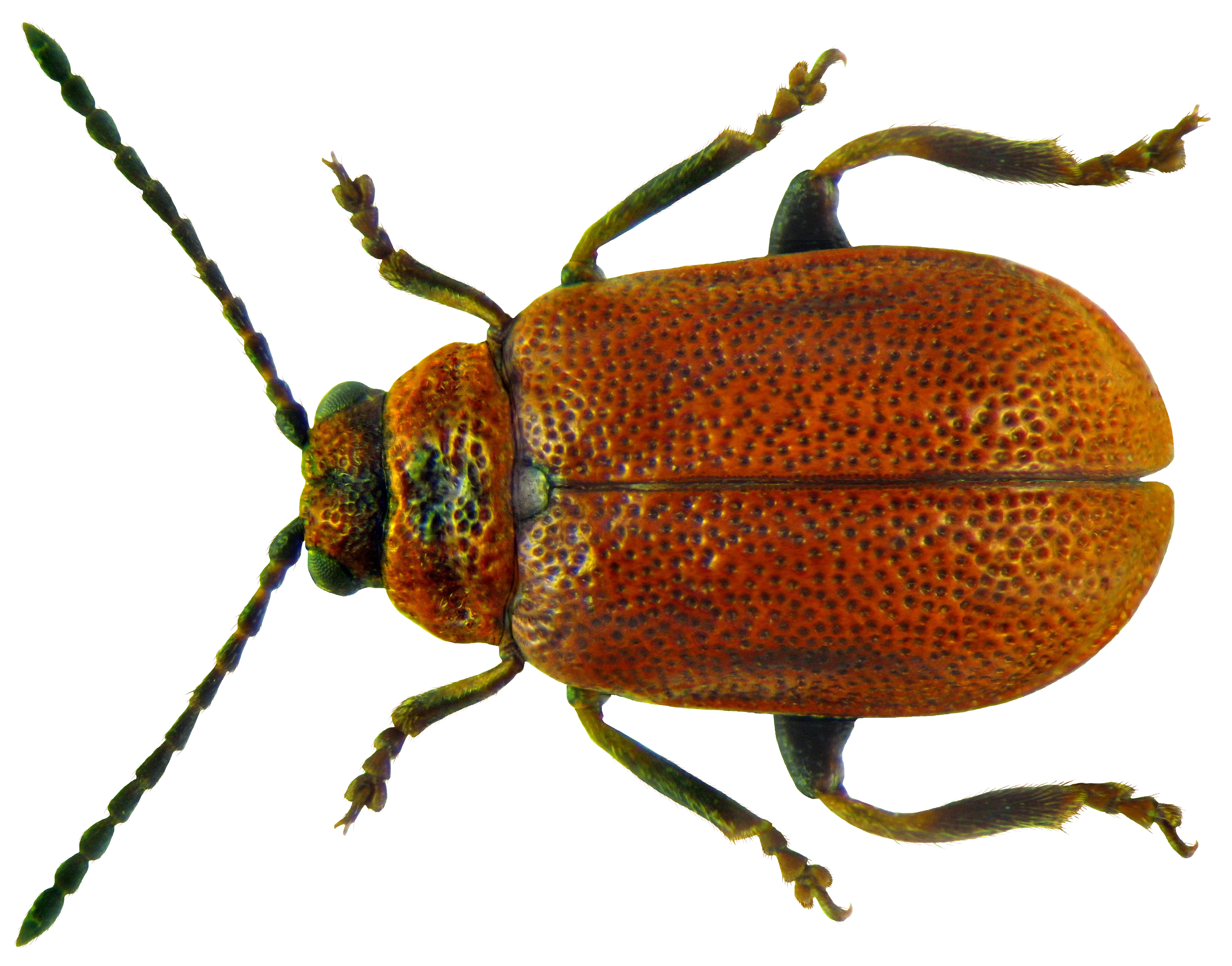

Scientific classification
- Kingdom: Animalia
- Phylum: Arthropoda
- Clade: Pancrustacea
- Class: Insecta
- Order: Coleoptera
- Suborder: Polyphaga
- Infraorder: Cucujiformia
- Family: Chrysomelidae
- Genus: Lochmaea
- Species: L. crataegi

Binomial name
- Lochmaea crataegi (Forster, 1771)

= Lochmaea crataegi =

Species of beetle

Lochmaea crataegi is a species of leaf beetle native to Europe.

Locally distributed throughout England and Wales, less extensively so in southern Scotland. Adults are found on hawthorn (Crataegus) blossom, around Watford it seems exclusively so as beating the earlier flowering blackthorn (Prunus spinosa), among many other types of blossom, over the years has failed to produce the species. Depending on season Crataegus begins to flower during the third week of April when occasionally single Lochmaea are found, numbers increase until the first or second week of may when Crataegus blossom is everywhere and the adults can be beaten in numbers throughout our area. They are active throughout May and are often found alongside Neocoenorrhinus aequatus.
