= Honey extractor =

Device for extracting honey from honey comb

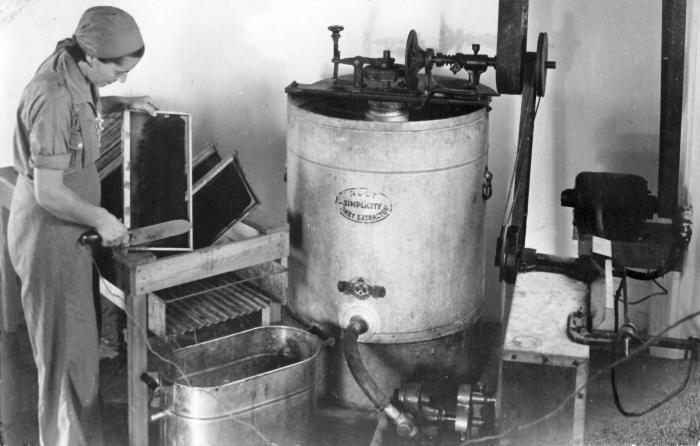
- Uncapping and extracting honey in an Israeli Kibutz in the 1940s
- Classification: Beekeeping
- Types: Tangential; radial
- Inventor: Franz Hruschka
- Manufacturer: Various

A honey extractor is a mechanical device used in extraction of honey from honeycombs. A honey extractor extracts the honey from the honey comb without destroying the comb. Extractors work by centrifugal force. A drum or container holds a frame basket which spins, flinging the honey out. With this method the wax comb stays intact within the frame and can be reused by the bees.

Bees cover the filled cells with a wax cap that must be removed (cut by knife, etc.) before centrifugation.

== History ==
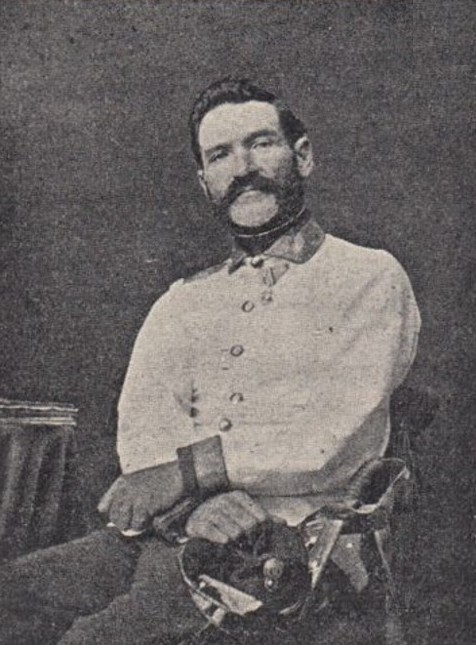
Franz Hruschka in uniform

In 1838, Johann Dzierzon, a Polish Roman Catholic priest and beekeeper devised the first practical movable-comb beehive, allowing for the manipulation of individual honeycombs without destroying the structure of the hive. This idea was further developed by L. L. Langstroth, an American pastor and beekeeper in Philadelphia, Pennsylvania, who patented his beehive design in 1852. These frames were a major improvement over the old method of beekeeping using hollowed tree trunks and skeps. However, no method had been found to easily extract the honey.

The extractor was invented in the summer of 1865, by Franz Hruschka, a former Officer in the Austrian Army who was by then a beekeeper in Italy. The exact date of the invention is not known but on July 1, 1865, he explained in an article in the Eichstraett Beekeeping News his old crushing method to extract honey. This article would have been written in May or June of that year. In September 1865, he makes the announcement at the Brno Beekeeper Conference of his new invention: the centrifuge extractor. The first model was built by Bollinger Manufacturer in Vienna, Austria.

The first version was a simple tin box attached to a wire cord with a funnel at the bottom to which a glass was fastened to collect the honey. The extraction was however slow and required a lot of effort from the beekeeper. The second version used the same design but attached to an arm at the top of a tripod. The final version resembled what we recognize today as an extractor with the familiar round tub.

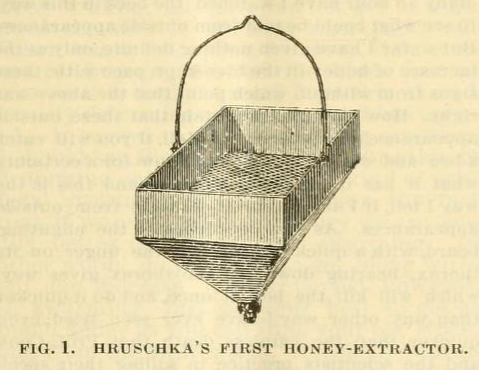
De Hruschka Extractor (first version)

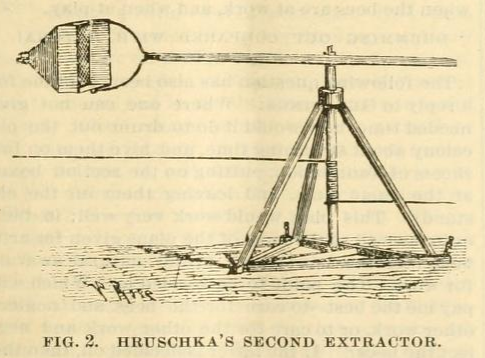
De Hruschka Extractor (second version)

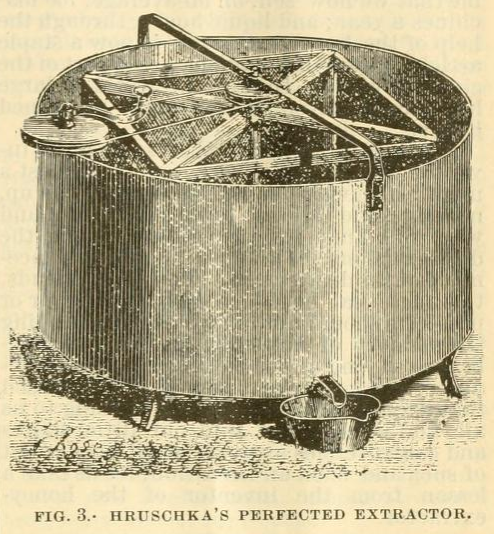
De Hruschka Extractor (final version)

Scale models of the three versions of the extractors were presented in August 1868 at the Exposition des Insectes (the Insect Exposition) in Paris, France. The idea was soon published in several beekeeping newspapers worldwide and extractors were manufactured by several vendors and sold worldwide based on his idea.

== Types of extractors ==
Extractors can be one of two kinds depending on how the frames are oriented in the basket:

- tangential: one side of the comb facing outward
- radial: the top bar of the frame facing outward

Both rely on the use of centrifugal force to force the honey out of the cells. During the extraction process the honey is forced out of the uncapped wax cells, runs down the walls of the extractor and pools at the bottom. A tap or honey pump allows for the removal of honey from the extractor. Honey must be removed in time and always stay below the rotating frames as otherwise it prevents extractor from spinning with sufficient speed.

Extractors can vary in sizes from holding just a couple of frames to large commercial ones holding up to sixty frames. The smaller ones can be powered manually while others (especially the commercial ones) will be powered by an electric motor. Most hand-cranked extractors will rely on a gearing system to increase the speed of the rotation of the frames.

Most large commercial extractors are radial and rely on the upward slope of the comb cells. When bees build their comb, the cells are sloped upward from the centre rib at an angle of 10 to 14 degrees. By leveraging this slope angle, it is easier to extract the honey. In addition, the amount of work during extraction is reduced in the radial type because the frames do not have to be turned over to extract the honey from the other side of the comb (however some extractors are capable of turning combs automatically).

Some portable honey extractors are driven by petrol or diesel small engines. Larger diesel engines are more expensive than compact 2 stroke petrol ones and usually operate at lower rpms with higher torque. Diesel-powered extractors are harder to start, especially in the winter due to increased fuel viscosity in colder conditions.

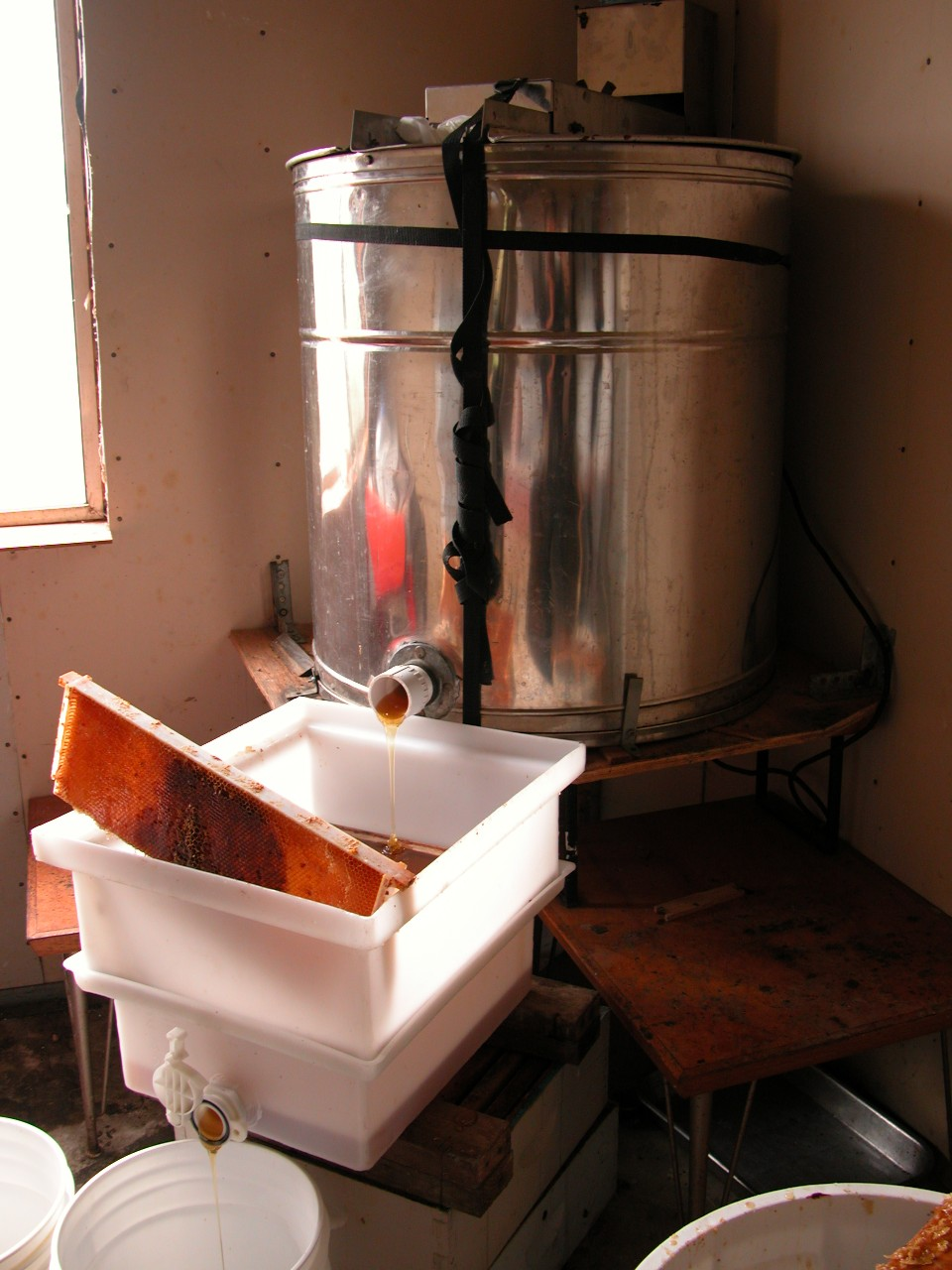
A twenty-frame honey extractor in operation

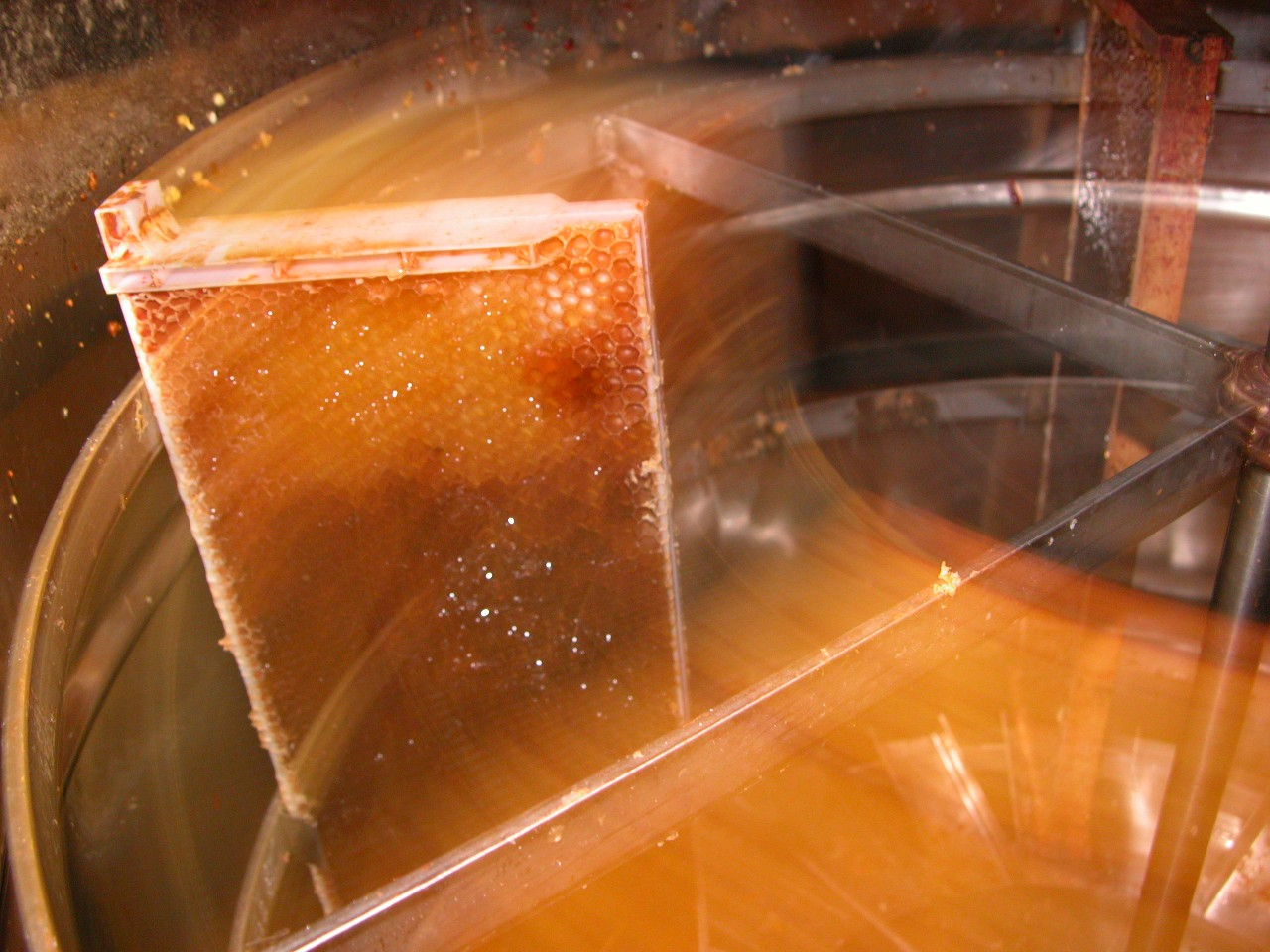
A twenty-frame extractor loaded with four frames, turning

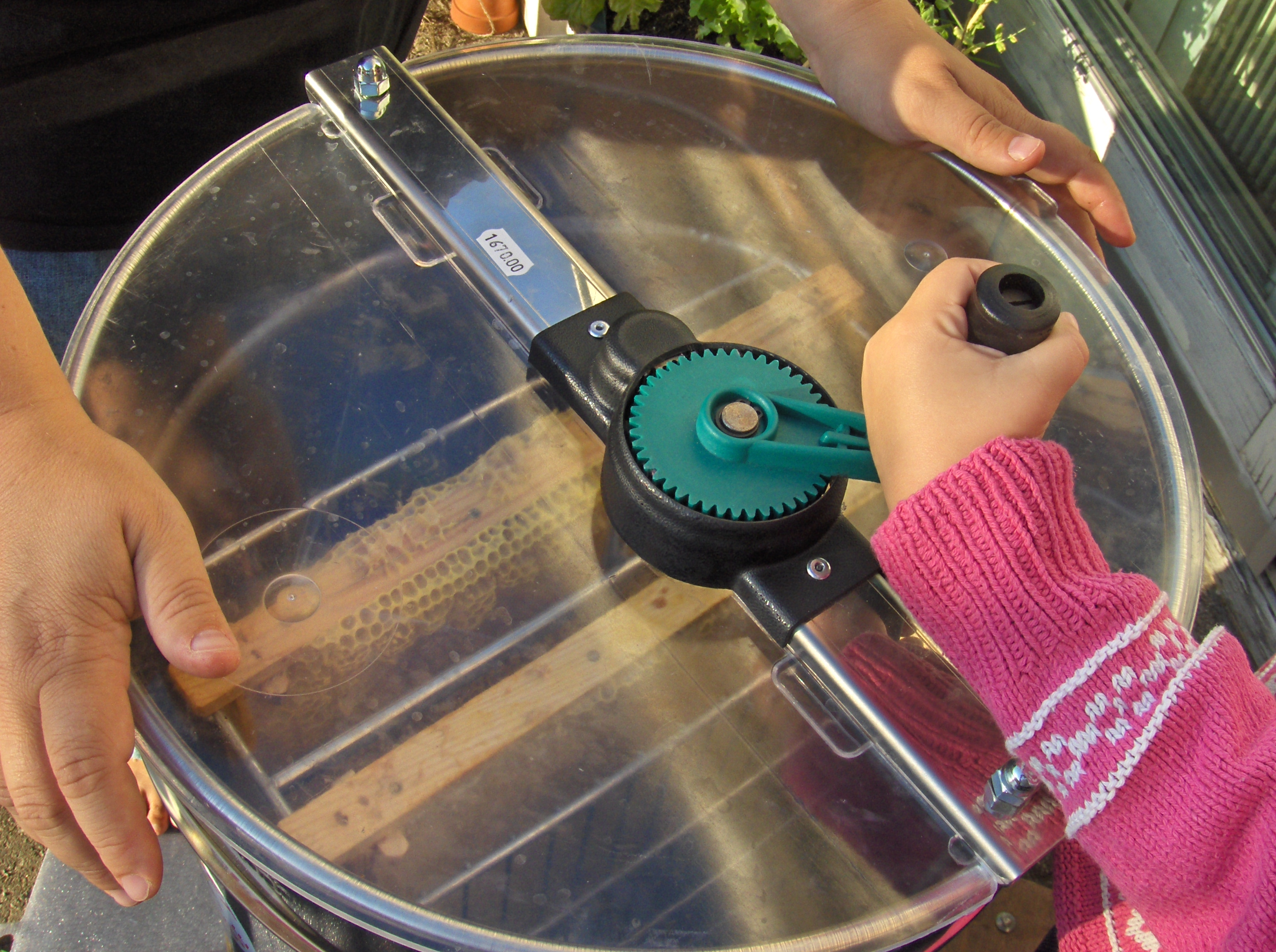
Manual extractor

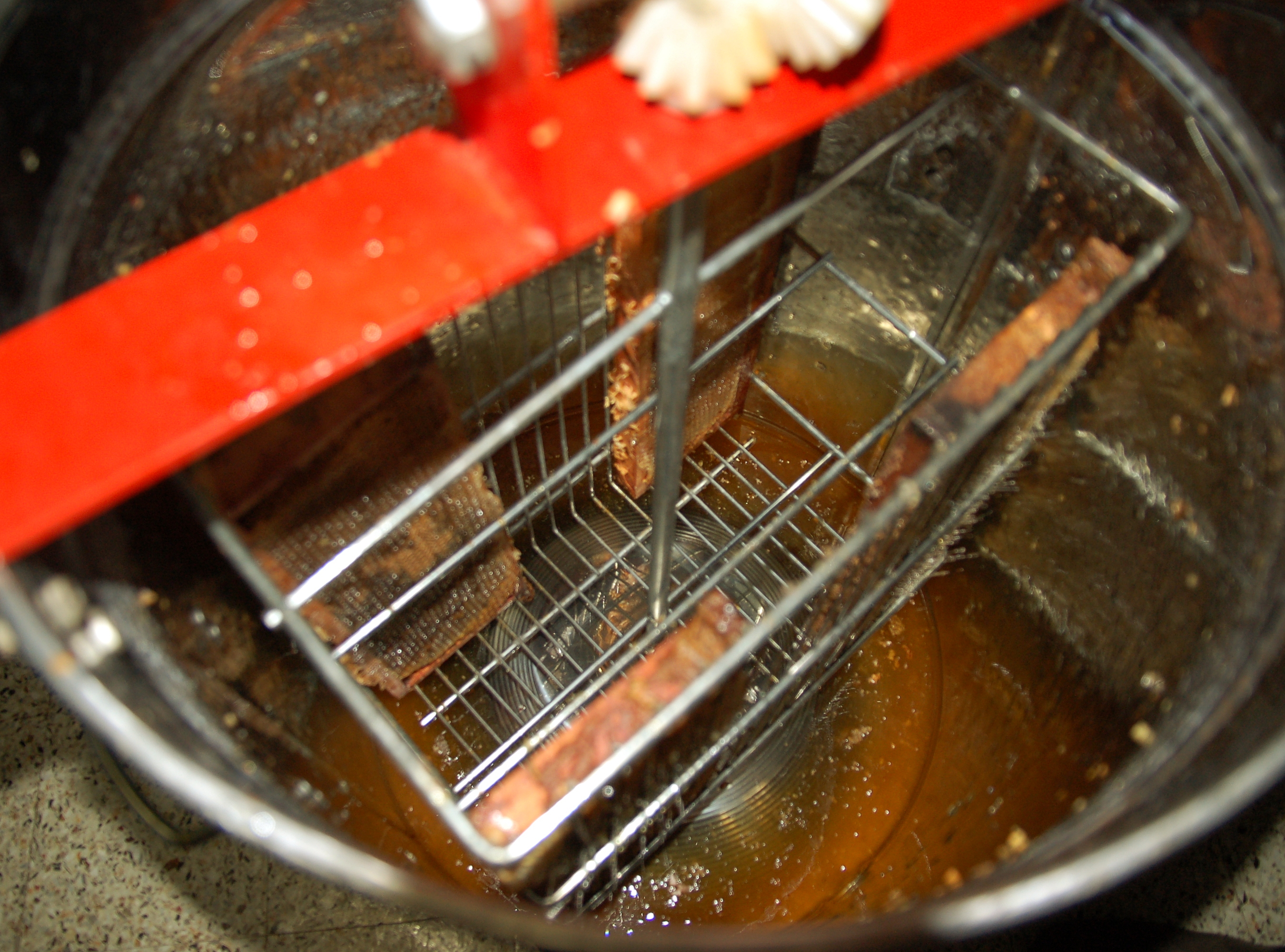
Inside view of a manual extractor

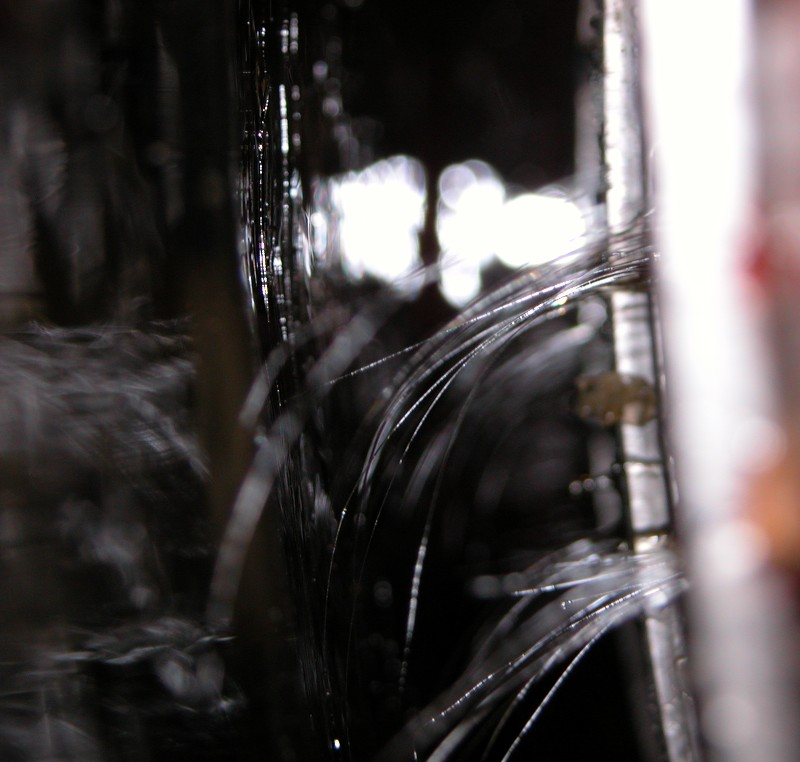
Honey being flung off a frame by centrifugal force inside an extractor during operation

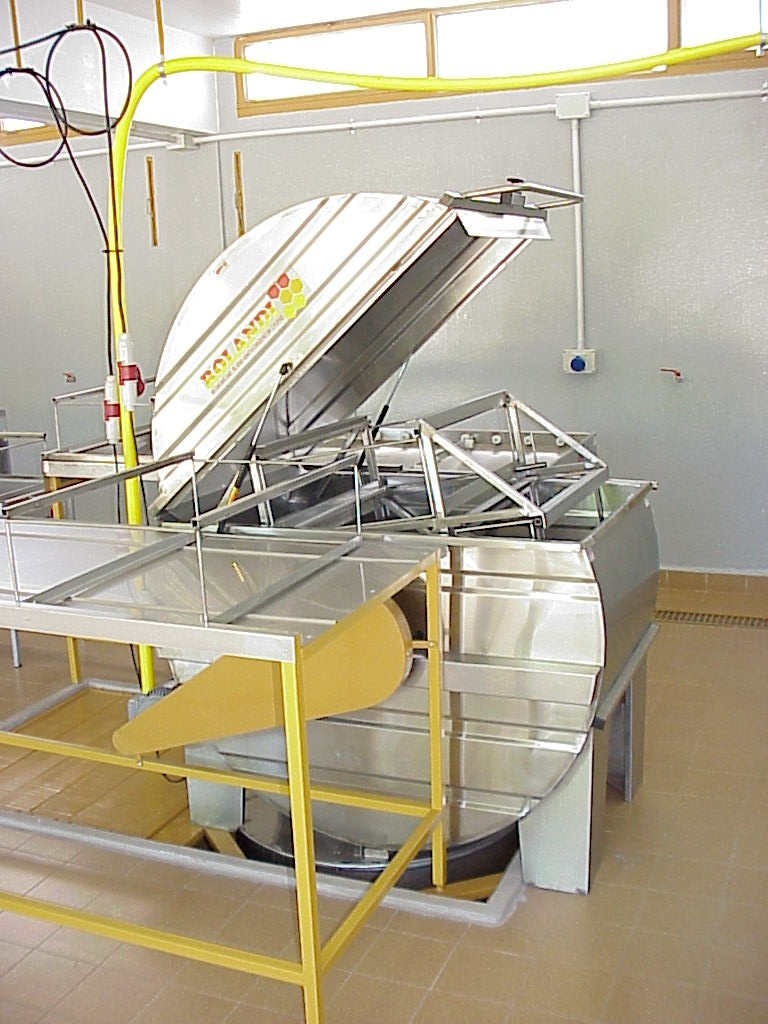
Industrial extractor

== Alternative methods ==
An extractor is not essential to get the honey out of comb. Alternative methods include:

- Cut Comb: the comb is cut into round or square pieces and used as is.
- Crush and Strain: the comb is cut out, crushed in a container and then strained through cheesecloth or another filtering system to separate the honey from the wax.
- Chunk Honey: this is a hybrid between the two: the comb is cut and put in a container and then the rest of the space is filled with honey extracted by another method.
- Flow Hive is a beehive brand that has a unique honey frame designed to allow honey extraction without needing to open the beehive.

== See also ==
- Hive frame
- Francesco De Hruschka
