= Flow Hive =

Australian beehive brand

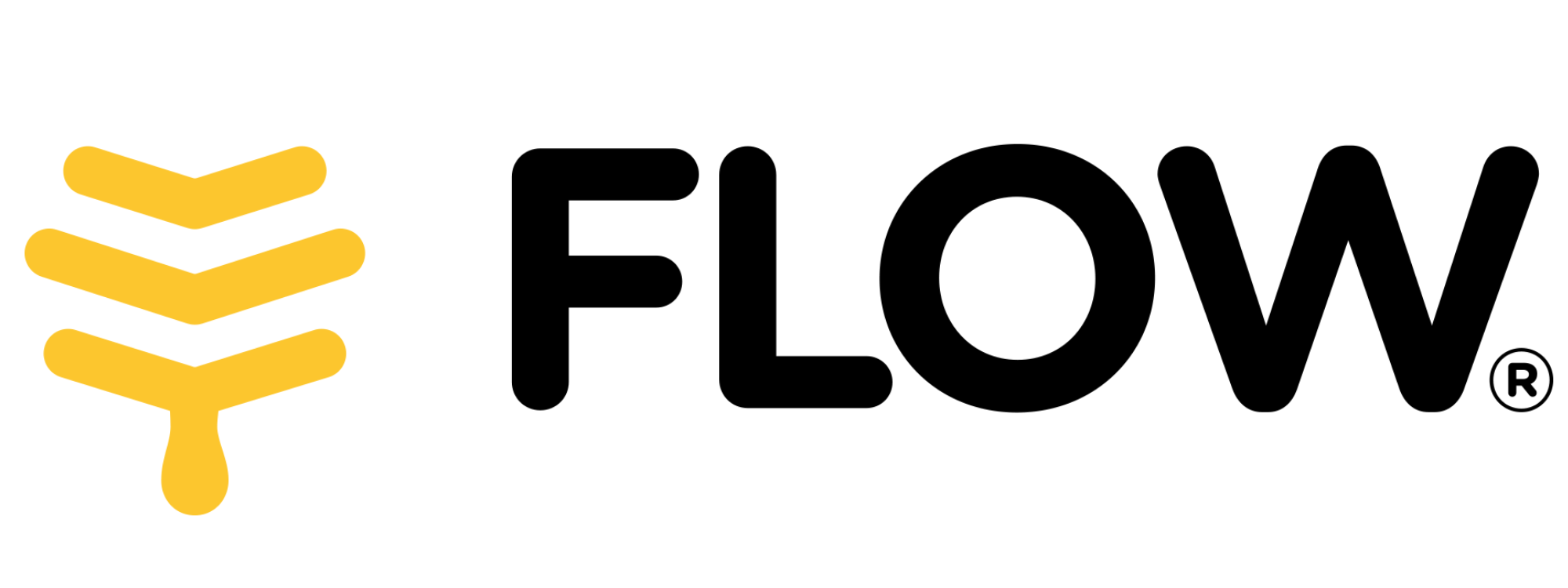
- Product type: Beehive with unique honey frame
- Country: Australia
- Introduced: 2015; 11 years ago
- Type: Privately held company
- Industry: Beekeeping
- Founded: 2015; 11 years ago in Byron Bay, Australia
- Headquarters: Byron Bay, Australia
- Area served: Worldwide
- Key people: Cedar Anderson; Stuart Anderson
- Products: Flow Hive
- Brands: Flow Hive; Flow; Flow Frames
- Parent: BeeInventive Pty Ltd
- Website: www.honeyflow.com.au

Flow Hive is a brand of beehive with a unique honey frame, which allows honey extraction without opening the beehive. During extraction, bees are visibly disturbed less than by other methods. The new frame is marketed as a technology to revolutionize the harvesting of honey.

== Design ==
Schematic with inset at top-right showing the way cells in the honey frame offset during honey extraction to allow honey to flow down for collection

Based on an earlier design from 1939, Flow Hive uses honey frames containing a partially-formed honeycomb with vertical gaps that is made of a plastic free of both BPA and BPS. These honey frames are for use in the Langstroth hive compartment, commonly called the honey super, which is intended for honey storage by bees. Bees fill these vertical gaps with wax to complete cells and then fill them with honey before covering them with wax. When the beekeeper activates the frame mechanism by inserting and turning a crank, the vertical gaps are offset by one-half of a cell. This breaks the wax covering and allows the honey to flow through the cells into a channel at the base of each frame and out into a collection vessel, obviating the need for extraction equipment such as centrifuges and filters. After the beekeeper resets the frame, the bees remove the broken covering and repair and refill the cells.

Flow Hive honey frames comprise more plastic and plastic surfaces than the plastic foundations used commonly in conventional modern beekeeping. The brood chamber in the Flow Hive below the honey super may contain hive frames intended for bees to make brood comb entirely from their wax.

Patents for the Flow Hive cover all designs with split cells to drain honey. A Chinese company called TapComb that infringed on these patents ceased trading in late 2018.

== Crowdfunding ==
The Flow Hive design was invented in Australia by Cedar Anderson and his father Stuart Anderson. In February 2015, they launched a campaign on crowdfunding platform Indiegogo hoping to raise A$70,000 for a custom injection mould. Instead, they raised over $12 million and received nearly 25,000 orders from over 130 countries. The campaign broke several records for Indiegogo, becoming its most successful campaign as of that time.

The Flow Hive 2, which includes a number of small improvements, was launched using another crowdfunding campaign in early 2018.

== Reception ==
In Australia, a rapid increase in new members joining existing beekeeping clubs in 2017, the capping of new memberships by some clubs, and the establishment of at least one new club were attributed to the Flow Hive. While many new beekeepers have entered the field thanks to the Flow Hive, many people in the market find the new hive to be price inhibitive.

In the first advertisements for the Flow Hive, it was marketed as a way to remove honey "without disturbing the bees". Many experienced beekeepers said that this misrepresented the importance of hive maintenance. Bee hives require regular maintenance and observation to check for diseases and other problems that might arise. Bees also require floral resources near the hive that most urban ecosystems lack where many new beekeepers are opening hives. Many experienced beekeepers worry that well-intentioned amateurs will fail to consider this issue. Cedar Anderson responded to the criticism, changing the way that the Flow Hive was marketed, and specifying that the Flow Hive system only changes the honey harvesting process, while not changing the rest of the beekeeping process.

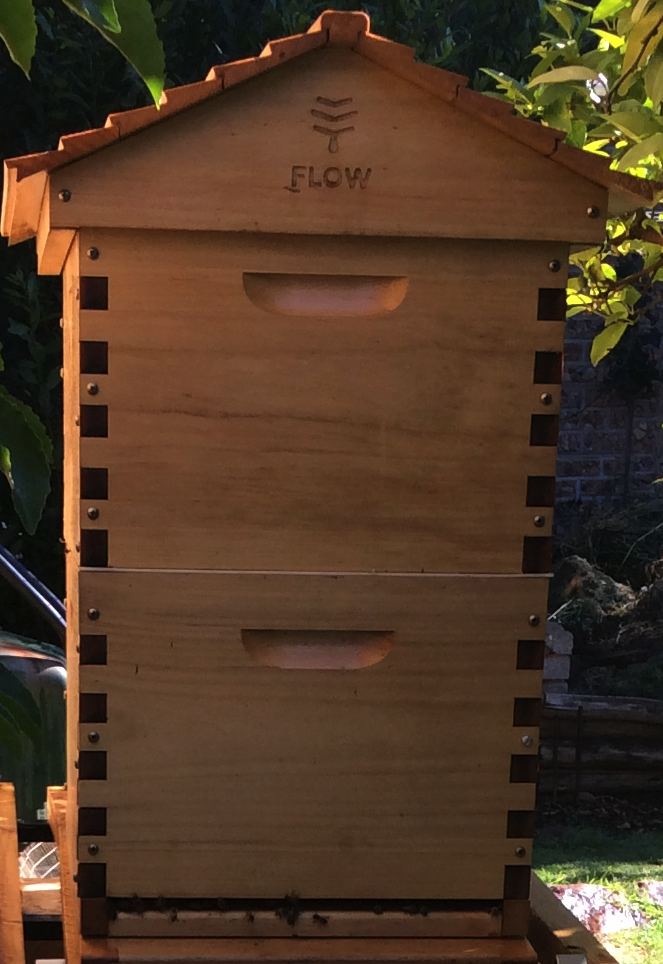
Flow Hive with brood box and characteristic sloped roof

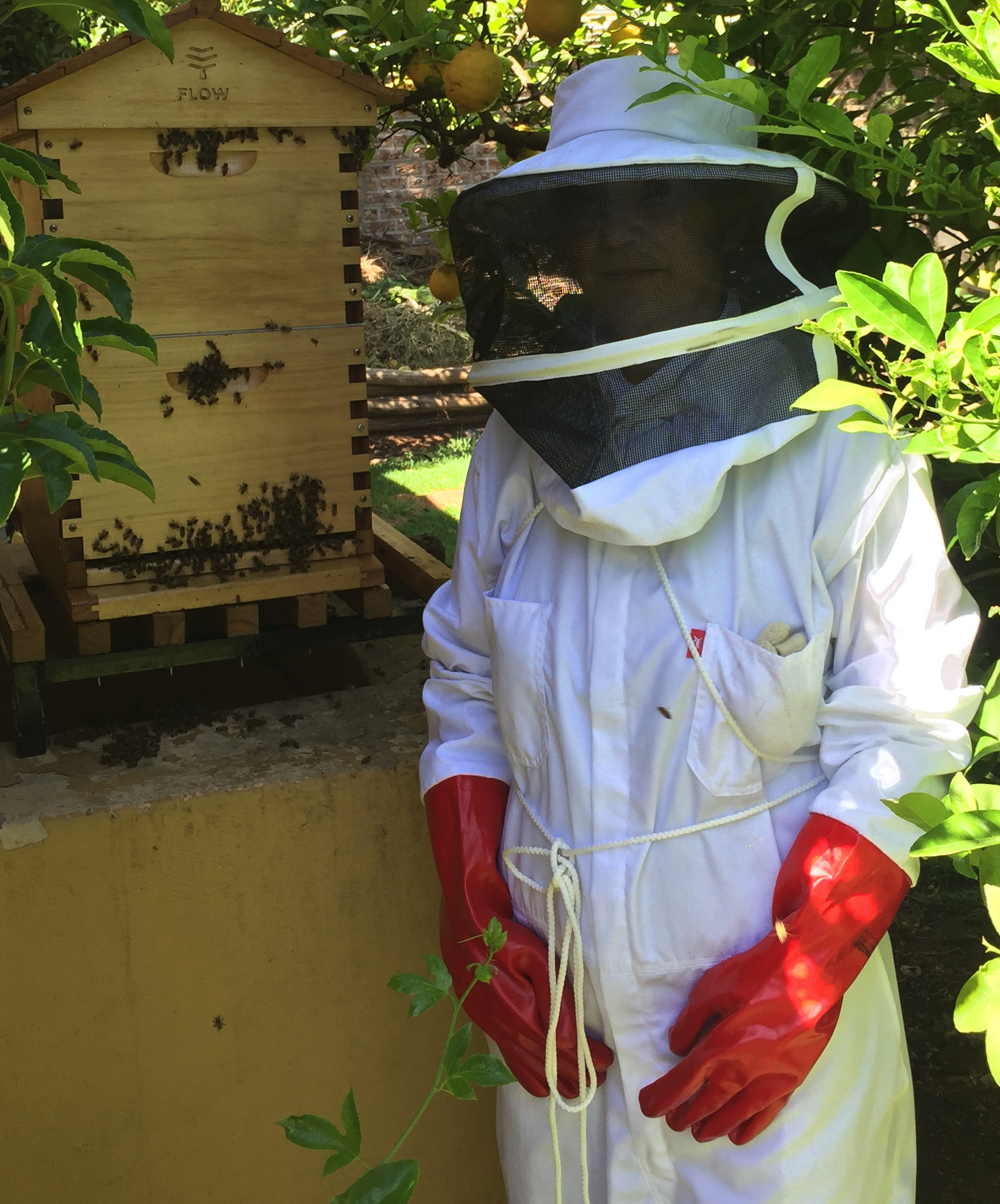
Beekeeper next to a Flow Hive

== Effects ==
A study comparing Langstroth hives to the Flow Hive has found no significant differences in the microbial populations of bees' bodies in these hives.

== See also ==
- Langstroth hive
- Food contact materials
