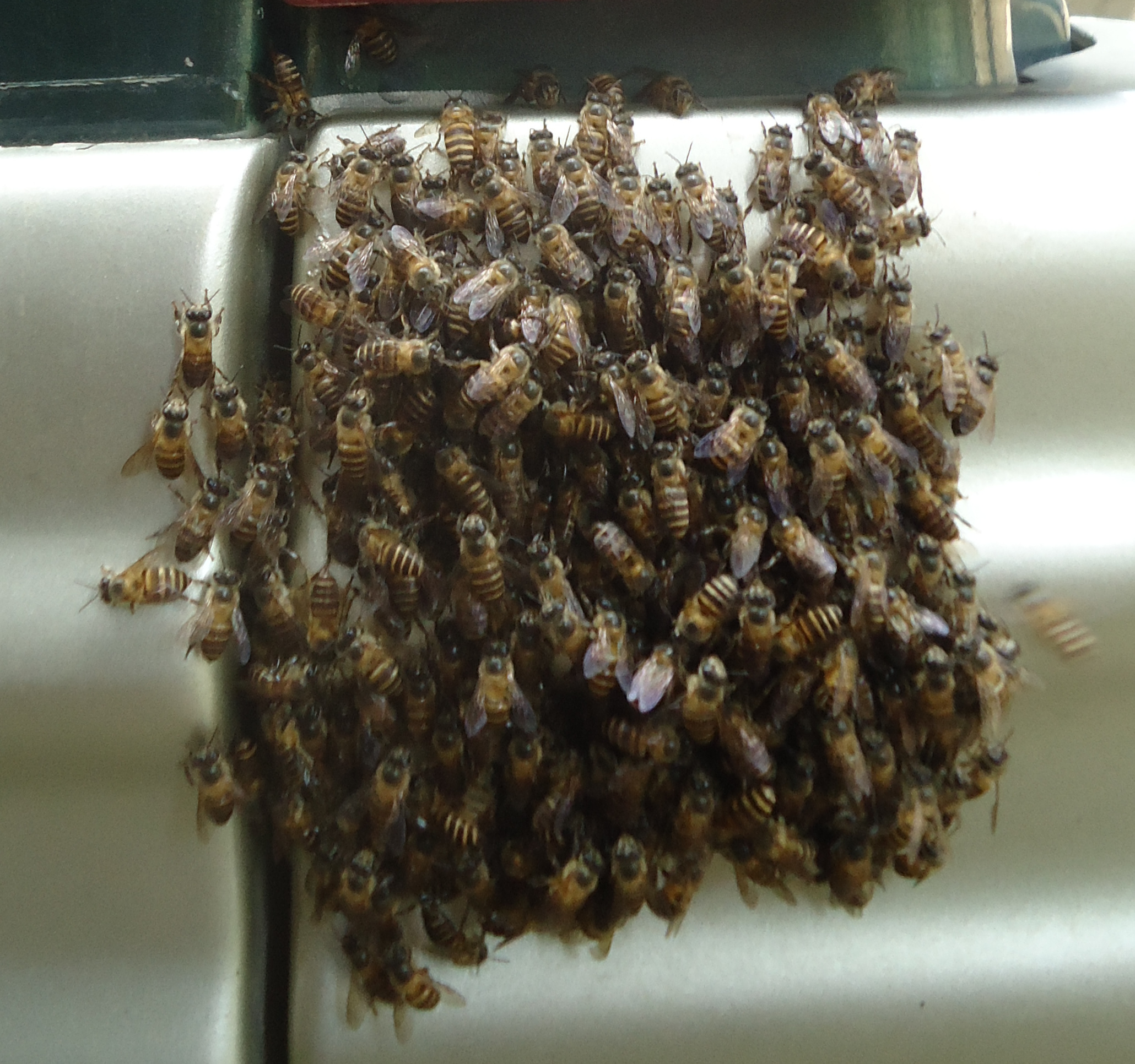
- Swarming behavior in Apis nigrocincta in Bukidnon, Mindanao, Philippines

Scientific classification
- Kingdom: Animalia
- Phylum: Arthropoda
- Class: Insecta
- Order: Hymenoptera
- Family: Apidae
- Genus: Apis
- Species: A. nigrocincta

Binomial name
- Apis nigrocincta F. Smith, 1861
- Range of Apis nigrocincta

= Apis nigrocincta =

Species of bee

Apis nigrocincta is a species of honey bee that inhabits the Philippine island of Mindanao as well as the Indonesian islands of Sangihe and Sulawesi. The species is known to have queens with the highest mating frequencies of any species of the tribe Apini.

It is a middle-sized species of the tribe Apini, compared to the larger A. dorsata or smaller A. florea.

== Taxonomy and phylogeny ==
Apis nigrocincta is part of the subfamily Apinae within the Hymenopteran family Apidae. Apidae is the largest family of bees consisting of over 5,600 species, with the only bees that are raised by humans for honey production.

The subfamily Apinae includes a majority of the honey bee species, with 19 tribes; A. nigrocincta is part of Apini. Unlike the stingless honeybees of genus Meliponini, A. nigrocincta is part of the genus Apis of true honeybees. The genus Apis is split into three major lineages – dwarf, giant, and cavity-nesting honeybees. Apis nigrocincta is a cavity-nesting species and is most related to Apis cerana, Apis koschevnikovi, and Apis cerana nuluensis.

== Description and appearance ==
The bees have a hind wing length ranging anywhere from 5.5 mm to 5.9 mm, and a hind wing width within the range of 1.35 mm to 1.5 mm. The bees have rust-colored scapes, legs, and cylpeuses, with reddish-tan hair color that covers most of the body.

Apis nigrocincta has a proboscis characteristic to those of the genus Apis. The proboscis is characterized by a tube around the glossa formed by the flat galae and basal segments of the labial palpi. Liquids are brought to the mouth through the tube by a back and forth movement of the glossa, capillary action, and suction through the mouth. The proboscis is stored in a large groove on the underside of the head, known as the proboscidial fossa, when not in use. Pollen is carried by scopal hairs on the underside of the abdomen or on the hind legs. Teeth and carinae are not present in the mandibles of workers. In females, the claws are cleft and areola are present. The hind tibia and flabellum are similar to the genus Bombus.

=== Reproductive structure and function ===
In queens, the ovariole count can range from 150 to 180 per ovary, and that number is much smaller in workers, although variable. In males, the genitalia are greatly reduced compared to other Hymenoptera, but replaced by ornate endophalluses. Within the species of Apis, there is very little differentiation in male genitalia of Apis. However, there is a striking variance in male endophalli for A. nigrocincta, and an explanation could be due to the female choice hypothesis, in that variability in male structure can be attributed to the fact that females choose their mates.

== Distribution and habitat ==
There is little known about the biogeography of the species, only that it is found in parts of Indonesia and the Philippines. A. nigrocincta is suggested to have been derived from China, as it shares similar morphologies with A. cerana from the mainland than with A. cerana from the southwest. It is also stipulated that a proto-nigrocincta may have come from Borneo during the Quaternary glaciation. On the southern part of the Indonesian island of Sulawesi, most colonies are found above 400 m elevation, unlike its cousin A. cerana, of which most colonies are found below 400 m elevation. However, in areas without A. cerana, A. nigrocincta can be found in low elevation as well. In addition, A. nigrocincta inhabit areas that are more forested or mixed-culture areas, in either natural or man-made cavities near streams. In central Sulawesi, A. nigrocincta is only found at elevation levels of 550 m or higher. The areas with a higher density of A. nigrocincta have shorter, less defined dry periods but more pronounced wet periods. Finally, where A. cerana and A. nigrocincta coexist, competition will influence the location of either species.

=== Nest structure ===
A. nigrocincta is a medium-sized cavity-nesting species. Colonies are “permanent” and new colonies are formed by fission. Multiple combs are found in dark cavities such as hollows of trunks of live or dead trees, underneath roofs, water jars, and caves. Combs are also built with multiple attachment sites so that the contents of the nest are spread out over several points of contact. These nesting sites are close to the ground, usually 4–5 m in distance. Multiple combs are built in a pattern in which there is a uniform distance, known as the bee space, between each comb. There are two types of combs in a brood: smaller ones for workers and larger ones for drones, with worker cells averaging around 4.5 mm. Queen cells can be found on the lower edges of the combs, while honey is stored in the upper as well as the outer part of the combs.

== Colony cycle ==
Little has been observed concerning the colony cycle of A. nigrocincta. Colony reproduction occurs when an old queen bee leaves the nest with a large number of worker bees after communicating with a dancing scout. These dances will indicate final destinations that range anywhere from 140 to 1,920 m, although scouts will travel anywhere from 75 to 2,340 m, distance much further than A. cerana. A rapid expansion of the nest will occur, and brood rearing will occur.

== Kin selection ==
=== Queen ===
A colony will have anywhere from 7 to 15 queens per colony. Virgin queens that emerge from the queen cells of A. nigrocincta will be accepted by other species, but A. nigrocincta will not accept alien queens when queens of the same species are present, although there is no evidence that alien queens mate with A. nigrocincta drones. When a mother queen leaves the nest in a prime swarm, the first emerged queen will start “piping” by pressing her thorax on the surface of the comb and vibrating, causing a piping sound. Her fully developed sisters will also vibrate their thoraxes, creating a “tooting” sound. As long as these sounds continue, the younger queens will remain in their cells. Only after the next swarm will the next queen emerge and start the cycle of “piping” and “tooting.” If there are not enough workers to form a swarm, young queens will fight to the death until there is only one queen left.

== Behavior ==
=== Migration ===
Similar to virtually all other Asian honeybee species, A. nigrocincta will abandon a nest to start a new one through migration and absconding. Due to the tropical climate of Southeast Asia, conditions for migration and absconding are possible year round, though predation pressure is severe in many areas. Colonies will leave due to disastrous events of nature or situations where abandonment is necessary, or due to reduced resources. In addition, one can predict colony migrations due to seasonal declines in pollen or extreme temperature.

=== Waggle dance ===
The waggle dance of A. nigrocincta shares similarities with waggle dances of other cavity-nesting Asian honeybees. The dance will be performed on a vertical plane in an enclosed nest cavity near the entrance in the darkness of the cavity. During the straight portion of the dance, the location of a resource is based on its position relative to the sun, while during the angle portion, the angle relative to the vertical represents the angle of the food source relative to the sun. The dance tempo is slower than that of A. cerana.

=== Mating ===
Drones will congregate to specific sites known as drone congregation areas, and queens will mate at these sites when she is out on her mating flight. When a queen encounters a drone, she can choose to exercise choice of mates before mating, although there is currently no evidence of this preferential treatment. A drone will then hold on to a queen and turn his endophallus inside out into the opened sting chamber of the queen. This then will paralyze him, the distal part of his genitalia will break off, and the sting chamber will be filled with sperm. The queen will then return from her mating flight with a mating sign that protrudes from the sting chamber

==== Mating frequency ====
Apis nigrocincta queens mate with a relatively high number of males compared to queens of other bee species, with observed numbers of different matings ranging from 42 to 69 drones per queen. The mating frequency is the highest documented for honeybees, aside from Apis dorsata, Apis laboriosa, and Apis cerana nuluensis, the only Apis species that do not have documented paternity frequencies. Similar to other Apis species, A. nigrocincta have monogynous colonies with queens mating with a large number of males.

=== Defense ===
The primary measure of defense for A. nigrocincta is to live in cavities, as the cavities restrict accessibility of resources to a predator, but allow possession of valuable and limited resources to the bees themselves. Entrances to these cavities are guarded and check incoming traffic for any intruders. Another act of defense is “body shaking,” a violent and pendulum like swaying of the abdomen, performed by worker bees to discourage any insects, especially wasps, from invading the nest.

== Differences between Apis cerana and Apis nigrocincta ==
Apis nigrocincta has been mistaken for the species A. cerana, as the two species live in similar areas and can be confused for each other in their behavior and to a certain extent, appearance. In areas where A. cerana and A. nigrocincta live together, they can most immediately be distinguished by their coloration and size: A. cerana tends to be darker and smaller, while A. nigrocincta tends to be larger and have a yellowish clypeus (the lower area of the face). They can best be differentiated using morphometrics, which can also be used to identify morphologically distinct populations in both species.

The architecture of the colonies is also a point of difference: the opening of the drone cell of A. cerana is covered in wax, under which there is a conical cocoon with a central hole or pore. In A. nigrocincta, however, the cell of the drone has a narrow opening, without a hard wax cap and hole. In addition, the queens of A. nigrocincta generally create colonies with greater numbers of drones than those of A. cerana.

The species builds nests in cavities like the closely related Apis cerana. In fact, there are few substantial differences between the two species: the genitals of the respective drones, for instance, are identical. However, there are small morphological differences, genetic polymorphism in the mitochondrial DNA, as well as behavioral differences.

Apis nigrocincta contracts the parasite-caused honey bee disease Varroosis by playing host to the species of Varroa mite known as Varroa underwoodi. In this way, they are similar to Apis cerana nuluensis, which is also susceptible to the same species of parasite.
