= Varroa underwoodi =

Scientific classification
- Domain: Eukaryota
- Kingdom: Animalia
- Phylum: Arthropoda
- Subphylum: Chelicerata
- Class: Arachnida
- Order: Mesostigmata
- Family: Varroidae
- Genus: Varroa
- Species: V. underwoodi

Binomial name
- Varroa underwoodi Delfinado-Baker and Aggarwal 1987

Species of mite

Varroa underwoodi is a mite that feeds on honey bees. It is an external parasite of the western honey bee (Apis mellifera), Asian honey bee (A. cerana), A. nigrocincta, and A. nuluensis V. underwoodi has been found on multiple bee species in Southern Asia, though has only been found on the Asian honey bee in China. The smallest sized V. underwoodi was collected from Papua New Guinea from western honey bee hives.

== Hosts ==
Hosts are primarily Apis dorsata, A. laboriosa and A. breviligula. Includes A. cerana.
