= Honey bee mite =

The Honey bee mite may refer to:

- Acarapis woodi, honey bee tracheal mite
- Tropilaelaps, primary hosts are the larva of Apis dorsata and Apis laboriosa but can also infect Apis mellifera
- Varroa destructor, bee mite that attacks honey bees Apis cerana and Apis mellifera
