= Apis cerana nuluensis =

Borneo honey bee

Scientific classification
- Kingdom: Animalia
- Phylum: Arthropoda
- Clade: Pancrustacea
- Class: Insecta
- Order: Hymenoptera
- Family: Apidae
- Genus: Apis
- Species: A. cerana
- Subspecies: A. c. nuluensis

Trinomial name
- Apis cerana nuluensis Tingek, Koeniger & Koeniger, 1996

Subspecies of honey bee

Apis cerana nuluensis is a subspecies of honey bee described in 1996 by Tingek, Koeniger & Koeniger. The geographic distribution of the subspecies is the southeastern Asian island of Borneo, politically divided between Indonesia, Malaysia, and Brunei.

A. c. nuluensis is one of a number of Indonesian honey bees, including the more obscure Apis koschevnikovi and Apis nigrocincta (the latter of which has nearby habitat on nearby Sulawesi and Mindanao islands)

A. c. nuluensis workers appear as dark honeybees. They have black tibiae and light brown femora, with long hairs and whitish tomentum on the abdomen. Drones are entirely black with no yellow/rufous color. A. c. nuluensis Wing length is between 9.3mm and 9.8mm.

While this was originally described as a species, it has since been classified as a geographic race (subspecies) of the widespread A. cerana. Molecular evidence suggests it is divergent enough in its DNA sequences to potentially represent a biological species, but there has been no formal reassignment to date, and no hybridization studies have been performed to confirm this hypothesis.

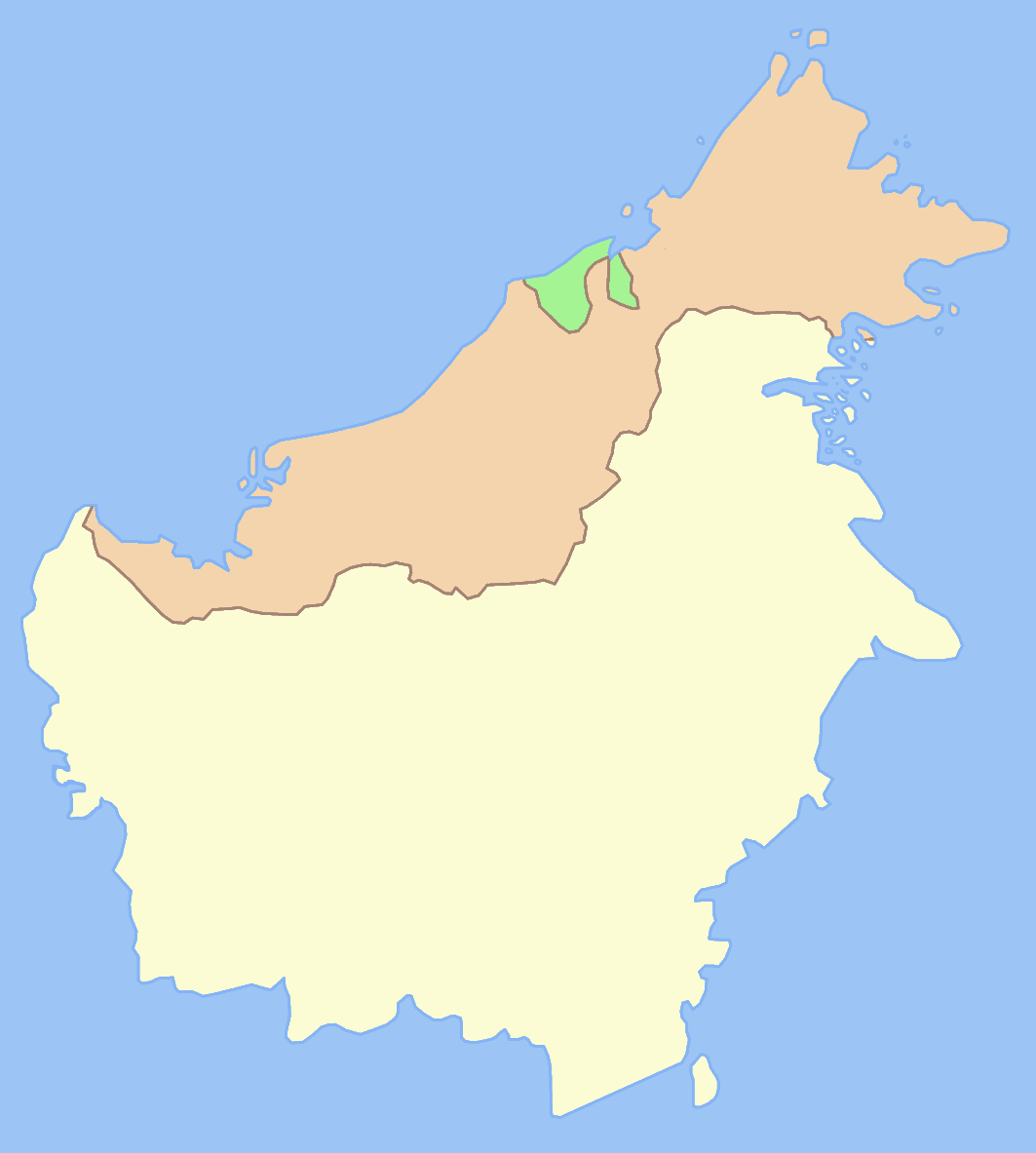
The island of Borneo, habitat of A. nuluensis

Like many honey bees, A. c. nuluensis is liable to infestation by the parasitic Varroa mite, although in this case the particular species is Varroa underwoodi (in this aspect, A. c. nuluensis is similar to A. nigrocincta).
