= Varroa rindereri =

Scientific classification
- Kingdom: Animalia
- Phylum: Arthropoda
- Subphylum: Chelicerata
- Class: Arachnida
- Order: Mesostigmata
- Family: Varroidae
- Genus: Varroa
- Species: V. rindereri

Binomial name
- Varroa rindereri de Guzman & Delfinado-Baker, 1996

Species of mite

Varroa rindereri is an external parasitic mite that feeds on honey bees. The only known honey bee species it feeds on Apis koschevnikovi.

Its geographic range includes Southeast Asia, including the Malaysian peninsula. The species is one of the four known species within the Varroa genus in addition to V. destructor, V. jacobsoni, and V. underwoodi. Compared to these other species of Varroa, V. rindereri is typically larger with an average length of 1,180 μm.
