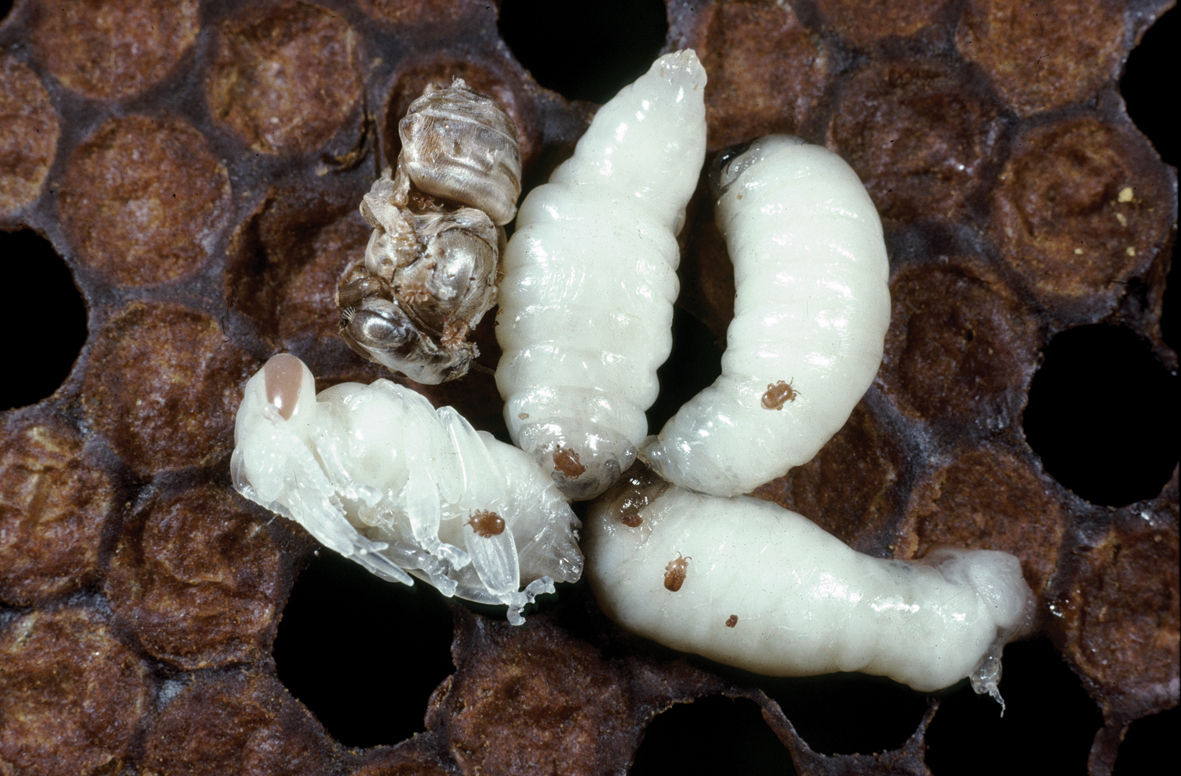
- Tropilaelaps mites on European honey bee larvae

Scientific classification
- Kingdom: Animalia
- Phylum: Arthropoda
- Subphylum: Chelicerata
- Class: Arachnida
- Order: Mesostigmata
- Family: Laelapidae
- Genus: Tropilaelaps; Delfinado & Baker, 1961

= Tropilaelaps =

Genus of mites

Tropilaelaps is a genus of parasitic mites in the family Laelapidae. Their range spans the Philippines, Thailand, Vietnam, India, Sri Lanka, Afghanistan and Pakistan. T. mercedesae has now established a foothold in Europe with verified reports in the Krasnodar region, Western Russia and Turkey. Their primary hosts are the larva of Apis dorsata and Apis laboriosa, although after Apis mellifera was imported to Asia, they were found to also be suitable hosts for two species of Tropilaelaps, T. clareae and T. mercedesae. Species can be identified by DNA analysis. They are considered a major economic threat to the beekeeping industry.

Tropilaelaps are ectoparasites that reduce the lifespans of individual bees and reduce their overall health and wellbeing by depriving them of nutrients and inflicting injuries. Evidence of Tropilaelaps presence in a hive might include deformed wings or legs on honey bees. Although the current body of knowledge regarding Tropilaelaps is lacking in many areas, early trials indicate that certain concentrations of formic acid vapors may treat Tropilaelaps infestations in beehives.

== Species ==
- Tropilaelaps mercedesae Delfinado & Baker, 1961
- Tropilaelaps clareae Delfinado & Baker, 1961
- Tropilaelaps koenigerum Delfinado-Baker & Baker, 1982
- Tropilaelaps thaii Anderson & Morgan, 2007

== Interaction with other organisms ==
=== Honeybees ===
Tropilaelaps mites are especially dangerous as they can be hard to spot, being translucent and around three-forths of a millimeter long. They are estimated to lay eggs every 24 hours, and take 7 days to develop.

Tropilaelaps’ sole diet is the blood of developing honeybees. Pregnant tropilaelaps mites have been observed to seal themselves in a honeycomb cell with a developing bee, using the bee to feed herself and her young. The young who are not trapped still could suffer damage when nurse bees rip off the wax cell caps in an attempt to find the mites, removing the barrier that separates the pupa from the outside world. Their feeding does damage to the immune system of bees, leaving them vulnerable to the viruses that Tropilaelaps carry. These viruses could cause death, deformities and paralysis.

=== Varroa ===
Varroa and Tropilaelaps have been known to coexist well, as they share their food and even can reproduce in the same hive cell.

== Location ==
Tropilaelaps live around Southeast Asia and other tropical countries like Korea, but over recent years, they have been reported to be seen in colder climates such as Russia, Kazakhstan and Georgia. There is growing concern of Tropilaelaps’ spread to North America, though there have been no reports of detected Tropilaelaps in the area.
