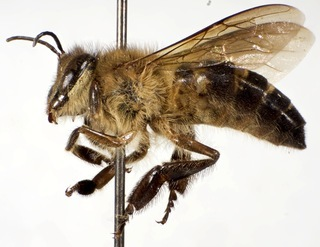

Scientific classification
- Kingdom: Animalia
- Phylum: Arthropoda
- Clade: Pancrustacea
- Class: Insecta
- Order: Hymenoptera
- Family: Apidae
- Genus: Apis
- Species: A. koschevnikovi

Binomial name
- Apis koschevnikovi Enderlein, 1906
- Range of Apis koschevnikovi

Synonyms
- Apis mellifica indica var koschevnikovi Buttel-Reepen 1906; Apis indica var koschevnikovi Enderlein, 1906; Apis (Sigmatapis) vechti vechti Maa, 1953; Apis (Sigmatapis) vechti linda Maa, 1953; Apis cerana koschevnikovi Enderlein, 1906

= Apis koschevnikovi =

Koschevnikov's honey bee

Species of bee

Apis koschevnikovi, Koschevnikov's honey bee, is a species of honey bee which inhabits Malaysian and Indonesian Borneo, where it lives sympatrically with other honey bee species such as Apis cerana (specifically A. c. nuluensis).

The species was first described by Hugo Berthold von Buttel-Reepen, who dedicated it to Grigory Aleksandrovich Kozhevnikov (1866–1933), a pioneer of honey bee morphology. This was an invalid designation, however, and the name was first formally made available by Günther Enderlein that same year. Therefore, Buttel-Reepen is not the author of the name (following the ICZN). The species was described again by Maa in 1953, this time with the name Apis vechti. It was finally rediscovered by Tingek and his colleagues in 1988.

== Taxonomy and phylogeny ==
Apis koschevnikovi is of the family Apidae and genus Apis. A. koschevnikovi is known as one of the "Red Bees" of Borneo, described in 1988. A. koschevnikovi appears together with A. cerana and A. mellifera, two other cavity-nesting species, in three separate phylogenic clusters without overlapping. The phylogenetic cluster analysis of A. koschevnikovi is found directly in contact with a cluster of A. cerana and distant from A. mellifera.

== Description and identification ==
A. koschevnikovi is often referred to in the literature as the "red bee of Sabah"; however A. koschevnikovi is pale reddish in Sabah State, Borneo, Malaysia, but a dark, coppery color in the Malay Peninsula and Sumatera, Indonesia.

=== Physical appearance ===
The workers, the queen, and the drones of A. koschevnikovi are all dark brown banded. The workers, however, have light orange abdominal bands while the queen and the drones have light brown abdominal bands. Ko is the gene responsible for the expression of body color type in A. koschevnikovi. This gene is shown to be sex-linked, since experiments have shown that a cross between a brown, dark banded queen and a brown, dark banded drone results in orange, dark banded workers.

A. koschevnikovi is very long-tongued (5.870 mm) and slender, with narrow tomenta. A. koschevnikovi is larger than its sympatric A. cerana, consistently being 10 to 15% larger linearly. A. koschevnikovi also has two distinct characteristics which are species specific – its drones have a secondary sex characteristic of a hairy fringe on the margin of the tibia of the hind leg, and worker bee forewing venation shows a cubital index which is large and varied.

== Distribution and habitat ==
The habitat of A. koschevnikovi is limited to the tropical evergreen forests of the Malay Peninsula, Borneo, and Sumatra. They do not live in tropical evergreen rain forests which extend into Thailand, Myanmar, Cambodia, and Vietnam. This area is associated with a change from wet seasonal evergreen rain forests to mixed moist deciduous forests. Its altitudinal distributions extend from sea level to about 1600 meters.

The range for A. koschevnikovi is diminishing because it is now either poorly represented or absent in the several areas where it had been previously located. This has been attributed to habitat changes resulting from deforestation and the establishment of tea, oil palm, rubber, and coconut plantations.

Not much is known about the nest structure of Apis koschevnikovi. They live in small colonies making a few combs within small tree cavities in the rain forest.

== Behavior ==
=== Mating behavior ===
The drones for A. koschevnikovi have a specific mating time that is species-specific. Regardless of whether or not they were in a conspecific or other species' colony, the drones will fly at their species specific mating time. The queens also follow their own internal clock. This allows for a reproductive isolation mechanism that is based on individual behavior of the sexual castes.

=== Costs and benefits of sociality ===
Apis koschevnikovi have a very small colony size of a thousand bees or so. This small colony size allows them to survive in a rain forest habitat. Despite their small colony size, they are still able to harvest resources very quickly and reproduce at a fast pace during the general flowering period.

=== Queen acceptance of different species ===
There is a strong tendency for preference of conspecific larvae in A. koschevnikovi. A. koschevnikovi is even more selective with regard to the acceptance of a young alien queen. When too young of a queen of a different species is introduced into the colony of an A. koschevnikovi, the alien queen uses a buzzing sound in response to the aggression from the worker bees. This is successful at first until the aggressive behavior towards the queen increases with the age of the queen. After the third or fourth day of emergence, the worker queens mutilate and expel the alien queen from the colony. The current hypothesis for the observed worker bee aggression is thought to be from the wrong blend of queen pheromones released from the alien queen.

== Interaction with other species ==
=== Diet ===
A. koschevnikovi is a honey bee nectar-feeder. A. koschevnikovi is a steady resident component of the rain forest and visits flowers during the entire year. In Bornean primary forests, A. dorsata and A. koschevnikovi are the only honeybees that appear frequently at flowering canopy trees or at baits. At the Lambir Hills National Park in Malaysia, these two honeybees visited 29 flower species, making them visitors of 10% of the plant species and 22% of the plant families of the park.

=== Defense of resources ===
Even though A. koschevnikovi and A. dorsata share mostly the same rain forest habitat and overlap spatially in using trees at all heights in the canopy, they are still able to coexist. They differ in size and tongue length, which helps separate resource use. Only half of the resources that A. koschevnikovi uses are shared with A. dorsata.

However, in contrast to normal feeding behavior, A. koschevnikovi and A. dorsata fight at artificial feeding stations. They displayed a displaced nest-defense behavior with grappling and attempted stinging. Honey bees do not interact well with competing foragers when near a rich resource. A. koschevnikovi has even shown aggression against conspecific foragers when competing for a resource. Honey bees tend to dominate floral patches as individual colonies because of their competitive nature.

=== Parasites ===
A. koschevnikovi hosts a unique species of the honey bee parasitic mite genus Varroa, named Varroa rindereri. Although this parasite species is quite similar to Varroa jacobsoni it is perfectly differentiable. V. rindereri is larger (1,180 x 1,698 micrometers). V. rindereri also has a fewer number of setae and pores on the sternal shield. It has a long and wide-looped peritreme, and the trochanter of the palpus lacks a seta. When pupae were removed from their cells, V. rindereri remained inside the cells. It has only been reported in colonies of A. koschevnikovi in Borneo and seems to be specific to that species, as it has yet to be observed crossing over to colonies of A. cerana, even when they live in the same apiary.

=== Interspecies broods ===
When a brood of A. cerana drones are hatched in a colony of A. koschevnikovi, they are fully taken care of and raised to maturity. Likewise when A. koschevnikovi drones are hatched in a colony of A. cerana they are completely integrated into the society of their host. However, it has been shown that despite the crossfostering of drones, each species will not change its mating time and flight habits, even if it is raised as an alien drone.
