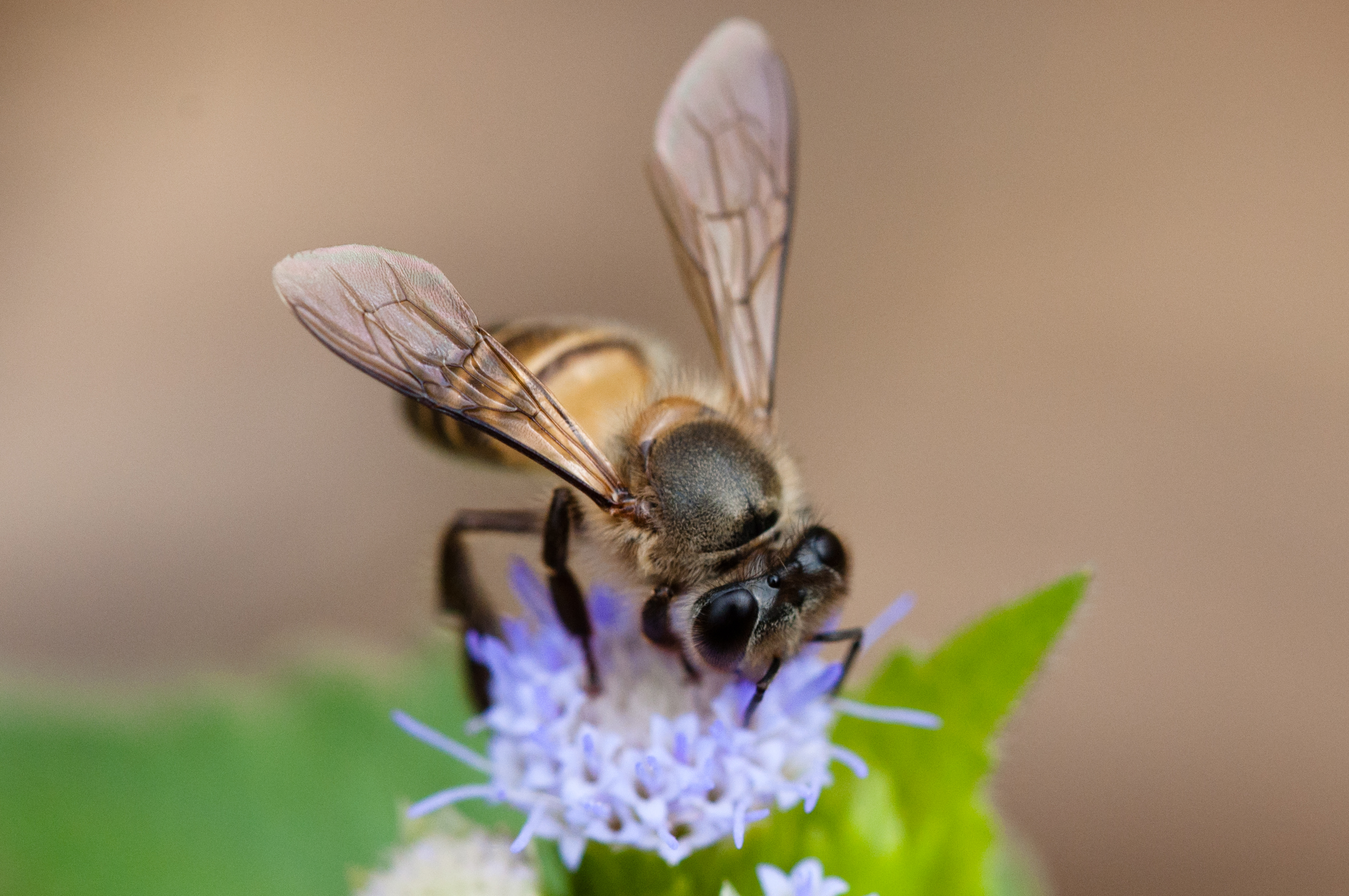
- Asiatic honey bee - Khao Yai National Park, Thailand
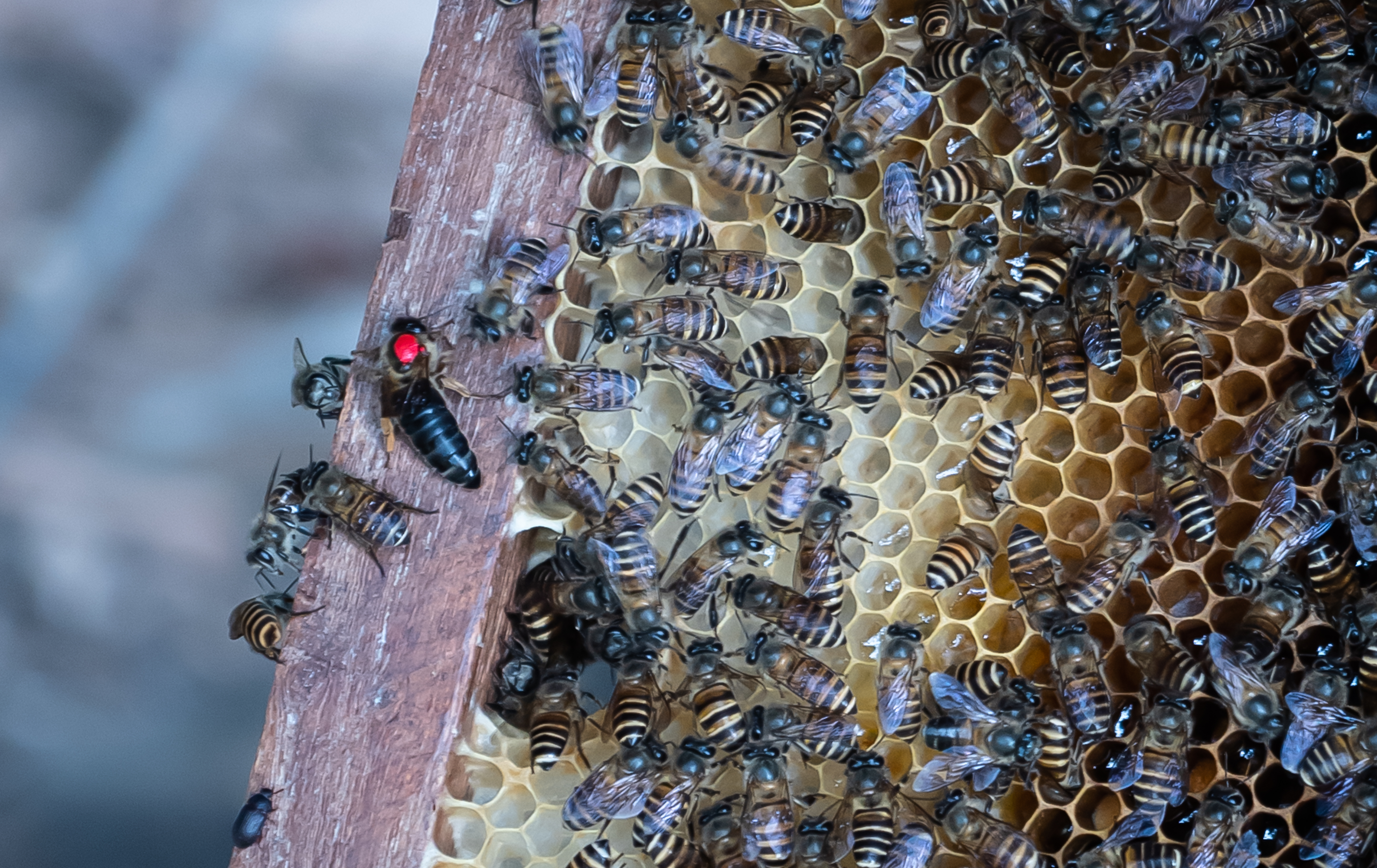
- Apis cerana workers and queen (marked with red dot) from hive near Chiang Mai, Thailand

Scientific classification
- Kingdom: Animalia
- Phylum: Arthropoda
- Clade: Pancrustacea
- Class: Insecta
- Order: Hymenoptera
- Family: Apidae
- Genus: Apis
- Species: A. cerana

Binomial name
- Apis cerana Fabricius, 1793
- Range of Apis cerana

= Apis cerana =

Eastern honey bee

Species of honey bee

Apis cerana, the eastern honey bee, Asiatic honey bee or Asian honey bee, is a species of honey bee native to South, Southeast and East Asia. This species is the sister species of Apis koschevnikovi and both are in the same subgenus as the western (European) honey bee, Apis mellifera. A. cerana is known to live sympatrically along with Apis koschevnikovi within the same geographic location. Apis cerana colonies are known for building nests consisting of multiple combs in cavities containing a small entrance, presumably for defense against invasion by individuals of another nest. The diet of this honey bee species consists mostly of pollen and nectar, or honey. Moreover, Apis cerana is known for its highly social behavior, reflective of its classification as a type of honey bee.

The terms Apis cerana indica and Apis Indica or Indian honey bee, is a historic term, with all Asian hive bees now referred to as Apis cerana.

== Taxonomy and phylogeny ==
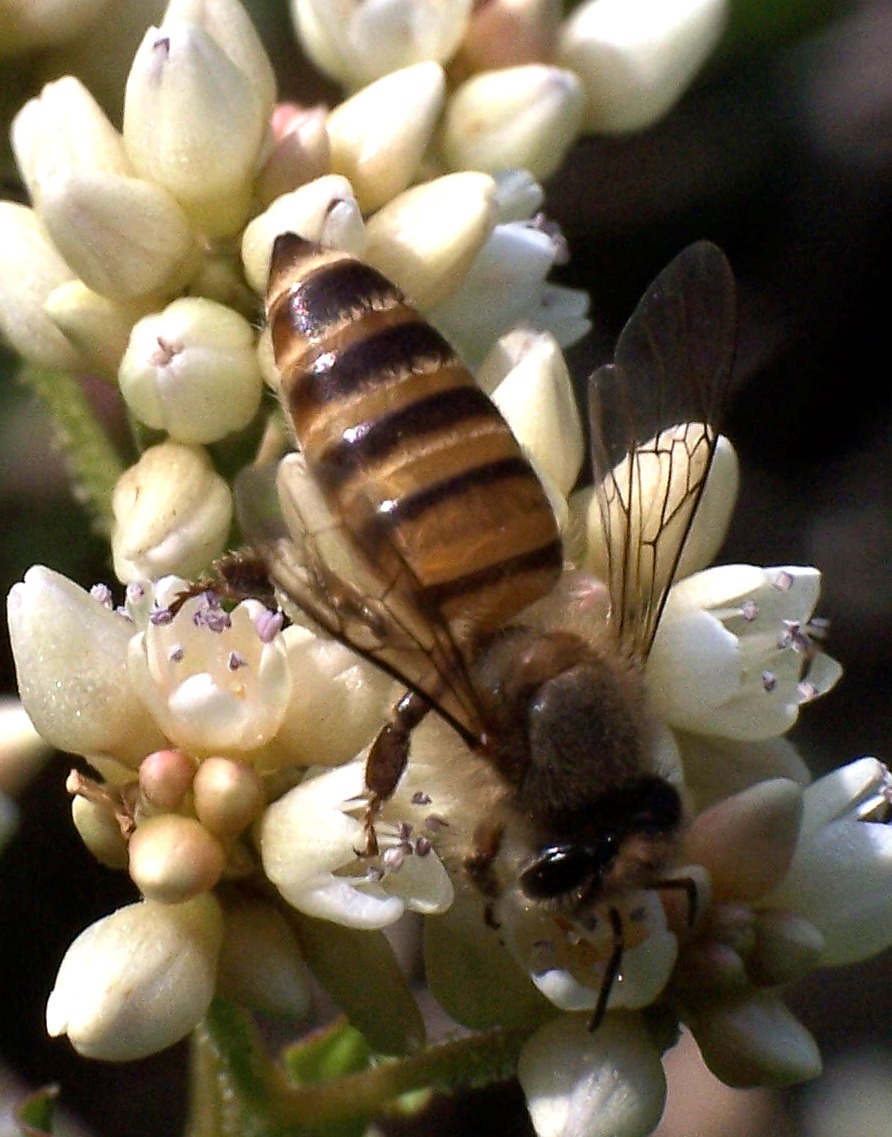
Apis cerana

Danish zoologist Johan Christian Fabricius described Apis cerana, also known as the eastern or Asian honey bee, in 1793. The genus name Apis is Latin for "bee". The eastern honey bee is of the Apidae family, one of the most diverse families of bees, including honey bees, carpenter bees, orchid bees, bumblebees, cuckoo bees, and even stingless bees.

In the past, there has been discussion that Apis cerana and Apis mellifera are simply distinct races of the same species. This is essentially due to overwhelming similarities in both morphology and behavior, as both are medium-sized bees (10-11mm) that generally build multiple comb nests inside cavities. Other honey bee species, including the giant honey bees Apis dorsata and Apis laboriosa, generally construct nests consisting of a single comb in open areas. However, despite the striking similarities between Apis cerana and Apis mellifera, there is evidence to suggest that these two species are quite distinct; for example, mating between these species does not produce offspring. In addition, while Apis mellifera colonies can reach sizes of up to 50,000 or more individuals, Apis cerana colonies are relatively small, with only around 6,000 to 7,000 workers. Moreover, Apis cerana is found predominantly in the Eastern Asian region of the world, while Apis mellifera is found predominantly in the Western European and African region of the world. For these reasons, it has now been concluded that these are in fact two separate species, contrary to prior beliefs.

=== Infraspecific groupings ===
Historically, Apis cerana has been subdivided into eight subspecies according to Engel (1999); they are:

- Apis cerana cerana Fabricius (= sinensis) (Chinese honey bee) - Afghanistan, Pakistan, northern India, northern Vietnam, southern and coastal China, Taiwan, South Korea and North Korea and Primorsky Krai in Russia
- Apis cerana heimifeng Engel (black Chinese honey bee) - highlands in central China
- Apis cerana indica Fabricius (Indian honey bee) - Southern India, Sri Lanka, Bangladesh
- Apis cerana japonica Fabricius (Japanese honey bee) - Japan
- Apis cerana javana Enderlein (Javan honey bee) - Java to East Timor
- Apis cerana johni Skorikov (Sumatran honey bee) - Sumatra
- Apis cerana nuluensis Tingek, Koeniger and Koeniger (Bornean honey bee) - Borneo
- Apis cerana skorikovi Engel (= himalaya) (Himalayan honey bee) - the central and eastern Himalayan mountains (Ruttner, 1987)

Recent genetic analysis, however, has determined that some of the subspecies described may have been inadvertent misidentifications of very similar sympatric species, including Apis koschevnikovi of Borneo and Apis nigrocincta of the Philippines. Apis cerana nuluensis of Borneo is also now generally considered to be a separate species, as Apis nuluensis.

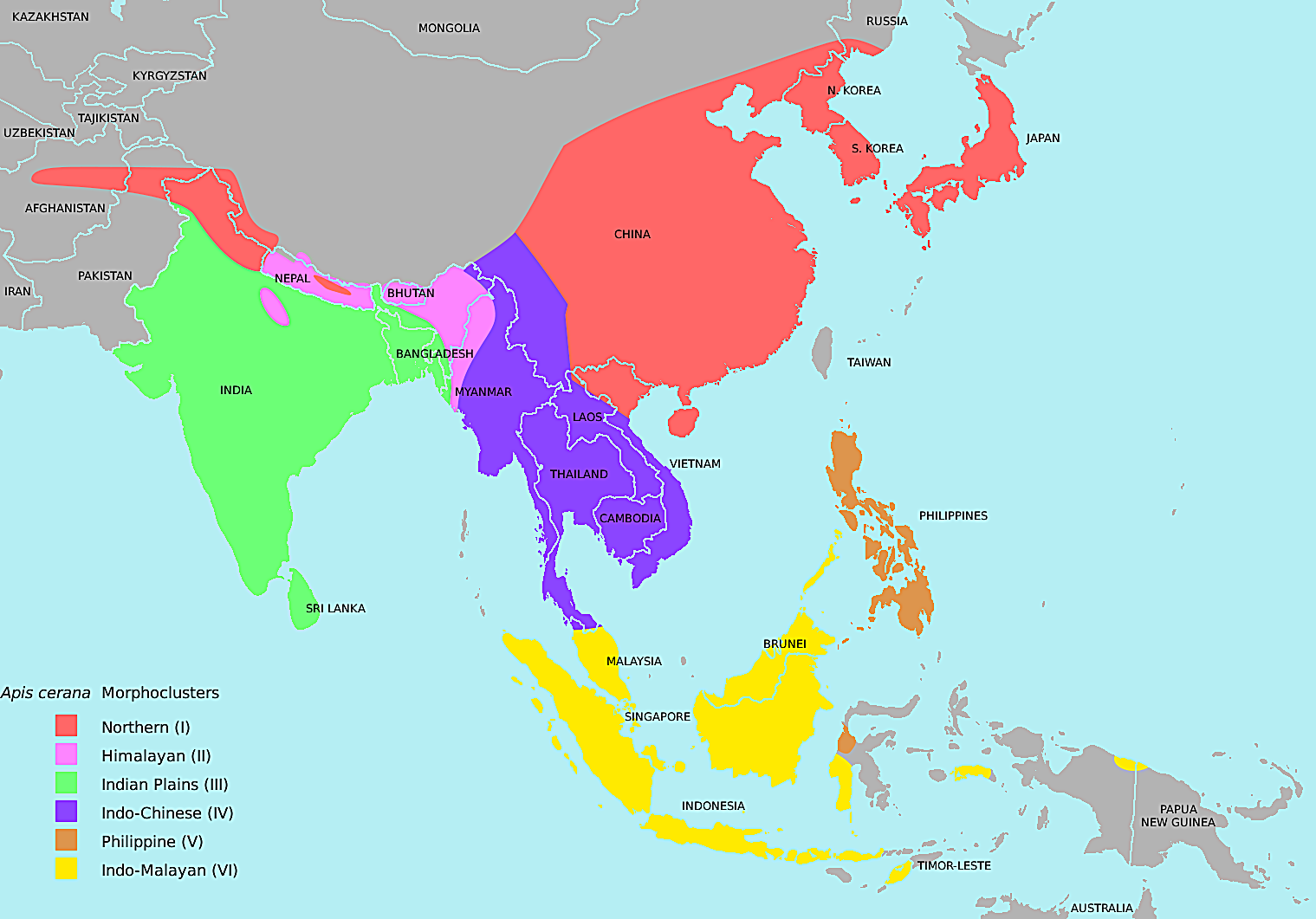
Geographical distribution of the six Apis cerana morphocluster groups (Radloff et al., 2010)

Radloff et al. (2010) have instead chosen to subdivide Apis cerana into six main statistically defined populations based on morphotypes ("morphoclusters"), instead of infraspecific ranks, which they argue were invalidly established and not biologically meaningful. These morphoclusters are:

- Northern cerana (Morphocluster I) - extends from northern Afghanistan and Pakistan to northwest India, southern Tibet, northern Myanmar, China and into the Korean Peninsula, far eastern Russia and Japan. They can be further subdivided into six subclusters: an "Indus" group (Afghanistan, Pakistan, Kashmir); a "Himachali" group (Himachal Pradesh, India); an "Aba" group (larger bees in southern Gansu, central and northern Sichuan, northern China and Russia); a central and eastern China subcluster; a "southern" cerana subcluster in southern Yunnan, Guangdong, Guangxi and Hainan; and a "Japonica" group in Japan, North Korea and South Korea.

- Synonyms: A. skorikovi, A. c. abansis, A. c. abanensis, A. c. bijjieca, A. c. cathayca, A. c. cerana, A. c. fantsun, A. c. hainana, A. c. hainanensis, A. c. heimifeng, A. c. indica, A. c. japonica, A. c. javana, A. c. kweiyanga, A. c. maerkang, A. c. pekinga, A. c. peroni, A. c. skorikovi, A. c. shankianga and A. c. twolareca

- Himalayan cerana (Morphocluster II) - extends from northern India, Tibet and Nepal. Has two subclusters: the "Hills" group (northeast) and the "Ganges" group (southwest).

- Synonyms: A. c. indica

- Indian Plains cerana (Morphocluster III) - extends from the plains of central and southern India and into Sri Lanka and Bangladesh; also known as the Plains cerana .

- Synonyms: A. c. indica

- Indo-Chinese cerana (Morphocluster IV) - extends from Myanmar, northern Thailand, Laos, Cambodia and southern Vietnam.

- Synonyms: A. c. indica and A. c. javana

- Philippine cerana (Morphocluster V) - restricted mostly to the Philippines, excluding Palawan. Has three subclusters, the "Luzon" bees, "Visayas" bees and "Mindanao" bees, with the latter two being more closer morphometrically than the "Luzon" bees. A population is also found in central Sulawesi.

- Synonyms: A. philippina, A. c. philippina and A. c. samarensis

- Indo-Malayan cerana (Morphocluster VI) - extends from southern Thailand, Malaysia, Indonesia and Palawan (the Philippines). Has three subclusters: one in Palawan, another in northern Borneo and Kalimantan and another in Java, Bali, Irian Jaya, Sulawesi and Sumatra.

- Synonyms: A. cerana, A. indica, A. javana, A. c. johni, A. lieftincki, A. peroni, A. vechti linda and A. v. vechti

Latest 2023 list of sub species of Apis cerana:

1. Apis cerana cerana
2. Apis cerana kashmirensis
3. Apis cerana japonica
4. Apis cerana hainana
5. Apis cerana abansis
6. Apis cerana guidensis
7. Apis cerana skorikovi
8. Apis cerana taiwanesis

== Description and identification ==
The physical characteristics of Apis cerana individuals are very similar to those of other species in the genus Apis. The individuals in this genus are defined by long, erect hairs that cover the compound eyes and assist in pollen collection, strongly convex scutellum, and a jugal lobe in the hindwing. Adult Apis cerana are black in color, with four yellow abdominal stripes. There are also distinctions between worker bees, queens, and drones. Worker bees are characterized by a pollen press on the hind leg to transport pollen, as well as a stinger in the place of an organ for laying eggs. Queens, which are the reproductive females, are typically larger than worker bees due to their enlarged reproductive organs. Drones, which are the males of the species, are defined by larger eyes, lack of a stinger, and a blunter abdominal shape.

== Distribution and habitat ==
Apis cerana encompass a wide range of climatic zones including moist tropical rainforests, wet-dry tropical savannas, mid-latitude steppes, dry mid-latitude grasslands, moist continental deciduous forests, and taigas. The natural range of Apis cerana extends from Primorsky Krai in Russia in the north, to eastern Indonesia in the south; and to Japan in the east, to as far as the highlands of Afghanistan in the west. Countries they are native to include Afghanistan, Bangladesh, Bhutan, Brunei, Cambodia, China, India, Indonesia, Japan, Laos, Malaysia, Myanmar, Nepal, North Korea, Pakistan, the Philippines, Russia, South Korea, Sri Lanka, Taiwan, Thailand, Timor-Leste, and Vietnam. It was introduced deliberately to New Guinea in the 1970s, and has since spread into the Torres Strait Islands into Australia and the Solomon Islands. Although the species was naturally clustered in East Asia, it has now expanded to various regions across the world as a result of human interference, with particular concern about its invasive potential in Australia as nests are found in a variety of environments, including both natural and man-made (see below).

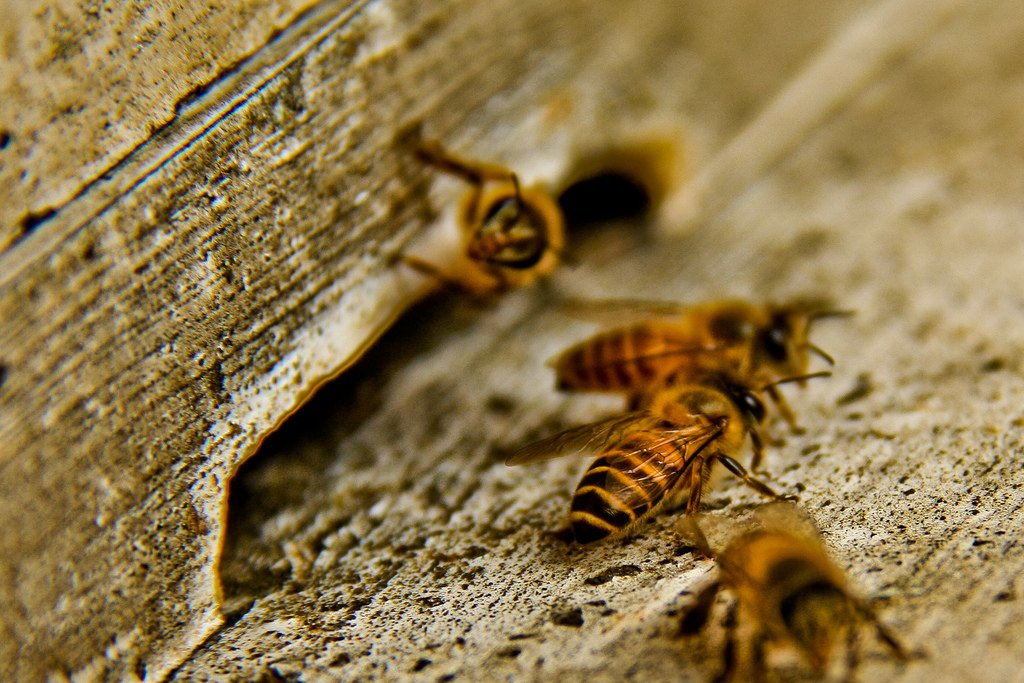
A. cerana in Nepal

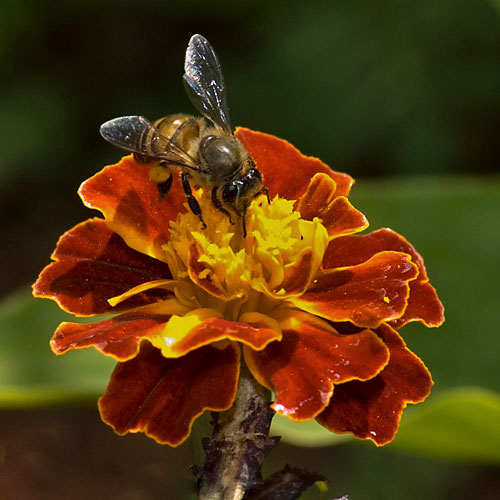
A. cerana in India

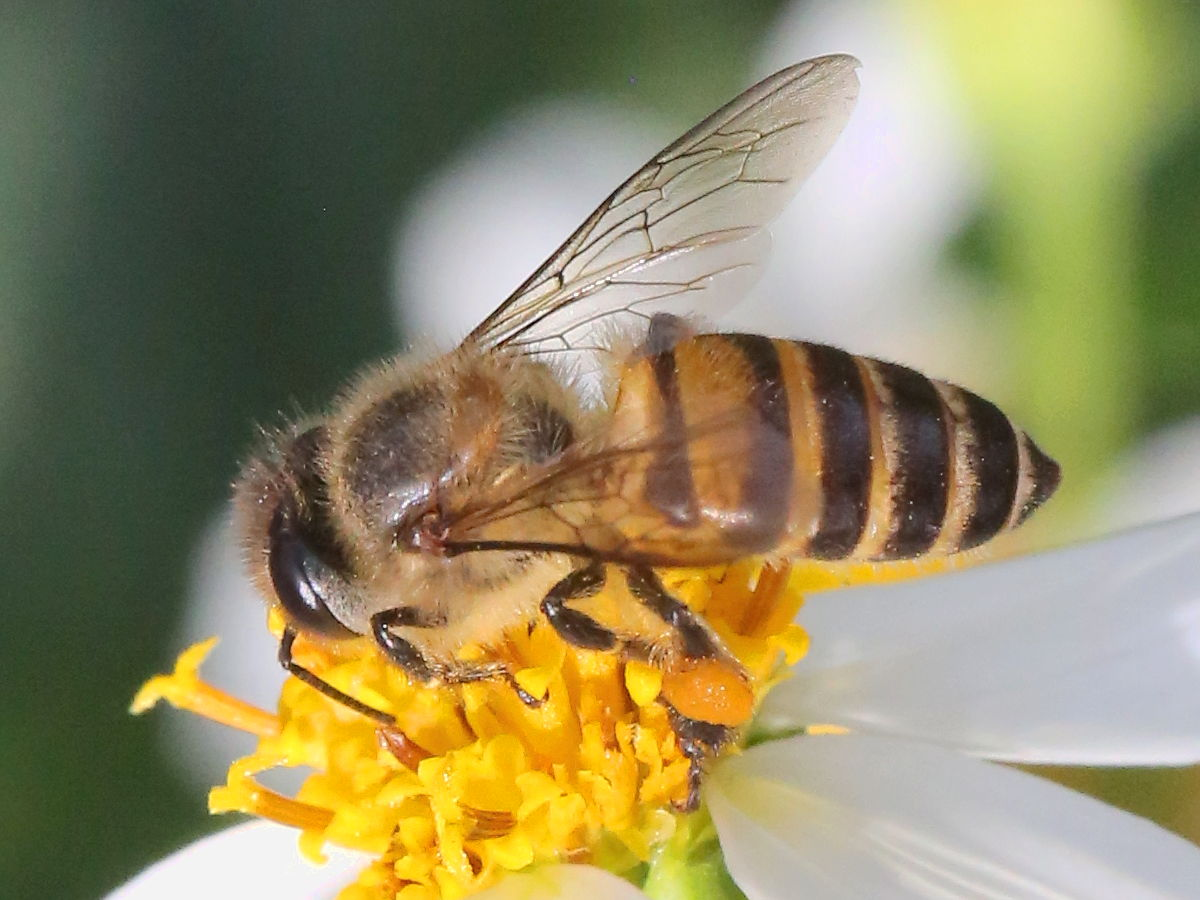
A. cerana in Thailand

=== Nest ===
As a type of honey bee, Apis cerana must collect and store around a third of its nectar in a concentrated form in order to ensure an adequate supply for consumption during the harsh winter. The nest is multi-combed and somewhat insulated, allowing the species to achieve optimal nest temperatures and thereby optimize foraging at early hours. The nest itself is a simple vertical comb made from wax secreted by workers, while the thermoregulation is generated by fanning and water evaporation from water collected in the field. This large-scale storage tactic requires the construction of a stable and sturdy comb structure for such honey storage. However, as the production of beeswax for a comb is an energetically expensive endeavor, colonies do not generally build the entire structure very early on. Instead, the colony builds a smaller set of combs that satisfies the initial storage needs. Upon moving into the new nest, the colony will then continue to enlarge the combs until there are enough storage units to sufficiently account for all of the required honey. In general, the initial set of combs may account for around 20,000 cells, while the final, completed structure may contain up to 100,000. These nests are typically large enough to host around 6,000 to 7,000 individuals and are found in a wide range of external environments.

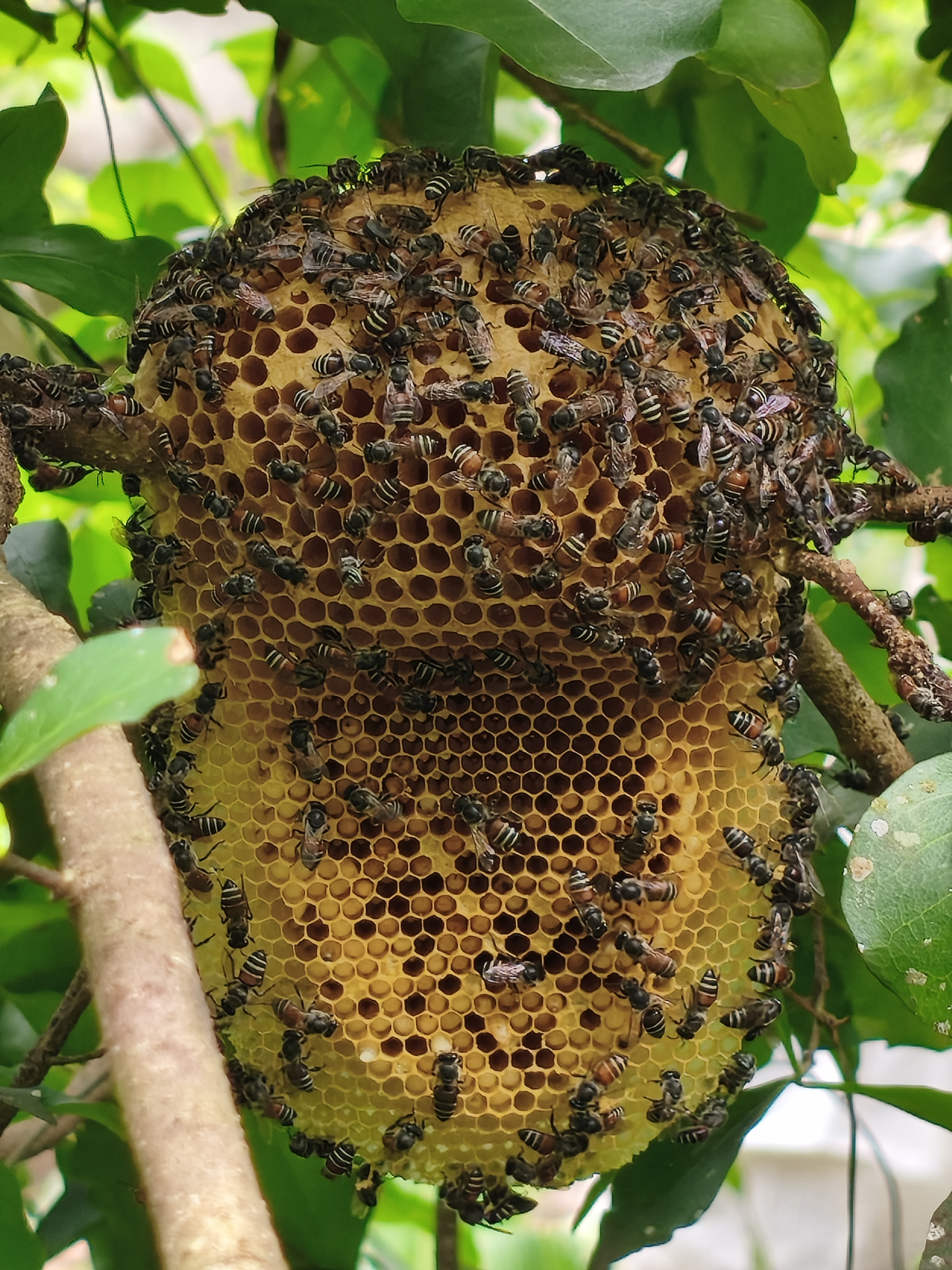
Hive of Asian Honey Bee in progress

==== Nest thermoregulation ====
A. cerana maintains internal hive temperatures with a precision similar to that of A. mellifera, using similar mechanisms. A. cerana maintain body temperatures in a range of 33–35.5 °C even while ambient temperatures vary between 12 and 36 °C. This mechanism clearly shows them to possess effective nest thermoregulation systems. During summer, A. cerana employs evaporative cooling, where the worker bees cluster outside the nest in hot weather and fan their wings, thus removing excess heat and moisture from the nest and decreasing the hive temperature.

==== Thermal defense ====
When an A. cerana hive is invaded by the Japanese giant hornet (Vespa mandarinia), about 500 Japanese honey bees (A. cerana japonica) surround the hornet and vibrate their flight muscles until the temperature is raised to 47 °C (117 °F), heating the hornet to death, but keeping the temperature still under their own lethal limit (48–50 °C).

== Behavior ==
=== Colony cycle ===
The colony of Apis cerana, a typical honey bee, consists of several thousand female worker bees, one queen bee, and several hundred male drone bees. The colony is constructed inside beeswax combs inside a tree cavity, with a special peanut-shaped structure on the margins of the combs where the queens are reared.

The colony's annual cycle in cold temperature regions begins shortly after the winter solstice, when the colony raises the core temperature of its cluster to about 34 degrees Celsius and starts to rear brood. At first, only around 100 bees are produced, but several thousand bees are developing by early spring. By late spring, the colony will have already attained full size, and will begin to reproduce. The colony then rears several new queens, and divides itself with about half the workers plus the old queen once the new queens have nearly matured. This new swarm then flies to a new tree branch, explores nest cavities, and then directs the other bees to the new site once satisfied with the location.

During the remainder of summer and into the fall, the colonies in the new locations build combs, rear brood, and gather food to quickly rebuild their populations and food reserves prior to the arrival of winter.

=== Division of labor ===
As a social species, Apis cerana colonies contain divisions of labor depending on what each member of the group is specialized to perform. There is generally only one queen bee whose sole responsibility it is to lay eggs; therefore, she is the mother of all the workers present in the colony. Apart from the queen bee, the remaining female bees are known as the worker bees, as these individuals perform all the tasks necessarily to maintain the hive including tending to the eggs, larvae, and pupae, foraging for food and water, cleaning the beehive and producing honey. These tasks are divided among the female worker bees by a factor of age. The remaining individuals are the males, known as the "drones," whose only responsibility is to mate with a queen from another colony; therefore, drones are solely produced during the reproductive season.

=== Communication ===
The principal method of communication is the waggle dance, performed primarily when a worker bee discovers a rich source of pollen or nectar and wishes to share this knowledge with her fellow nest-mates. The waggle dance occurs deep inside the colony's hive, where the worker bee performs a brief reenactment of the recent journey to a patch of flowers. Neighboring bees observe and learn this dance and can then follow the same pattern, utilizing the odor of the flowers to fly in a certain path and arrive at the same destination. The bees following the informed worker bee will extend their antennae towards the dancer in order to detect the dance sounds, as the frequency of the bee's antennae closely matches the vibration frequency of its wings. The overall direction and duration of each waggle is closely correlated with the direction and distance from the flower patch being described.

=== Mating behavior ===
Within the honey bee colony, a queen bee typically mates with 10 or more males. This extensive mating is performed in an effort to secure a great range of genetic variation in her colony to cope with diseases, as well as respond to nectar sources and a wide range of external stimuli. Apart from the queen bee, the only other sexual members of the society are the male drones, whose only function is to mate with the queen, after which they will die.

The exact time and place of Apis cerana mating is specific to the subspecies, often varying by local environment. For instance, in Sri Lanka, Apis cerana males typically aggregate beside a tree canopy as opposed to above a tree as is found in the Apis cerana subspecies of Japan. The most significant factor in determining mating time, however, is not ecological conditions, but rather the presence of drones of other species. Mating time decreases as the number of non-species drones present increases.

==== Reproductive swarming ====
In A. cerana, reproductive swarming is similar to A. mellifera. A. cerana reproductive swarms settle 20–30 m away from the natal nest (the mother or primary colony) and stay for a few days before departing for a new nest site after getting information from scout bees. Scout bees search for suitable cavities in which to construct the swarm's home. Successful scouts come back and report the location of suitable nesting sites to the other bees by performing communication dances on the surface of the swarm cluster in the same way as for food sources.

===== Absconding behavior =====
A. cerana has migration and absconding behavior, abandoning the current nest and building a new nest in a new location where an abundant supply of nectar and pollen is available. These bees usually do not store great amounts of honey, so they are more vulnerable to starvation if a prolonged shortage of nectar and pollen occurs. Absconding will start when not enough pollen and nectar are available. After the last brood emerges, the adult bees fill their honey stomachs from the hive's stores and swarm to establish a new nest at a new location. A. cerana has more absconding behavior than A. mellifera.

== Life history ==
The development of worker bees in a colony is typical of that for any insect that undergoes complete metamorphosis as it includes the four stages of egg, larva, pupa, and adult. The embryo grows inside the egg for 3 days, consuming the protein-rich egg yolk. Then it undergoes an 8-day larval stage, which is an intense feeding state involving honey, pollen, and brood food supplied by the adult bees. Finally, there is construction of a wax pupa which then matures and gnaws through the wax cap of the cell to emerge as a young bee.

== Kin selection ==
=== Genetic relatedness within colonies ===
As one queen generally mates with over a dozen males, the genetic relatedness of the colony is biased and represents haplodiploid sex determination. If the queen bee lays unfertilized eggs with no paternal genetic contribution, the eggs will develop into drones. If the queen bee lays fertilized eggs with both maternal and paternal genetic contribution, the eggs will develop into females. In this system, virgin queens sharing the same father will have a genetic relatedness of 0.75 and those of different fathers will have a genetic relatedness of only 0.25. The females workers in the colony are related to the queen's sons by a genetic relatedness of 0.25. Such biasing results in the genes of some female worker bees being represented disproportionately in the virgin queens.

=== Worker-queen conflict ===
Conflict may arise between workers and bees as female workers attempt to increase the propagation of their genes by biasing their queen-rearing efforts in favor of virgin queens sharing the same father. Although female worker bees do possess ovaries and can essentially produce viable eggs, this potential is almost never realized as long as the colony is ruled by a dominant queen. Therefore, the probability of personal reproduction by a worker bee is exceedingly low. "Worker policing," which is the mutual prevention of reproduction by workers, could be the reason behind the conscious non-reproduction of female worker bees. In other words, their fertility is controlled by queen signals. The queen honey bee informs workers of her presence by pheromones that she secretes from her mandibular glands. These signals are acquired by workers in close proximity to the queen and then spread to other workers in the colony, mainly by physical contact. In the presence of queen pheromone signals, the vast majority of workers refrain from activating their ovaries. Due to factors of genetic relatedness, an Apis cerana worker will often try to prevent other workers in her colony from reproducing, either by destroying worker-laid eggs, or by showing aggression towards workers attempting to lay eggs through worker policing.

== Interaction with other species ==
=== Diet ===
Adult worker bees predominantly feed on pollen and nectar or honey, though the nutritive value of pollen varies depending on the plant. Mixed pollens possess a high nutritive value and actually supply all the necessary materials for proper development of young animals. However, when dried, pollen quickly loses its nutritive value.

In addition to feeding themselves, bees also feed each other through a process known as "food transmission." Moreover, workers may also obtain food from the queen, while drones acquire food by ingesting material regurgitated by other drones. Queens themselves are fed larval food by the workers during their wintering season, thereby neither feeding on nor being fed honey.

==== Water requirement ====
In addition to food requirements for diet, water also plays a key role in the growth and development of adult bees. In fact, the form of food has little to no influence on the longevity and life expectancy of the bee as long as there is ready availability of water. This idea was further supported through experimental means concerning queen bees isolated in separate cages. Both groups were fed sugar candy as a control measure; however, the group that was fed water in addition to the sugar candy lived an average of two weeks or more compared to the other group which only survived a matter of three to four days. Moreover, the importance of water intake for an adult bee's survival can be further understood through examination of diet and behavior during prime seasons, during which colonies of bees consume large amounts of water in order to dilute honey produced as well as to regulate temperature in the nest.

=== Predators ===
Vespine wasps are a major predator for Apis cerana, predominantly at their colonies throughout Southern Asia. This hawking predation is especially fierce during the autumn season when the wasps are most populous, predominantly during the morning and afternoon. This method involves the wasps taking up a position in front of the beehive, while facing outwards away from the entrance towards returning foragers. Vespine wasps attempt to attack the honey bee quarry in an effort to gain provisions to aid in the development of their own offspring.

=== Defense ===
As the Vespine wasps approach the entrance to the honey bee nest, more guard bees are alerted, which in turn increases their probability of being killed by heat-balling bees. Heat balling is a unique defense system in which several hundred bees surround the wasp in a tight ball and vibrate their muscles in an effort to produce heat and effectively kill the wasp inside. Alternatively, however, in the presence of a wasp, the bees may also just withdraw into their nests and await the heat-balling circumstances to develop naturally. Furthermore, other bees may just decide to fly away as an evasive measure in times of conflict, often altering their specific flight styles in order to avoid predation.

==== Thermal defense ====
When an A. cerana hive is invaded by the Asian giant hornet (Vespa mandarinia), about 500 Japanese honey bees (A. cerana japonica) surround the hornet and vibrate their flight muscles until the temperature is raised to 47 °C (117 °F), heating the hornet to death, but keeping the temperature still under their own lethal limit (48–50 °C).

==== Wing shimmering ====
Although both Apis mellifera and Apis cerana suffer from predation from vespine wasps, one defense mechanism unique to Apis cerana is "wing shimmering". During this period of self-defense, bees collectively execute carefully timed waves of shimmering of their wings when approached by predators such as vespine wasps. This appears to serve as a distraction technique of visual pattern disruption that results in confusing predators. As a result, predators are unable to continue attacking additional bees.

==== Use of animal feces ====
A 2020 study in Vietnam found that Apis cerana use feces and even human urine to defend their hives against raids by hornets (Vespa soror), a strategy not replicated by their European and North American counterparts, though collection and use of feces in nest construction is well known in stingless bees.

=== Pathogens and parasites affecting Apis cerana ===
==== Microsporidia ====
Apis cerana is the natural host to the microsporidian parasite Nosema ceranae, a serious pest of the western honey bee. When first discovered near Beijing, China, in 1994, it was originally thought that Nosema ceranae was restricted to Apis cerana in the East Asian region. However, it has now been confirmed that this parasite species is actually present in colonies of Apis mellifera as well, both in Taiwan as well as Spain, though the origins of its arrival in Europe are still unknown. Bees infected with Nosema ceranae suffer reduced lifespans and increased mortality in the winter as well as poor buildup and reduced honey yield in the spring.

==== Mites ====
Apis cerana has also coevolved with the mite Varroa jacobsoni and thus exhibits more careful grooming than A. mellifera, thus has an effective defense mechanism against Varroa that keeps the mite from devastating colonies. Other than defensive behaviors such as these, much of their behavior and biology (at least in the wild) is very similar to that of A. mellifera.

==== Viruses ====
Asian honey bees are often infected by Chinese Sacbrood virus (CSBV) which also infects A. mellifera. Sacbrood viruses (SBV) primarily affect the brood of the honey bee and causes larval death. Infected larvae fail to pupate, and ecdysial fluid aggregates around the integument, forming the "sac" for which the disease is named. Infected larvae change in color from pearly white to pale yellow, and shortly after death they dry out, forming a dark brown gondola-shaped scale. SBV may also affect the adult bee, but in this case obvious signs of disease are lacking.

== An invasive species in Australia ==
Apis cerana was first detected in Australia in 2007. By 2012, it had spread across 500,000 hectares. The species is present in Queensland and the Torres Strait Islands, and a nest was found but then eradicated in Darwin, Northern Territory.

The impacts of Apis cerana on the Australian environment are not well known due to limited research. However, according to Biosecurity Queensland (2013), the Apis cerana "is likely to compete for pollen and nectar with native birds, mammals and insects, and for nesting sites in tree crevices". There is a strong possibility that Apis cerana will also compete for resources with commercial honey bees and affect primary producers who rely on their pollination services. Control costs are also significant and amounted to at least A$4 million up to 2011.

Efforts to eradicate Apis cerana in Australia have failed. Although an eradication program commenced in 2007, a decision that it was not possible to eradicate Apis cerana was made in 2011. The decision was controversial though, sparking a senate inquiry which concluded that it failed to apply the precautionary principle and assess the potential impacts of Apis cerana on biodiversity.

The bee is known as the Asian honey bee in Australia and is regarded as a biosecurity threat.

== Genetic database ==
As of 2015 the Biomodeling Laboratory at Seoul National University had constructed an Asian honey bee transcriptome database using an advanced sequencing technique.
