= Agricultural inspection =

Various kinds of agricultural inspection include:

- Biosecurity inspection
- Food inspection
- Phytosanitary inspection
- Meat inspection

See also:

- Phytosanitary certification, warranting inspection has occurred and was passed
