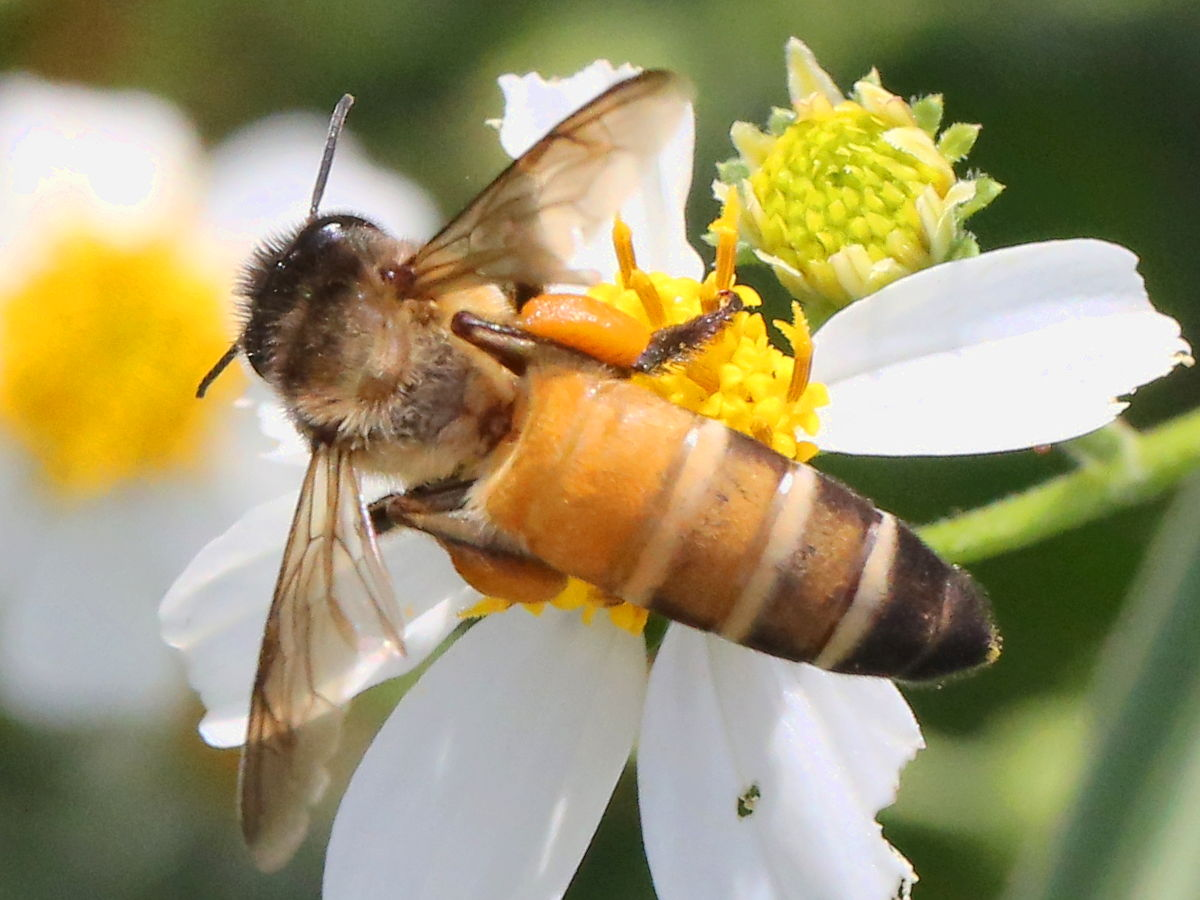
- Pollinating Bidens (note pollen baskets)
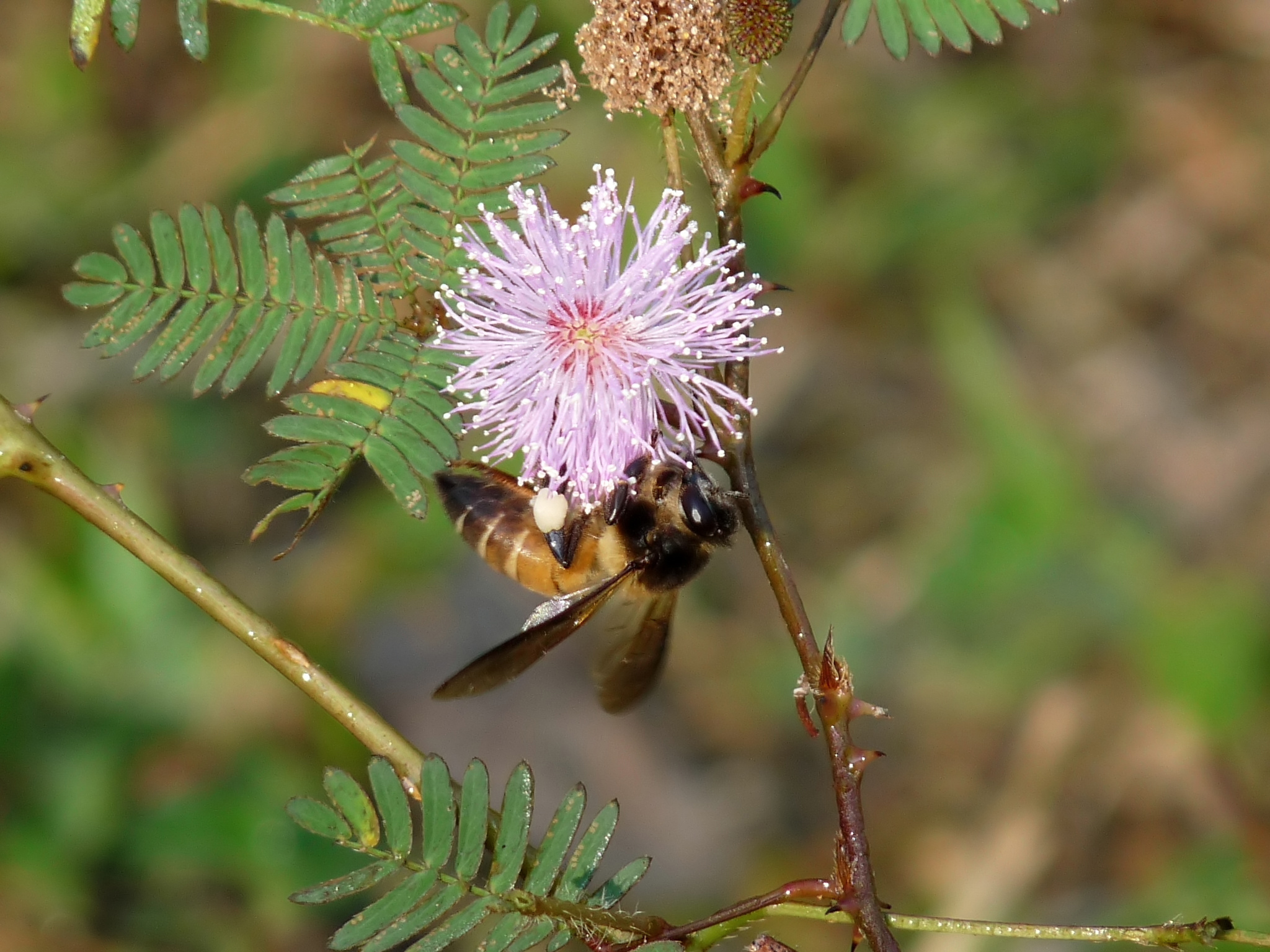
- Pollinating Mimosa pudica

Scientific classification
- Kingdom: Animalia
- Phylum: Arthropoda
- Clade: Pancrustacea
- Class: Insecta
- Order: Hymenoptera
- Family: Apidae
- Genus: Apis
- Subgenus: Megapis
- Species: A. dorsata

Binomial name
- Apis dorsata Fabricius, 1793
- Range of A. dorsata

= Apis dorsata =

Giant honey bee

Species of insect

Apis dorsata, the rock bee or giant honey bee, is a honey bee of South and Southeast Asia. They are typically around 17–20 mm (0.7–0.8 in) long and nests are mainly built in exposed places far off the ground, like on tree limbs, under cliff overhangs, and under buildings. These social bees are known for their aggressive defense strategies and vicious behavior when disturbed. Though the species is not domesticated, indigenous peoples have traditionally used it as a source of honey and beeswax, a practice known as honey hunting.

== Taxonomy and phylogeny ==
Apis dorsata belongs to the subgenus Megapis in the family Apidae. This honeybee is most closely related to A. mellifera (the western honey bee), A. cerana, and A. florea. There are a few hypotheses as to when A. dorsata diverged from A. florea and A. cerana, as it is unclear which divergence occurred first. Currently, the consensus hypothesis provides a family tree that claims that A. dorsata diverged from both A. cerana and A. florea at the same time.

=== Subspecies ===
Michael S. Engel identifies the following subspecies:

- A. d. dorsata (Indian giant honey bee), primarily from India
- A. d. binghami Cockerell (Indonesian giant honey bee), from Malaysia and Indonesia
- A. d. breviligula Maa (Philippine giant honey bee), from the Philippines

Recent research has removed A. d. laboriosa Fabricius (Himalayan giant honey bee) from inclusion within A. dorsata, as a separate species, with supporting evidence including a significant region of sympatry. A. laboriosa is hardly distinct morphologically from the nominate subspecies of dorsata (darker abdomen, longer thoracic hair) but has different housekeeping and swarming behavior, allowing it to survive at high altitudes. In addition, little gene flow has occurred between A. dorsata and A. laboriosa for millions of years; accordingly, some authors have previously classified it as a distinct species.

Likewise, the southeastern taxon A. d. binghami seems also to be potentially distinct. The limits of their ranges in Indochina and the possible distinctness of the geographically distant Philippines population require more study. However, the use of the taxonomic rank of "subspecies" is typical for geographically discrete populations, so the difference in opinion here is whether to recognize the rank of subspecies or not (i.e., they are distinct lineages; the dispute is over whether or not to call them "species").

== Description ==
=== Nests ===
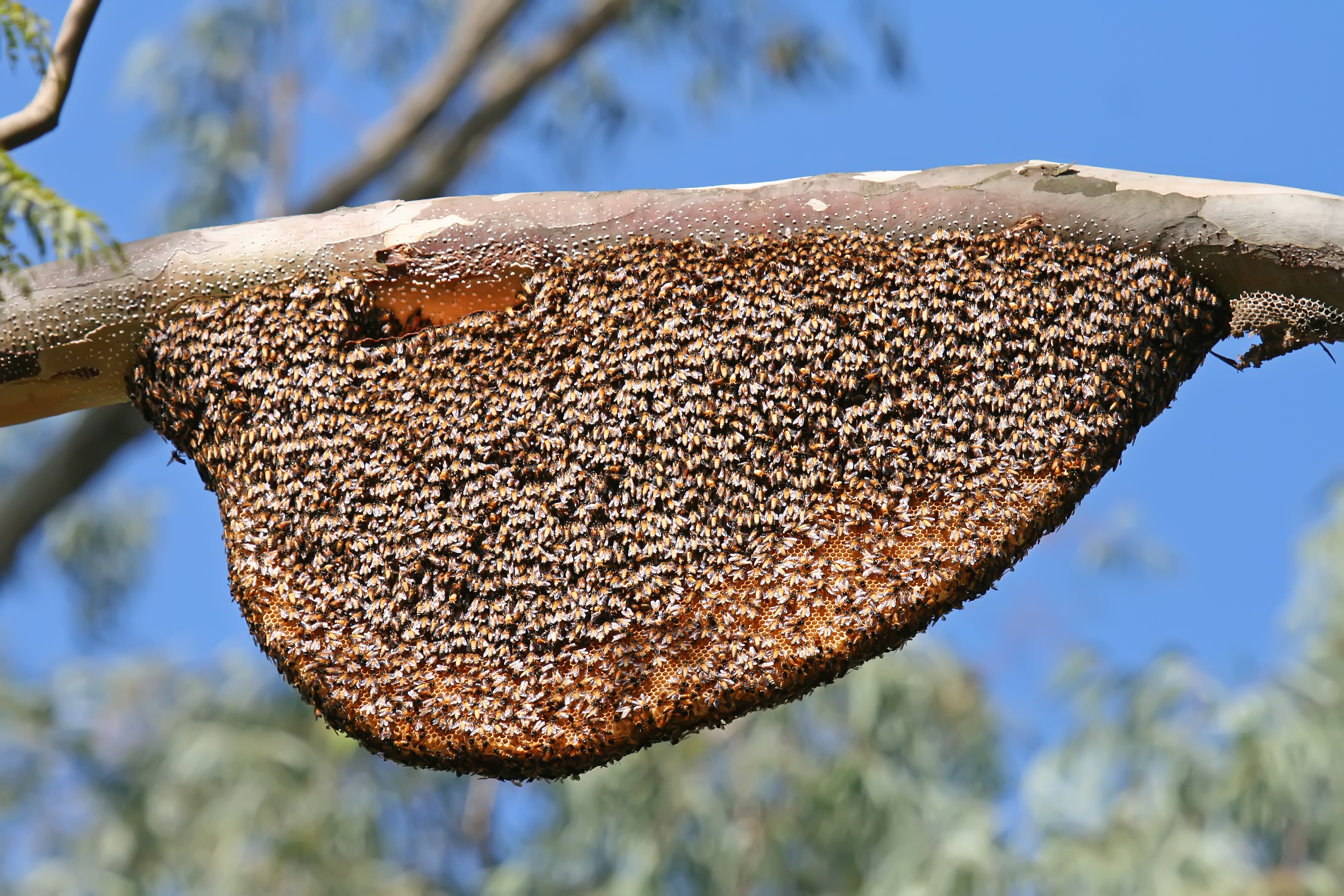
A nest of A. dorsata, consisting of a single exposed hanging comb: the bottom of the comb has a number of unoccupied hexagonal cells

A. dorsata differs from the other bees in its genus in nest design. Each colony consists of a single vertical comb made of workers' wax suspended from above, and the comb is typically covered by a dense mass of bees in several layers. The nests vary in size, reaching up to 1 meter. Each cell within the comb is hexagonal in shape. A. dorsata store their honey in an upper corner of the nest. The same size and type of cells are used to rear larvae. Nests are constructed in the open and in elevated locations, such as on urban buildings or tall trees. These bees rarely build nests on old or weak buildings for safety concerns. A. dorsata can form dense aggregations at one nesting site, sometimes with up to 200 colonies in one tree.

Each colony can have up to 100,000 bees and is separated by only a few centimeters from the other colonies in an aggregation. Some colonies also exhibit patterns of nest recognition, in which they return to the same nesting sites after migration.

== Distribution and habitat ==
A. dorsata is found from the Indian subcontinent to Southeast Asia. The greatest populations of A. dorsata are found in China, Malaysia, Indonesia, India, Pakistan, and Sri Lanka. In the Philippines, which used to have one of the greatest populations of A. dorsata, the populations have now become relatively rare due to deforestation and people's "mindsets" towards the bees. They mostly reside in tall trees in dense forests, but also build nests on urban buildings. These bees are tropical and in most places, they migrate seasonally. Individual colonies migrate between nesting sites during the transition from the rainy to dry seasons and occupy each nesting site for about 3–4 months at a time. Some recent evidence indicates these bees return to the same nest site, though most, if not all, of the original workers might be replaced in the process because workers usually live for less than two months. Furthermore, these bees build small combs that serve as temporary nests during their long migrations.

In Bornean rainforests, A. koschevnikovi and A. dorsata are the only honeybees that appear frequently at flowering canopy trees or baits. Even though they share most of the same rain forest habitat, they are still able to coexist. Their difference in size and tongue length help separate their resource use.

== Colony cycle ==
=== Colony initiation ===
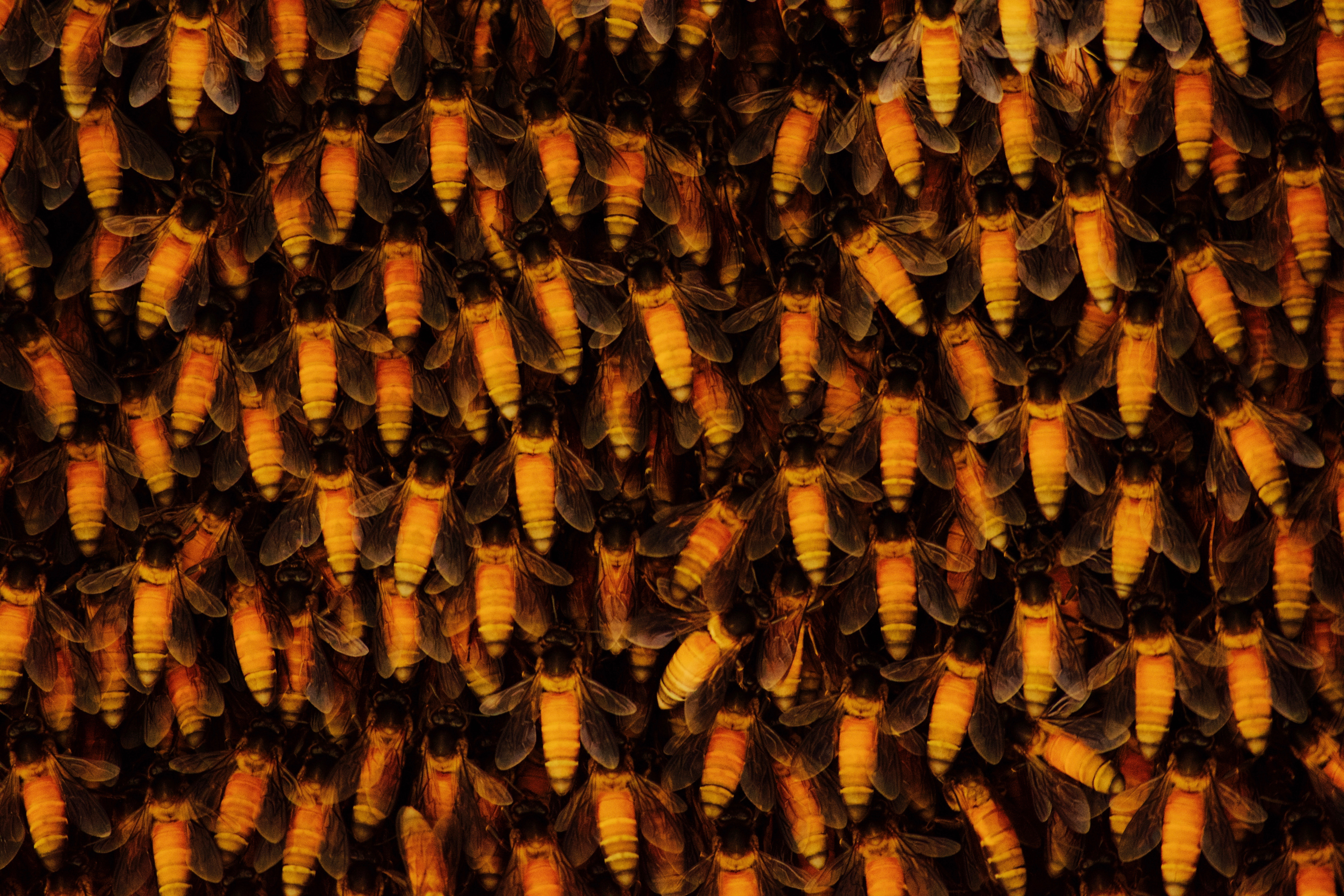
Close up of workers on a hive. The colony was being formed at the time of taking this image. Note the multiple layers of bees on top of each other.

There are two methods of reproductive swarming in which A. dorsata initiates new colonies, which usually occurs in October or November. The most common occurs when a queen flies away from the original nest slowly and a swarm of workers follows her. This new cluster of bees can be temporary, or they can permanently move to a new nesting site. The distance these bees travel is unknown, but some have been observed to travel about 500 meters away from the original nest. The second, rarer method is referred to as "budding." In budding, a group of workers leave the natal nest to form a new colony at a nesting site about 1 meter away from the original.

A non-reproductive method of colony initiation is absconding. Absconding refers to when an entire colony moves to a new location. As a colony is formed, multiple curtains, essentially layers, of bees are formed around the developing nest. Colony initiation is related to the migratory patterns of these bees.

=== Colony migration and decline ===
As a colony is initiated, the migration depends on foraging resources and predation risks. These bees travel to different sites depending on the blooming season of flowers. There are about 100,000 members in each colony and each colony resides in one nesting site for about 3–4 months at a time. Colonies tend to decline when resources, such as food, honey, and pollen, are depleted. Colonies decline during the rainy and summer seasons because of the instability of foraging sources due to climate change.

== Behavior ==
=== Mating ===
Drones and the queen fly away from the nest and mate on the wing. This is called nuptial flight. The drone flights are shorter than those of other Asian honeybee species. A. dorsata flights occur around dusk for 13 minutes on average. A. dorsata exhibit high degrees of polyandry, with many drones mating with the queen. In fact, A. d. fabricius has the highest levels of polyandry among all social insects. This may be attributed to the short duration of flight times for mating. During mating, the drones fly to drone congregation areas. Because there is more genetic relatedness within aggregations and because of the short duration and distance traveled during the mating flight, each aggregation is believed to have its own drone congregation area.

=== Communication ===
A. dorsata utilizes what is known as a dance language, also known as waggle dance, to communicate the location of food sources to other bees in the colony. The dance language indicates the distance, profitability, and direction of the food source. These social bees dance in the open and their dances produce sound signals of high intensity in the air. The orientation of the dancer's body points in the direction of the food source and the frequency of the sound indicates the profitability of the food source. A. dorsata produces silent dances, which usually involve visual cues during the day. They additionally produce sound with their dances in the nighttime, as they are the only bees of its genus that exhibit nocturnal foraging activity. Furthermore, there is some evidence that A. dorsata dances for migration purposes as well. Bees that have returned from the new nesting site perform dances that alert the colony of information such as the direction of the new nesting site.

=== Foraging ===
A. dorsata foragers can travel farther than A. cerana and A. florea, which travel to a maximum of 500 meters; however, 72% of observed A. dorsata foragers traveled no more than 400 meters.

== Kin selection ==
=== Worker policing ===
Unlike the rearing patterns of other species of the genus Apis, the worker and drone brood of A. dorsata are dispersed across in the same area and even share cells, and are not differentiated in separate locations of the nest. It would seem that worker policing makes mistakes often in correctly removing the drone brood since the drone brood are interspersed with worker brood, but every male raised comes from a queen-laid egg (not a worker-laid egg). Thus worker policing does indeed work within populations of these bees. Worker policing typically occurs through "egg-eating" or oophagy, but in the case of these bees, worker policing is directed at workers with ovaries since oophagy is hard to achieve, as worker-laid and queen-laid eggs are nearly identical in shape and size.

=== Genetic relatedness within and between aggregations ===
Since A. dorsata is known for its highly polyandrous activity, these bees exhibit a large number of colonies in close proximity to each other. Although the colonies within an aggregation are near each other, these colonies are not closely related. The queens of the colonies in an aggregation are not closely related, but the aggregation itself is more genetically linked than is expected by chance. Higher than expected genetic links may exist among colonies because they migrate together during their long distance migratory routes to the same nesting sites in the new location. This may also be attributed to short distance reproductive swarming methods and brief mating periods as well. Since it has been observed that rarely any queen-daughter relationships exist within aggregations, the "budding" hypothesis of colony initiation rarely occurs. Due to their long distance migratory patterns, the bees cause enough gene flow to occur between the colonies of different aggregations. There is distinct genetic differentiation between aggregations. In turn, the genetic relatedness between colonies within a single aggregation decreases.

=== Nest recognition and fidelity ===
A. dorsata is better than many of its relatives at avoiding drifting, an event when bees return to the wrong colonies after foraging. A. dorsata tends to form dense aggregations, contributing to the high nest fidelity and recognition amongst these bees. These bees usually return to their natal nests because this behavior results in higher fitness. If drifting were common, robbing bees and parasites could spread quickly through colonies. The high fidelity to the natal nests also leads to the aggressive behavior of A. dorsata bees. They aggressively attack workers from colonies that are not their own. If workers and queens do not return to the same colony, they have a high chance of getting killed because the other colony views them as potential robbers or carriers of disease. Some colonies even return to exactly the same nesting sites after their seasonal migrations.

== Interactions with other species ==
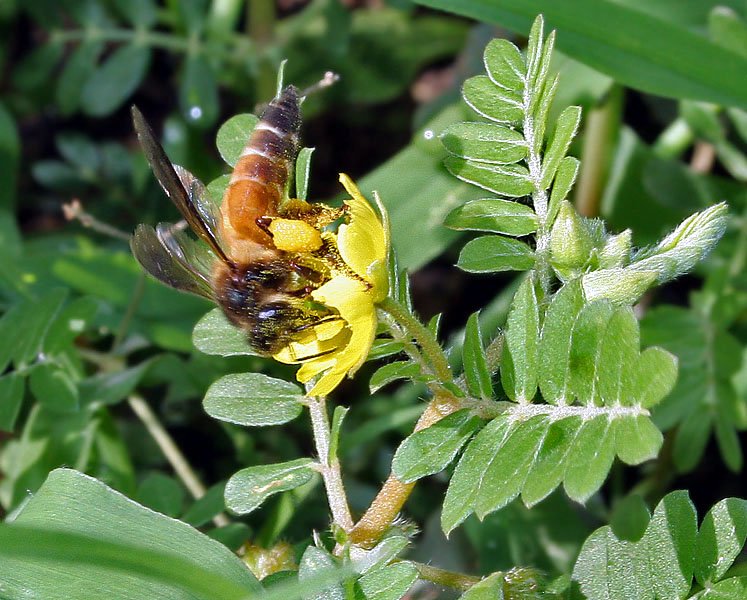
A. dorsata on Tribulus terrestris in Hyderabad, India

=== Parasites ===
Like other honeybees, A. dorsata is regularly afflicted by parasitic mites. The parasitic mite associated with A. dorsata is Tropilaelaps clareae, which needs brood to reproduce and is predominantly found in the male brood of the colony. A. dorsata is thought to be the original host of this parasite. Since A. dorsata engages in brood-less migration, as is true for all other Apis species, this reduces infestation by this parasitic mite. Although rarely seen, some experimental evidence has shown that A. dorsata exhibits a specialized grooming behavior as a defense mechanism to remove parasites. The grooming behavior involves intense shaking of the body and auto-grooming with the legs.

=== Defense against predators ===
Since the nests of A. dorsata are exposed and accessible to predators, these giant honeybees exhibit strong and aggressive defense strategies. Their predators include wasps, hornets, birds, and human bee-hunters. Their defense strategies typically include physical contact, especially when they face attacks from wasps. These giant honeybees utilize a method called "heat balling," in which they heat their thoraces to a temperature of 45 °C, which is lethal to wasps.

Another method A. dorsata utilizes against wasps is referred to as "shimmering" behavior or "defense waving". Bees in the outer layer thrust their abdomens 90° in an upward direction and shake them in a synchronous way. This may be accompanied by stroking of the wings. The signal is transmitted to nearby workers that also adopt the posture, thus creating a visible — and audible — "ripple" effect across the face of the comb, in an almost identical manner to an audience wave at a crowded stadium. These wave-like patterns repel wasps that get too close to the nests of these bees and serve to confuse the wasp. In turn, the wasp cannot fixate on capturing one bee or getting food from the bees' nest, so the wasp will seek to find easier prey and leave the nest alone. Shimmering appears to be an evolutionary successful behavior for group living amongst social bees.

Studies have also provided evidence that these bee colonies aggregate in defense. If one part of the nest is directly threatened by a bird, a signal (still unknown as to how) gets relayed to the rest of the colony so that all of them help in the defense, even if they are not directly threatened.

=== Human importance ===
Since large amounts of honey (up to 45 kilograms) can be stored in the nests of A. dorsata, many people frequently harvest their nests. Honey represents a livelihood for some of these people as it can provide them with an important source of income. However, deforestation, urbanization, pesticides, and honey hunting have threatened local populations of bees and their honey. These bees are known to be aggressive, and they have the potential to viciously sting humans. At least one fatal defensive attack on a human has been reported.

==== Rafter beekeeping ====
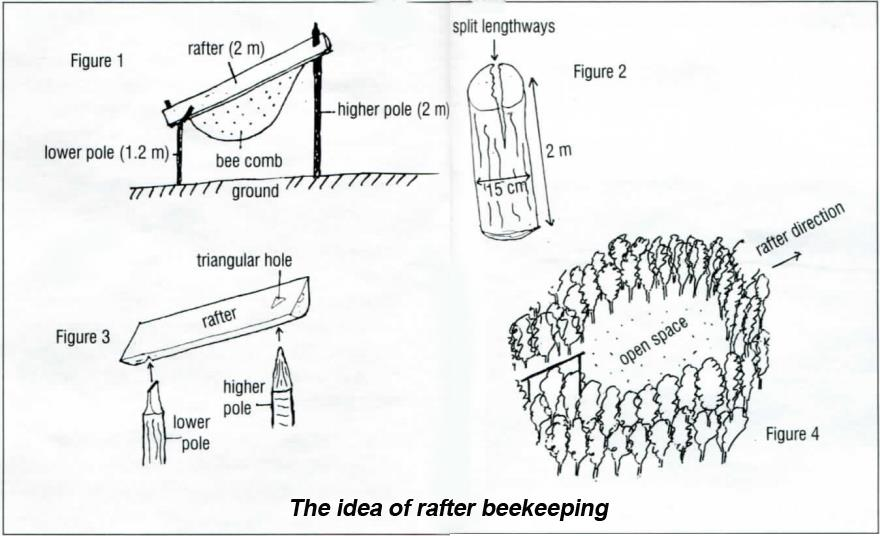
Rafter beekeeping technique used with A. dorsata

In some Melaleuca forests of southern Vietnam, people use a traditional method of collecting honey and wax from A. dorsata colonies. This method of "rafter beekeeping" was first reported in 1902. A similar method is practiced in the Songkhla Province in Thailand.

According to Vietnamese sociologists, in the early 19th century, honey hunting or raftering was the most important occupation of the people who lived in the Melaleuca forest swamp. At that time, people paid taxes to the government in exchange for living in the forest. Beeswax was used to pay the tax and for making candles, and was sold to visiting ships from Hainan, China.

Between 1945 and 1975, the forests were devastated first by wars, and then by forest clearing for wood and agricultural purposes. As a consequence, rafter beekeeping dramatically decreased in the area. The technique is still used today at the state farm of Song Trem in U Minh District. According to a survey, about 96 beekeepers are in the area. In 1991, they harvested 16,608 litres of honey and 747 kg of wax.
