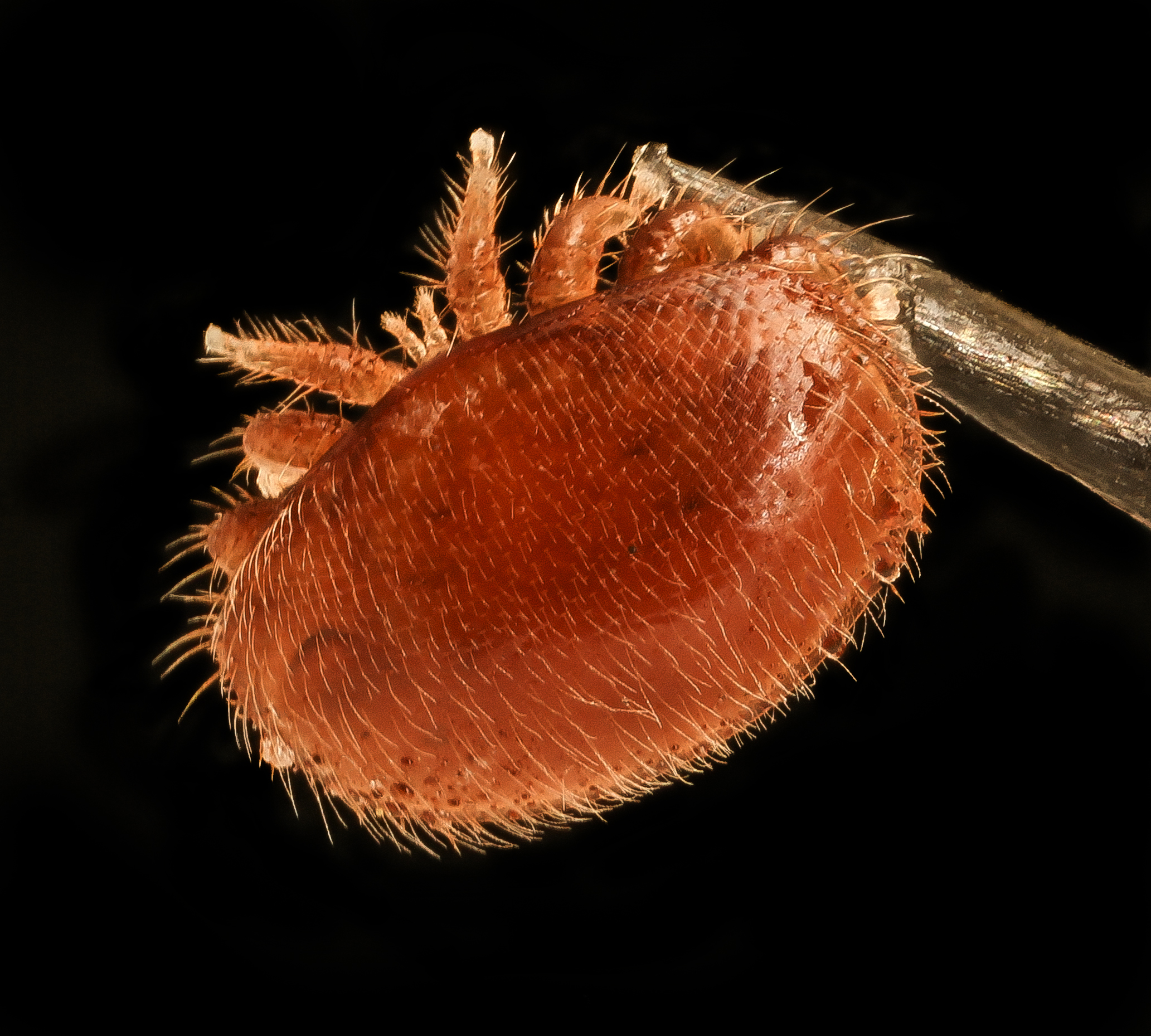

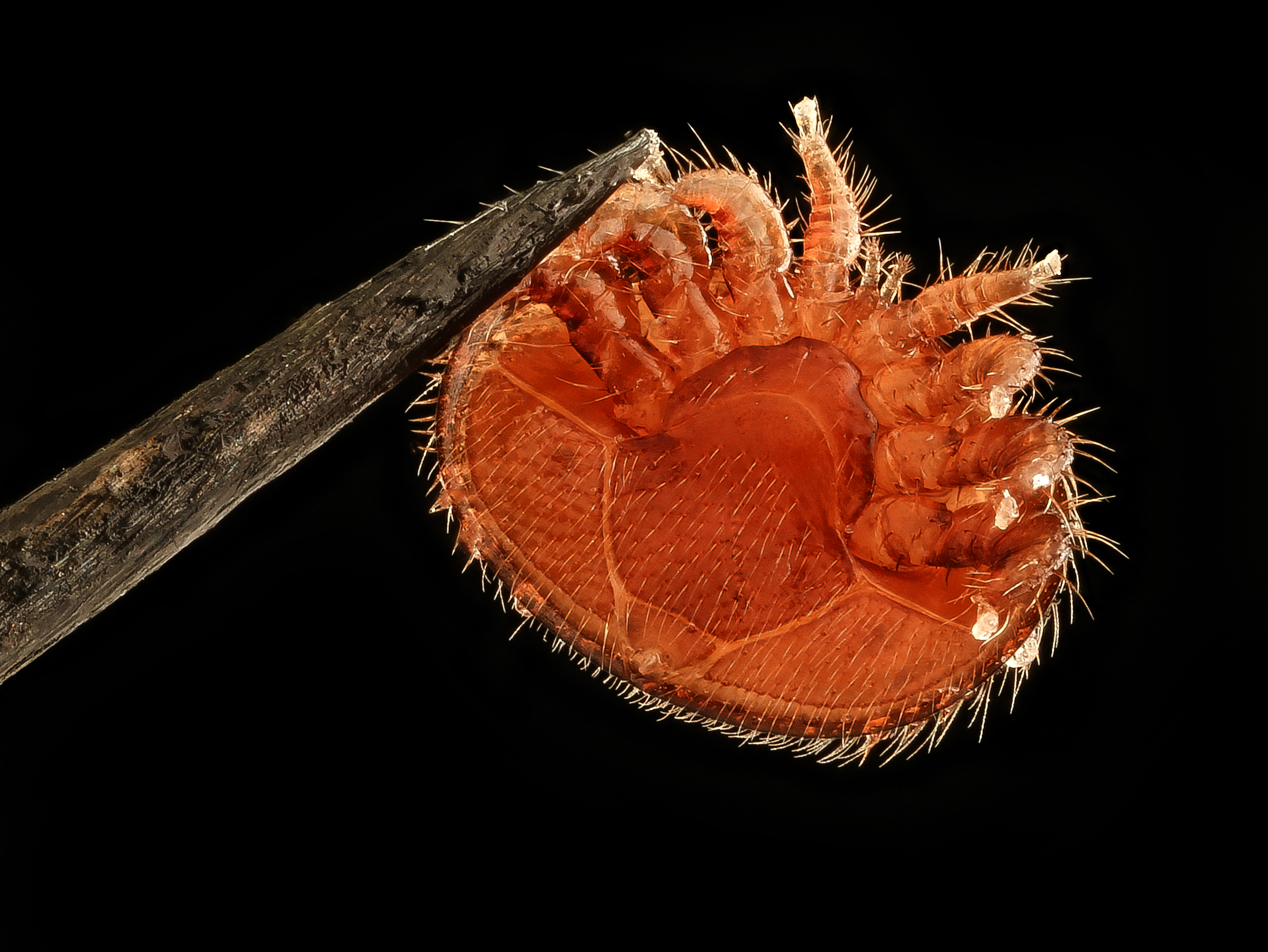
- Varroa destructor in dorsal (top) and ventral (lower) views

Scientific classification
- Kingdom: Animalia
- Phylum: Arthropoda
- Subphylum: Chelicerata
- Class: Arachnida
- Order: Mesostigmata
- Family: Laelapidae
- Subfamily: Varroinae; Delfinado & Baker, 1974
- Genus: Varroa; Oudemans, 1904

Species
- Varroa destructor Varroa jacobsoni Varroa rindereri Varroa underwoodi

= Varroa =

Genus of mites

Varroa is a genus of parasitic mesostigmatan mites associated with honey bees, originally placed into its own family, Varroidae, but later revised as a subfamily. The genus was named for Marcus Terentius Varro, a Roman scholar and beekeeper. The condition of a honeybee colony being infested with Varroa mites is called varroosis (also, incorrectly, varroatosis).

Varroa mites, but especially the species Varroa destructor, are recognised as the biggest pest to honeybees worldwide due to their ability to transmit diseases such as deformed wing virus (or DWV) to larval or pupating bees, resulting in death or severe deformity of the pupae.

== Species ==
The genus Varroa contains four species:

- Varroa destructor Anderson & Trueman, 2000 – a virulent parasite that infests its natural host, Apis cerana (Asian honey bees), in mainland Asia and Apis mellifera (western honey bee) worldwide.
- Varroa jacobsoni Oudemans, 1904 – a relatively benign parasite of Apis cerana.
- Varroa rindereri de Guzman & Delfinado-Baker, 1996
- Varroa underwoodi Delfinado-Baker and Aggarwal, 1987

== History and behavior ==
Varroa mites feed off the fat body tissue of adult, pupal, and larval honey bees, and may carry viruses that are particularly damaging to the bees (e.g., deformed wings, and IAPV), and accordingly they have been implicated in colony collapse disorder. Research has indicated that alone, neither Varroa mites nor deformed wing virus is particularly deadly, yet together they can pose a great risk to colonies.

Varroa mites were first discovered in Java in about 1904, but are now present in all honey bee populations worldwide, with a few minor exceptions. They were discovered in the United States in 1987, in New Zealand in 2000, and in the United Kingdom in 1992. They are said to be absent in few isolated regions of the United Kingdom such as Isle of Man and Isle of Colonsay. Because of the lack of Varroa in Isle of Man, the EU made a decision (in Feb. 2015) which allowed the Isle of Man to block the importation of all bee-related supplies.

Australia was said to be free of Varroa until a routine inspection at the Port of Newcastle on 22 June 2022 detected an infestation. Eradication is unlikely because no other introduction elsewhere in the world has been eradicated. On 9 November 2023, ABC News reported that researchers have predicted the extinction of feral bees in Australia within three years because of the spreading Varroa mite infestation.

== Varroosis ==
The infestation and subsequent parasitic disease caused by mites in the genus Varroa is called varroosis. Sometimes, the incorrect names varroatosis or varroasis are used. A parasitic disease name must be formed from the taxonomic name of the parasite and the suffix -osis as provided in the Standardised Nomenclature by the World Association for the Advancement of Veterinary Parasitology. For example, the World Organisation for Animal Health (OIE) uses the name varroosis in the OIE Terrestrial Manual.

== Treatments ==
The chemical treatment of Varroa mites in common beehives typically uses an alcohol wash which causes significant consequential damage to the honey bee population or the use of organic acids such as oxalic acid which is harmful to the mite but not the honey bee. Best results are obtained during periods of low or no brooding given the difficulty of applying medication to the brood and is often dispersed through a small vaporiser to distribute the acid within the hive. Commercial treatments such as Apistan and Apivar are commonly used as well.

== Resistance ==
Some honey bee strains have been bred to be resistant to Varroa, through Varroa sensitive hygiene (VSH) behavior, enabling them to detect reproducing varroa mites and diseased pupae within capped cells, which are then uncapped and the pupae removed.

Bee-breeding efforts to develop resistance against Varroa are ongoing. The USDA has developed a line of bees that uses Varroa-sensitive hygiene to remove reproductive mites. This line is now being distributed to beekeepers to be used as part of their integrated pest management programs.
