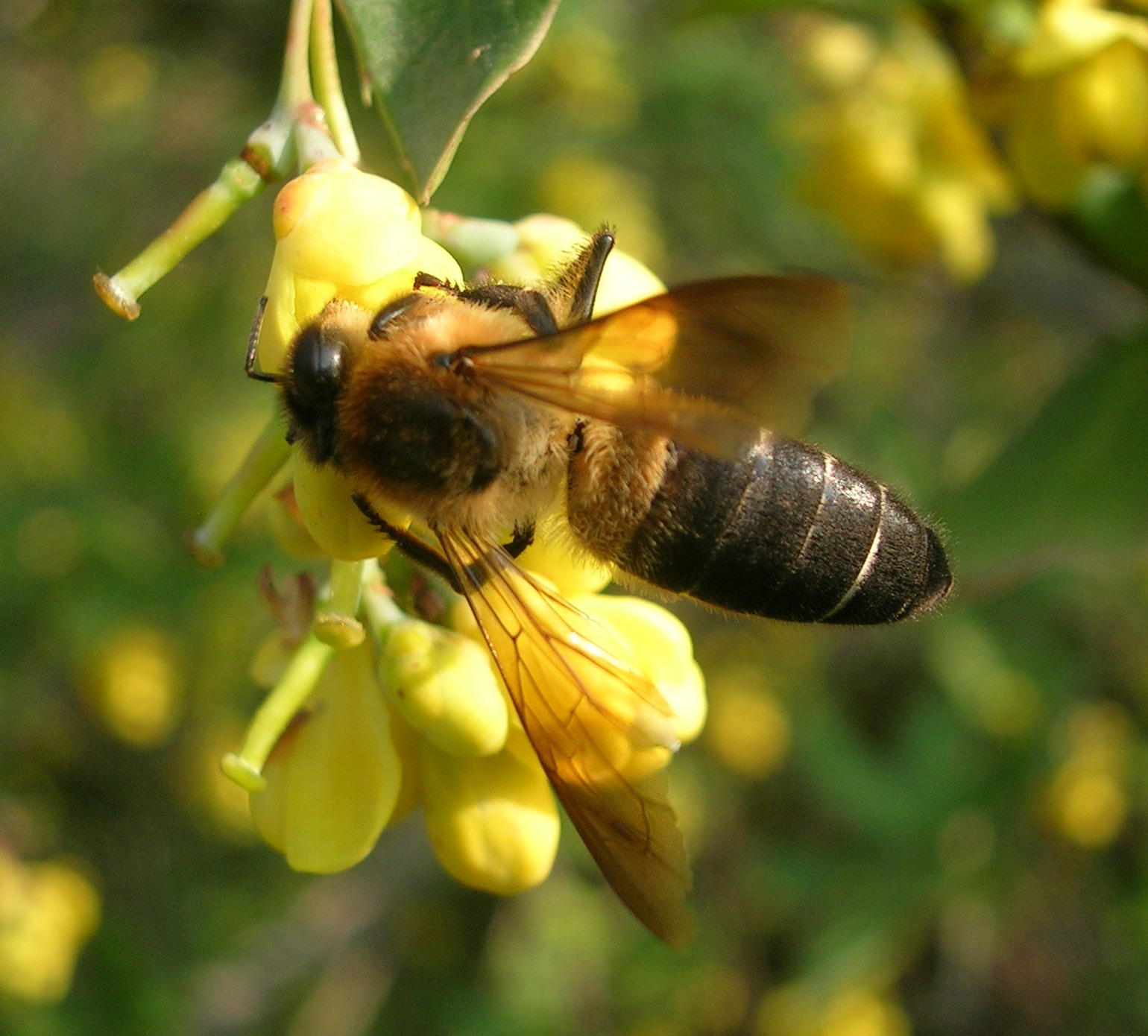

Scientific classification
- Kingdom: Animalia
- Phylum: Arthropoda
- Class: Insecta
- Order: Hymenoptera
- Family: Apidae
- Genus: Apis
- Species: A. laboriosa

Binomial name
- Apis laboriosa Smith, 1871

= Apis laboriosa =

Himalayan giant honey bee

Species of insect

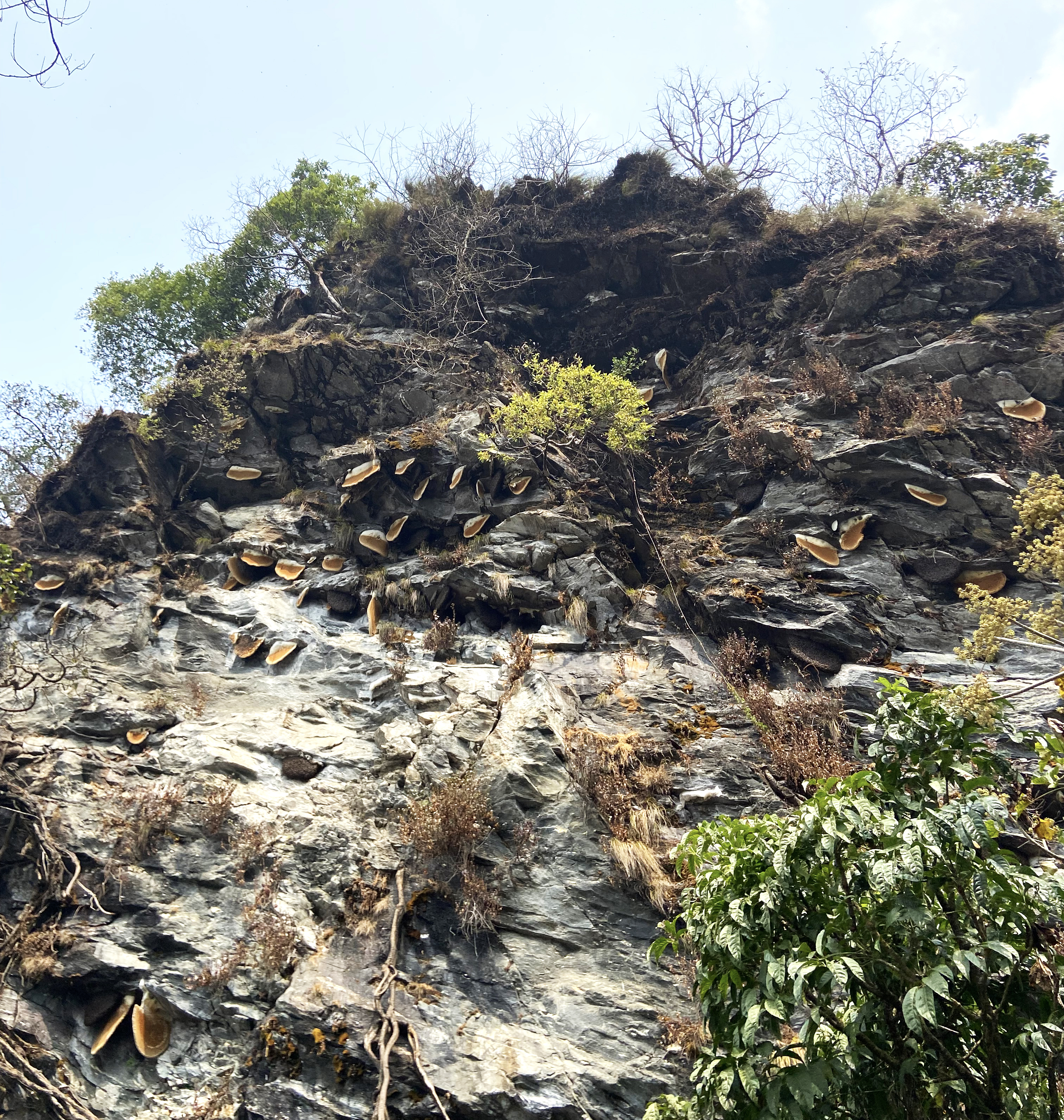
A honeycomb colony of A. laboriosa on a vertical rockface in the Himalayas of Sikkim, India

Apis laboriosa or Himalayan giant honey bee, is the world's largest honey bee; single adults can measure up to 3.0 cm (1.2 in) in length. Before 1980, Apis laboriosa was considered to be a subspecies of the widespread Apis dorsata, the giant honey bee, but in 1980 and for almost 20 years thereafter it was elevated to the rank of a separate species. It was classified once again as a subspecies of Apis dorsata by Michael S. Engel in 1999, but was confirmed as a full species in 2020 on the basis of co-occurrence with Apis dorsata at many sites with no sign of interbreeding. It is highly adapted to its highland habitat in behavior.

== Taxonomy ==
Recent research has removed laboriosa from inclusion within A. dorsata, as a separate species, with supporting evidence including a significant region of sympatry. A. laboriosa is hardly distinct morphologically from the nominate subspecies of dorsata (darker abdomen, longer thoracic hair) but has different housekeeping and swarming behavior, allowing it to survive at high altitudes. In addition, little gene flow has occurred between A. dorsata and A. laboriosa for millions of years; accordingly, some authors had previously classified it as a distinct species.

== Distribution ==
Limited largely to the Himalayas, it is the largest species in the genus Apis. It is found in the mountainous regions of Bhutan, the Chinese province of Yunnan, India, Nepal, Myanmar, Laos, and Vietnam. It mostly nests at altitudes between 2,500 and 3,000 m (8,200 and 9,800 ft), building very large nests under overhangs on the southwestern faces of vertical cliffs. One nest can contain as much as 60 kg (130 lb) of honey. The bees forage at altitudes of up to 4,100 m (13,500 ft). The term "Himalayan honey bee" is sometimes used more informally for any of the four types of honey bees that are found in the Himalayan region; A. cerana, A. florea, A. dorsata and A. laboriosa.

A significant portion of the range of A. laboriosa overlaps with that of yellow-rumped honeyguide (Indicator xanthonotus), a small sparrow-like bird that chiefly feeds on the beeswax. Because of this relationship between the two species, yellow-rumped honeyguides are often seen in the vicinity of A. laboriosa colonies in the Himalayas.

== Cultural significance ==
There are three types of A. laboriosa honey: spring or red honey that is created from flowers at higher altitudes, spring honey created from flowers at mid and lower altitudes, and autumn honey is created from any site. Red honey has an intoxicating effect and various relaxing qualities that decrease over storage. It is not consumed locally as it is valuable, and honey hunters prefer to sell it at a high price. As hive bees are not kept at such high altitudes, A. laboriosa is the only bee to produce this honey. The wholesale price of the red honey is about five times the price of regular honey from A. mellifera or A. cerana and large amounts of it are exported from Nepal to Japan, Korea, and Hong Kong. The red honey is prized for its purported medicinal value and intoxicating qualities which are attributed to the grayanotoxin present in the nectar collected from white rhododendrons (Rhododendron spp.). The Gurung people in Nepal are renowned for their use of this mad honey, both for its medicinal and hallucinogenic properties.

== Additional reading ==
- Ahmad Farooq, Joshi, S. R.; Gurung, M. B. (2003): "The Himalayan Cliff Bee Apis laboriosa and the Honey Hunters of Kaski: Indigenous Honeybees of the Himalayas" http://books.icimod.org/index.php/search/publication/124. 1: 52.
- Ahmad Farooq (2007): The Importance of honey bees. https://web.archive.org/web/20080116042803/http://www.bees4livelihood.icimod.org/home/?q=node%2F103
- Underwood B.A. (1990) Time of drone flight of Apis laboriosa Smith in Nepal. Apidologie 21, 501–504.doi:10.1051/apido:19900602
- Underwood B.A. (1990) Seasonal nesting cycle and migration patterns of the Himalayan honey bee Apis laboriosa. Natl. Geogr. Res. 6, 276–290.
- Woyke J., Wilde J., Wilde M. (2001) A scientific note on Apis laboriosa winter nesting and brood rearing in the Himalayas. Apidologie 32, 601–602. doi:10.1051/apido:2001104
