= List of compounds with carbon number 16 =

This is a partial list of molecules that contain 16 carbon atoms.

Chemical formula	Synonyms	CAS number
C_{16}H_{6}Br_{4}N_{2}O_{2}	c.i. vat blue 5	2475-31-2
C_{16}H_{9}BrN_{2}O_{2}	c.i. vat blue 3	6492-73-5
C_{16}H_{10}	aceanthrylene	202-03-9
C_{16}H_{10}	acephenanthrylene	201-06-9
C_{16}H_{10}	aceplaidylene	194-32-1
C_{16}H_{10}	fluoranthene	206-44-0
C_{16}H_{10}	pyrene	129-00-0
C_{16}H_{10}N_{2}O_{2}	c.i. vat blue 1	482-89-3
C_{16}H_{10}N_{2}O_{2}	indigo blue	12626-73-2
C_{16}H_{10}N_{2}O_{4}	dibenzoylfuroxan	6635-54-7
C_{16}H_{11}ClN_{4}	estazolam	29975-16-4
C_{16}H_{11}N_{3}O_{7}	naphthalene picric acid	29972-02-9
C_{16}H_{12}ClFN_{2}O	fludiazepam	3900-31-0
C_{16}H_{12}ClNO_{3}	benoxaprofen	51234-28-7
C_{16}H_{12}Cl_{2}N_{2}O_{2}	lormetazepam	848-75-9
C_{16}H_{12}FN_{3}O_{3}	flunitrazepam	1622-62-4
C_{16}H_{12}Ge	diethynyldiphenylgermane	1675-59-8
C_{16}H_{12}N_{7}	tetramethylammonium hexacyanotrimethylenecyclopropanide	89187-04-2
C_{16}H_{12}O_{3}	anisindione	117-37-3
C_{16}H_{12}O_{4}	Several molecules	-
C_{16}H_{12}O_{5}	Several molecules	-
C_{16}H_{12}O_{6}	Several molecules	-
C_{16}H_{12}O_{7}	Several molecules	-
C_{16}H_{12}Si	diphenyldiethynylsilane	1675-57-6
C_{16}H_{13}ClN_{2}O	mazindol	22232-71-9
C_{16}H_{13}ClFNO_{3}	Flamprop	58667-63-3
C_{16}H_{13}ClN_{2}O_{2}	clobazam	22316-47-8
C_{16}H_{13}ClN_{2}O_{2}	temazepam	846-50-4
C_{16}H_{13}Cl_{2}NO_{3}	benzoylprop	22212-56-2
C_{16}H_{13}NO_{3}	benzalhippuric acid	1155-48-2
C_{16}H_{13}NO_{5}	normelicopidine	517-74-8
C_{16}H_{13}N_{3}O_{3}	methylnitrazepam	2011-67-8
C_{16}H_{13}O_{5}	Diosmetinidin	64670-94-6
C_{16}H_{13}O_{6}	Peonidin	134-01-0
C_{16}H_{13}O_{7}	Several molecules	-
C_{16}H_{14}Cl_{2}O_{3}	chlorobenzilate	510-15-6
C_{16}H_{14}N_{2}O	methaqualone	72-44-6
C_{16}H_{14}N_{2}O_{2}S	mefenacet	73250-68-7
C_{16}H_{14}O_{2}	benzyl cinnamate	103-41-3
C_{16}H_{14}O_{2}	cinnamyl benzoate	5320-75-2
C_{16}H_{14}O_{3}	benzoinacetate	574-06-1
C_{16}H_{14}O_{3}	ketoprofen	22071-15-4
C_{16}H_{14}O_{4}	diphenyl succinate	621-14-7
C_{16}H_{14}O_{5}	Several molecules	-
C_{16}H_{14}O_{6}	Several molecules	-
C_{16}H_{15}ClN_{2}	medazepam	2898-12-6
C_{16}H_{15}ClN_{2}OS	clotiazepam	33671-46-4
C_{16}H_{15}Cl_{2}NO_{2}	bulan	117-26-0
C_{16}H_{15}Cl_{3}O_{2}	methoxychlor	72-43-5
C_{16}H_{15}NO	cyheptamide	7199-29-3
C_{16}H_{15}NO_{2}	acetoacetyldiphenylamine	2540-31-0
C_{16}H_{16}	acepleiadane	518-02-5
C_{16}H_{16}N_{2}O_{2}	anisaldazine	2299-73-2
C_{16}H_{16}N_{2}O_{4}	desmedipham	13684-56-5
C_{16}H_{16}Np	neptunocene	
C_{16}H_{16}O_{3}	desoxyanisoin	120-44-5
C_{16}H_{16}O_{6}	cerulignone	493-74-3
C_{16}H_{16}Pu	plutonocene	
C_{16}H_{16}Si	diphenyldivinylsilane	17937-68-7
C_{16}H_{16}Th	thorocene	12702-09-9
C_{16}H_{16}U	uranocene	11079-26-8
C_{16}H_{17}BrN_{2}	zimelidine	56775-88-3
C_{16}H_{17}ClN_{2}O	tetrazepam	10379-14-3
C_{16}H_{17}NO_{3}	normorphine	466-97-7
C_{16}H_{18}N_{2}S	fenethazine	522-24-7
C_{16}H_{18}N_{2}O_{4}	difenoxuron	14214-32-5
C_{16}H_{19}BrN_{2}	bromopheniramine	86-22-6
C_{16}H_{19}ClN_{2}	chlorpheniramine	132-22-9
C_{16}H_{19}ClN_{2}O	carbinoxamine base	486-16-8
C_{16}H_{19}ClN_{2}O	rotoxamine	5560-77-0
C_{16}H_{19}N	diphenethylamine	6308-98-1
C_{16}H_{19}N	ethylbenzylamine	10479-25-1
C_{16}H_{19}N	lefetamine	7262-75-1
C_{16}H_{19}NO_{4}	benzoylecgonine	519-09-5
C_{16}H_{19}NO_{5}	meta-oxybenzoylecgonine	
C_{16}H_{19}N_{3}S	isothipendyl	482-15-5
C_{16}H_{19}N_{3}S	prothipendyl	303-69-5
C_{16}H_{20}ClN_{3}	chloropyramine	59-32-5
C_{16}H_{20}N_{2}	tetracyclopropylsuccinonitrile	19219-01-3
C_{16}H_{20}O_{6}P_{2}S_{3}	temefos	3383-96-8
C_{16}H_{21}NO_{2}	propranolol	525-66-6
C_{16}H_{21}NO_{3}	homatropine	87-00-3
C_{16}H_{21}NS_{2}	diethylthiambutene	86-14-6
C_{16}H_{21}N_{3}	tripelennamine	91-81-6
C_{16}H_{22}ClN_{3}	tripelennamine hydrochloride	154-69-8
C_{16}H_{22}N_{4}O	thonzylamine	91-85-0
C_{16}H_{22}O_{3}	homomenthyl salicylate	52253-93-7
C_{16}H_{22}O_{3}	homosalate	118-56-9
C_{16}H_{22}O_{3}Si_{3}	diphenyltetramethylcyclotrisiloxane	1693-51-2
C_{16}H_{22}O_{4}	dibutyl isophthalate	3126-90-7
C_{16}H_{22}O_{4}	dibutyl phthalate	84-74-2
C_{16}H_{22}O_{4}	diisobutyl terephthalate	18699-48-4
C_{16}H_{22}O_{4}	methyl abscisate	7200-31-9
C_{16}H_{22}O_{4}	pentyl benzyl succinate	119450-13-4
C_{16}H_{22}O_{11}	galactose pentaacetate	6763-46-8
C_{16}H_{23}NO_{2}	alphaprodin	77-20-3
C_{16}H_{23}NO_{2}	betaprodine	468-59-7
C_{16}H_{23}NO_{2}	ethoheptazine	77-15-6
C_{16}H_{23}NO_{2}	hexylcaine	532-77-4
C_{16}H_{23}NO_{2}	piperocaine	136-82-3
C_{16}H_{23}NO_{2}	properidine	561-76-2
C_{16}H_{23}NO_{6}	monocrotaline	315-22-0
C_{16}H_{23}N_{3}OS	buprofezin	69327-76-0
C_{16}H_{24}N_{2}	isoaminile	77-51-0
C_{16}H_{24}N_{2}O	oxymetazoline	1491-59-4
C_{16}H_{24}N_{2}O_{2}	molindone	7416-34-4
C_{16}H_{24}N_{10}O_{4}	aminophylline	317-34-0
C_{16}H_{24}O_{2}	phenylethyl octanoate	5457-70-5
C_{16}H_{24}O_{4}	torquatone	3567-96-2
C_{16}H_{25}NO_{2}	butethamate	14007-64-8
C_{16}H_{25}NO_{3}	thymoxamine	54-32-0
C_{16}H_{26}	pentaethylbenzene	605-01-6
C_{16}H_{26}	perhydropyrene	16291-77-3
C_{16}H_{26}N_{2}O_{2}	dimethocaine	94-15-5
C_{16}H_{26}N_{2}O_{3}	proxymetacaine	5875-06-9
C_{16}H_{26}N_{8}O_{9}	octaglycine	38416-68-1
C_{16}H_{26}O	decyloxybenzene	35021-67-1
C_{16}H_{27}FeO_{4}P	tributylphosphine iron tetracarbonyl	18474-82-3
C_{16}H_{28}	tricyclopentylmethane	3752-92-9
C_{16}H_{28}O	ambrox	65588-69-4
C_{16}H_{28}O	8-cyclohexadecanone	3100-36-5
C_{16}H_{28}O_{2}	ambrettolide	123-69-3
C_{16}H_{28}O_{2}	geranyl caproate	10032-02-7
C_{16}H_{28}O_{4}	dihexyl fumarate	19139-31-2
C_{16}H_{28}O_{4}	dihexyl maleate	105-52-2
C_{16}H_{29}Cl_{3}O_{2}	tetradecyl trichloroacetate	74339-52-9
C_{16}H_{30}	bicyclooctyl	6708-17-4
C_{16}H_{30}Cl_{2}O_{2}	tetradecyl dichloroacetate	83005-02-1
C_{16}H_{30}HgO_{4}	mercuric octanoate	28043-54-1
C_{16}H_{30}O	cyclohexadecanone	2550-52-9
C_{16}H_{30}O_{2}	citronellyl hexanoate	10580-25-3
C_{16}H_{30}O_{2}	palmitoleic acid	373-49-9
C_{16}H_{30}O_{3}	caprylic anhydride	623-66-5
C_{16}H_{30}O_{4}	dipentyl hexanedioate	14027-78-2
C_{16}H_{30}O_{4}	hexadecanedioic acid	505-54-4
C_{16}H_{30}O_{4}	monododecyl succinate	21668-03-1
C_{16}H_{31}BrO_{2}	tetradecyl bromoacetate	18992-01-3
C_{16}H_{31}ClO	palmitoyl chloride	112-67-4
C_{16}H_{31}ClO_{2}	tetradecyl chloroacetate	18277-86-6
C_{16}H_{31}N	hexadecanenitrile	629-79-8
C_{16}H_{31}O_{2}Tl	thallium hexadecanoate	33734-55-3
C_{16}H_{32}	cyclohexadecane	295-65-8
C_{16}H_{32}	hexadecene	26952-14-7
C_{16}H_{32}	tetraisobutylene	15220-85-6
C_{16}H_{32}O	hexadecanal	629-80-1
C_{16}H_{32}O_{2}	heptyl nonanoate	71605-85-1
C_{16}H_{32}O_{2}	hexadecanoic acid	57-10-3
C_{16}H_{32}O_{2}	nonyl heptanoate	98841-69-1
C_{16}H_{32}O_{2}	pentadecyl methanoate	66271-76-9
C_{16}H_{32}O_{2}	pentyl undecanoate	10484-11-4
C_{16}H_{32}O_{2}	propyl tridecanoate	88591-28-0
C_{16}H_{32}O_{2}	tridecyl propanoate	66271-77-0
C_{16}H_{32}O_{3}	hexadecaneperoxoic acid	7311-29-7
C_{16}H_{32}O_{5}	aleuritic acid	533-87-9
C_{16}H_{33}NO	hexadecanamide	629-54-9
C_{16}H_{34}	hexadecane	544-76-3
C_{16}H_{34}O	cetyl alcohol	124-29-8
C_{16}H_{34}OS	dioctyl sulfone	7726-20-7
C_{16}H_{34}OS	dioctyl sulfoxide	1986-89-6
C_{16}H_{34}O_{3}	diethylene glycol monododecyl ether	3055-93-4
C_{16}H_{34}S_{2}	dioctyl disulfide	822-27-5
C_{16}H_{35}O_{4}P	diethyl dodecyl phosphate	91776-68-0
C_{16}H_{36}BF_{4}N	tetrabutylammonium tetrafluoroborate	429-42-5
C_{16}H_{36}F_{6}NP	tetrabutylammonium hexafluorophosphate	3109-63-5
C_{16}H_{36}Ge	tetrabutylgermane	1067-42-1
C_{16}H_{36}N_{2}O_{3}	tetrabutylammonium nitrate	1941-27-1
C_{16}H_{36}O_{4}Si	tetrabutyl silicate	4766-57-8
C_{16}H_{36}O_{4}Ti	tetrabutoxytitanium	5593-70-4
C_{16}H_{36}P_{2}	tetrabutyldiphosphine	13904-54-6
C_{16}H_{40}D_{4}Si_{4}	octaethylcyclotetrasiloxane	1451-99-6
C_{16}H_{48}O_{8}Si_{8}	hexadecamethylcyclooctasiloxane	556-68-3
C_{16}H_{34}S	hexadecanethiol	2917-26-2

== See also ==
- Carbon number
- List of compounds with carbon number 15
- List of compounds with carbon number 17
