= List of compounds with carbon number 17 =

This is a partial list of molecules that contain 17 carbon atoms.

Chemical formula	Synonyms	CAS number
C_{17}H_{10}O	benzanthrone	82-05-3
C_{17}H_{11}Br_{2}NO_{2}	broxaldine	3684-46-6
C_{17}H_{12}ClF_{3}N_{2}O	halazepam	23092-17-3
C_{17}H_{12}ClNO_{2}S	fentiazac	18046-21-4
C_{17}H_{12}Cl_{2}N_{2}O	fenarimol	60168-88-9
C_{17}H_{12}Cl_{2}N_{4}	triazolam	28911-01-5
C_{17}H_{12}O_{6}	aflatoxin b1	1162-65-8
C_{17}H_{12}O_{7}	aflatoxin g1	1165-39-5
C_{17}H_{13}ClN_{2}O_{4}	quizalofop	76578-12-6
C_{17}H_{13}ClN_{4}	alprazolam	28981-97-7
C_{17}H_{13}F_{3}N_{2}O_{2}	triflubazam	22365-40-8
C_{17}H_{13}N_{3}O_{5}S_{2}	phthalylsulfathiazole	85-73-4
C_{17}H_{14}BrFN_{2}O_{2}	haloxazolam	59128-97-1
C_{17}H_{14}Cl_{2}N_{2}O_{2}	cloxazolam	24166-13-0
C_{17}H_{14}FeO	benzoylferrocene	1272-44-2
C_{17}H_{14}N_{2}	benzhydryl pyrazine	28217-87-0
C_{17}H_{14}O	distyryl ketone	538-58-9
C_{17}H_{14}O_{5}	coumafuryl	117-52-2
C_{17}H_{14}O_{6}	aflatoxin b2	7220-81-7
C_{17}H_{14}O_{7}	Several molecules	-
C_{17}H_{15}NO_{5}	melicopidine	475-91-2
C_{17}H_{15}NO_{5}	melicopine	568-01-4
C_{17}H_{15}O_{6}	Rosinidin	4092-64-2
C_{17}H_{15}O_{7}	Several molecules	-
C_{17}H_{16}BrNO_{4}	methylanthranilate	5391-70-8
C_{17}H_{16}Br_{2}O_{3}	bromopropylate	18181-80-1
C_{17}H_{16}ClN_{3}O	amoxapine	14028-44-5
C_{17}H_{16}Cl_{2}O_{3}	chloropropylate	5836-10-2
C_{17}H_{16}F_{3}NO_{2}	flutolanil	66332-96-5
C_{17}H_{16}O_{4}	dibenzyl malonate	15014-25-2
C_{17}H_{16}O_{4}	diphenylmethylene diacetate	54334-63-3
C_{17}H_{17}ClN_{6}O_{3}	zopiclone	43200-80-2
C_{17}H_{17}ClO_{6}	griseofulvin	126-07-8
C_{17}H_{17}Cl_{2}N 30	sertraline	79617-96-2
C_{17}H_{17}N_{2}	difenzoquat	49866-87-7
C_{17}H_{17}NO_{2}	apomorphine	58-00-4
C_{17}H_{18}F_{3}NO	fluoxetine	54910-89-3
C_{17}H_{18}	Gonane	4732-76-7
C_{17}H_{18}N_{2}O_{6}	nifedipine	21829-25-4
C_{17}H_{18}O_{2}	benzyl isoeugenol	120-11-6
C_{17}H_{19}ClN_{2}S	chlorpromazine	50-53-3
C_{17}H_{19}NO_{2}	mepronil	55814-41-0
C_{17}H_{19}NO_{3}	hydromorphone	466-99-9
C_{17}H_{19}NO_{3}	morphine	57-27-2
C_{17}H_{19}NO_{3}	norcodeine	467-15-2
C_{17}H_{19}NO_{3}	piperine	94-62-2
C_{17}H_{19}NO_{4}	oxymorphone	76-41-5
C_{17}H_{19}N_{3}	antazoline	91-75-8
C_{17}H_{19}N_{3}	mirtazapine	61337-67-5
C_{17}H_{20}BrNO	bromodiphenhydramine	118-23-0
C_{17}H_{20}ClNO	chlophedianol	791-35-5
C_{17}H_{20}Cl_{2}N_{2}S	chlorpromazine hydrochloride	69-09-0
C_{17}H_{20}N_{2}	norcyclizine	841-77-0
C_{17}H_{20}N_{2}O_{2}	tropicamide	1508-75-4
C_{17}H_{20}N_{2}S	promazine	58-40-2
C_{17}H_{20}N_{2}S	promethazine	60-87-7
C_{17}H_{20}N_{4}O_{6}	riboflavine	83-88-5
C_{17}H_{21}N	demelverine	13977-33-8
C_{17}H_{21}NO	diphenhydramine hydrochloride	147-24-0
C_{17}H_{21}NO	phenyltoloxamine	92-12-6
C_{17}H_{21}NO_{2}	apoatropine	500-55-0
C_{17}H_{21}NO_{2}	desomorphine	427-00-9
C_{17}H_{21}NO_{2}	napropamide	15299-99-7
C_{17}H_{21}NO_{3}	dihydromorphine	509-60-4
C_{17}H_{21}NO_{3}	galanthamine	357-70-0
C_{17}H_{21}NO_{4}	cocaine	50-36-2
C_{17}H_{21}NO_{4}	cocaine	668-19-9
C_{17}H_{21}NO_{4}	hyoscine	51-34-3
C_{17}H_{21}NO_{4}	pseudococaine	478-73-9
C_{17}H_{22}N_{2}O	doxylamine	469-21-6
C_{17}H_{22}N_{2}S	thenaldine	86-12-4
C_{17}H_{22}O_{2}	linalyl benzoate	126-64-7
C_{17}H_{22}O_{8}	fusarenon x	23255-69-8
C_{17}H_{23}NO	dextrorphan	125-73-5
C_{17}H_{23}NO	levorphanol	77-07-6
C_{17}H_{23}NO	racemorphan	297-90-5
C_{17}H_{23}NO_{3}	atropine	51-55-8
C_{17}H_{23}NO_{3}	hyoscyamine	101-31-5
C_{17}H_{23}NO_{3}	hyoscyamine hydrobromide	306-03-6
C_{17}H_{23}N_{3}O	pyriliamine	91-84-9
C_{17}H_{24}ClNO_{2}	butenachlor	87310-56-3
C_{17}H_{24}N_{2}O	dimethisoquin	86-80-6
C_{17}H_{24}N_{2}O_{2}	phenglutarimide	1156-05-4
C_{17}H_{24}O_{3}	cyclandelate	456-59-7
C_{17}H_{24}O_{3}	menthyl salicylate	89-46-3
C_{17}H_{24}O_{4}	hexyl benzyl succinate	119450-14-5
C_{17}H_{25}NO_{2}	alphameprodine	468-51-9
C_{17}H_{25}NO_{2}	betameprodine	468-50-8
C_{17}H_{25}NO_{2}	proheptazine	77-14-5
C_{17}H_{25}NO_{2}	trimeperidine	64-39-1
C_{17}H_{25}NO_{3}	cyclopentolate	512-15-2
C_{17}H_{25}NO_{3}	eucatropine	100-91-4
C_{17}H_{25}NO_{4}	buflomedil	55837-25-7
C_{17}H_{26}ClNO_{2}	butachlor	23184-66-9
C_{17}H_{26}ClNO_{2}	pretilachlor	51218-49-6
C_{17}H_{26}N_{2}O	phenampromide	129-83-9
C_{17}H_{26}N_{2}O_{4}S	sultopride	53583-79-2
C_{17}H_{27}MoO_{5}P	tributylphosphinemolybdenum pentacarbonyl	15680-62-3
C_{17}H_{27}MoO_{8}P	tributylphosphite molybdenum pentacarbonyl	21485-22-3
C_{17}H_{27}NO_{2}	venlafaxine	93413-69-5
C_{17}H_{27}NO_{3}	pramoxine	140-65-8
C_{17}H_{27}NO_{4}	metipranolol	22664-55-7
C_{17}H_{27}NO_{4}	nadolol	42200-33-9
C_{17}H_{28}N_{2}O	etidocaine	36637-18-0
C_{17}H_{28}N_{2}O_{2}	ambucetamide	519-88-0
C_{17}H_{28}N_{2}O_{2}	farmocaine	3772-42-7
C_{17}H_{28}N_{2}O_{2}	leucinocaine	92-23-9
C_{17}H_{28}N_{2}O_{3}	benoxinate	99-43-4
C_{17}H_{28}O_{2}	cedryl acetate	77-54-3
C_{17}H_{28}O_{2}	farnesyl acetate	29548-30-9
C_{17}H_{28}O_{2}	nerolidyl acetate	2306-78-7
C_{17}H_{28}O_{8}S_{4}	pentaerythritol tetrakis(3-mercaptopropionate)	7575-23-7
C_{17}H_{29}NO_{3}S	sethoxydim	74051-80-2
C_{17}H_{30}	cyclopentylbicyclohexyl	26447-22-3
C_{17}H_{30}N_{2}	tributylmethyl pyrazine	116660-18-5
C_{17}H_{30}O_{2}	geranyl heptanoate	73019-15-5
C_{17}H_{31}Cl_{3}O_{2}	pentadecyl trichloroacetate	74339-53-0
C_{17}H_{32}O	cycloheptadecanone	3661-77-6
C_{17}H_{32}O_{2}	methyl palmitelaidate	10030-74-7
C_{17}H_{33}N	margaronitrile	5399-02-0
C_{17}H_{33}NS	hexadecyl isothiocyanate	4426-87-3
C_{17}H_{34}	cycloheptadecane	295-97-6
C_{17}H_{34}O	heptadecanal	629-90-3
C_{17}H_{34}O_{2}	heptadecanoic acid	506-12-7
C_{17}H_{34}O_{2}	hexadecyl methanoate	4113-08-0
C_{17}H_{34}O_{2}	isoamyl laurate	6309-51-9
C_{17}H_{34}O_{2}	isopropyl myristate	110-27-0
C_{17}H_{34}O_{2}	propyl tetradecanoate	14303-70-9
C_{17}H_{36}	heptadecane	629-78-7
C_{17}H_{36}O_{3}S	hexadecyl methanesulfonate	20779-14-0
C_{17}H_{37}NO_{2}Si_{2}	proline ditbdms	107715-91-3
C_{17}H_{39}NO_{2}SSi_{2}	methionine ditbdms	107715-92-4
C_{17}H_{39}NO_{2}Si_{2}	valine ditbdms	107715-89-9

== See also ==
- Carbon number
- List of compounds with carbon number 16
- List of compounds with carbon number 18
