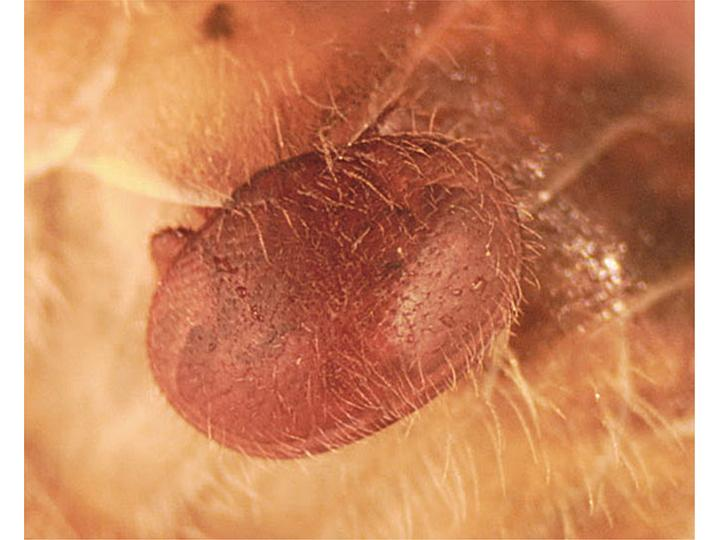

Scientific classification
- Kingdom: Animalia
- Phylum: Arthropoda
- Subphylum: Chelicerata
- Class: Arachnida
- Order: Mesostigmata
- Family: Laelapidae
- Genus: Varroa
- Species: V. jacobsoni

Binomial name
- Varroa jacobsoni Oudemans, 1904

= Varroa jacobsoni =

Species of mite

Varroa jacobsoni is a species of mite that parasitises Apis cerana (Asian honey bees). The more damaging Varroa destructor was previously included under the name V. jacobsoni, but the two species can be separated on the basis of the DNA sequence of the cytochrome oxidase I gene in the mitochondrial DNA.

== Biogeography ==
Prior to recent studies, V. jacobsoni was considered homogeneous; however, current research has detected genetic variance among populations by using genetic markers. This finding has led to the belief that V. jacobsoni was introduced to the Americas multiple times. The hosts switching between the eastern A. cerana and the western A. mellifera is the major factor that broadens the pathological transmission of V. jacobsoni. It has spread worldwide with the exception of Australia and central Africa.

== Evolution ==
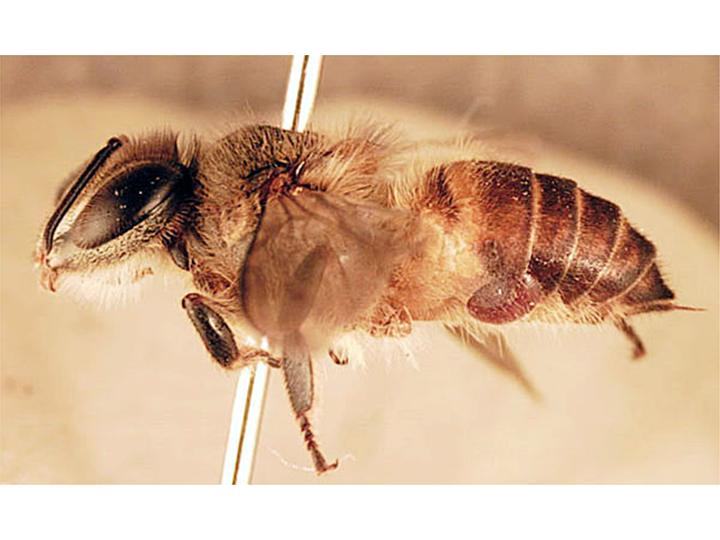
An adult Varroa jacobsoni feeding on a honey bee.

At least 30 lineages of mites have specialised in living with bees. Most mite species associated with bee nests are either saprophagous or cleptophagous. Saprophagous mites eat hive debris, especially parts with fungi growth. Cleptophagous mites eat pollen and other nutrients stored by bees. The few that have evolved to become parasitic appear to have arisen from predatory lineages. The family Laelapidae has 12 genera that prey on stingless bees (Meliponinae). Thus, the brood parasites (Varroidae) of honeybees (Apinae) appear to have evolved from the Laelapidae.

== Life cycle ==
The lifecycle of V. jacobsoni in A. cerana begins with a mature mated female entering a larval cell of a honey bee. Once the cell is capped, the adult female mite hides for five days inside the larval food near the bottom of the cell. After about five hours, the mite is released from the food, where it then begins feeding on the host's haemolymph. After 60 hours, the adult female mite lays its first egg on the wall of the cell. Unfertilised mite eggs produce male offspring, that are able to mate with the female offspring. The adult mated female then emerges from the cell with the emerging bee. Once mites are released to the environment, they are transferred to other bees through close contact. The adult female mites then feed through the intersegmental membrane on honeybee haemolymph. The cycle is then completed.

== Chemical resistance to acaricides ==
Acaricides are pesticides that kill members of the Acari group, which includes ticks and mites. Acaricides were at one time an effective method in regulating the transmission of V. jacobsoni in honey bees, but the buildup of residues in acaricide-resistant strains have decreased the effectiveness of mite control in honey bees. Among those acaricides used are acrinathrin, amitraz, bromopropylate, chlordimeform, coumaphos, flumethrin, and fluvalinate.

== Images ==
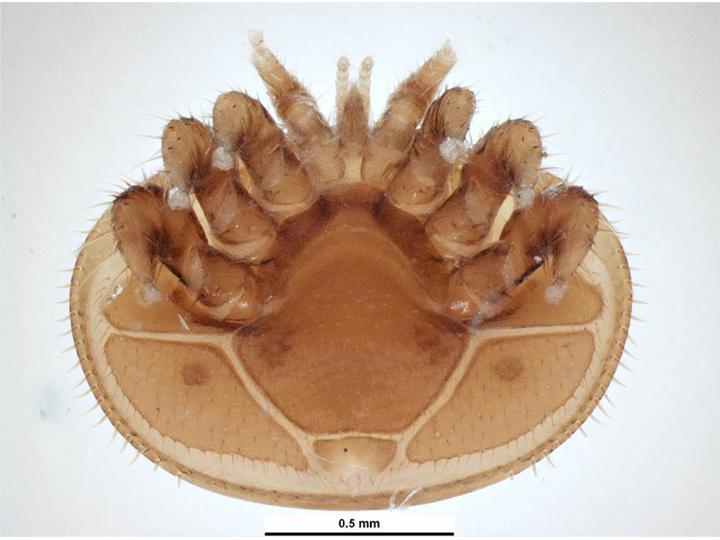
ventral view

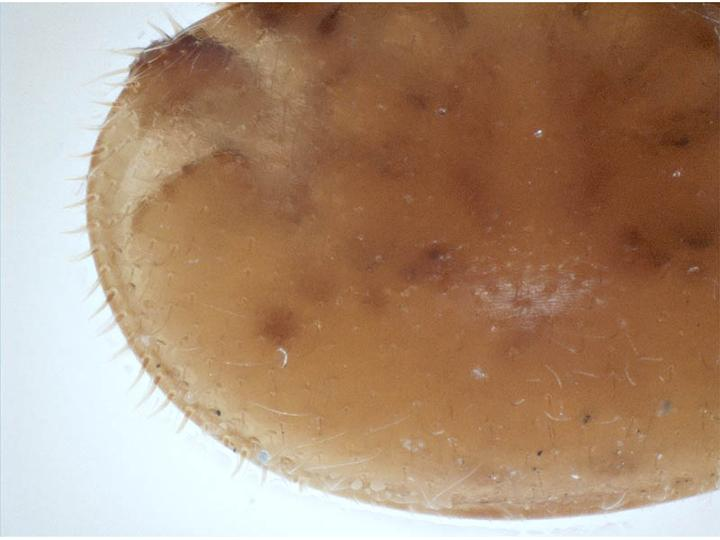
Dorsal (closeup)

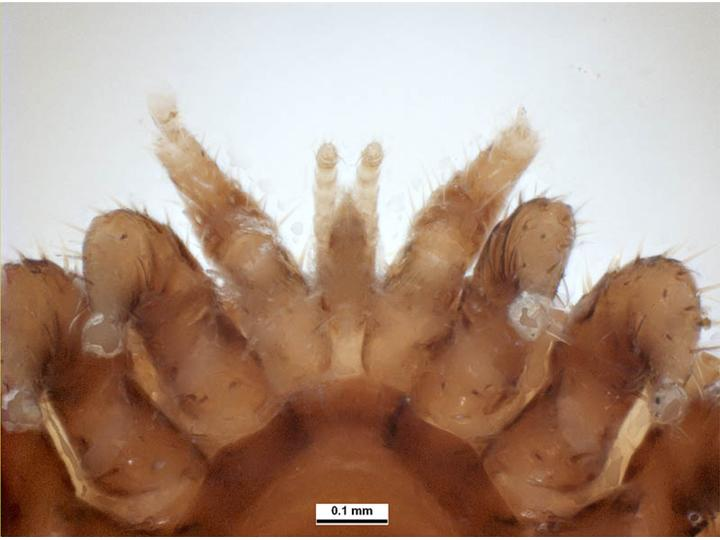
Mouthparts (closeup)

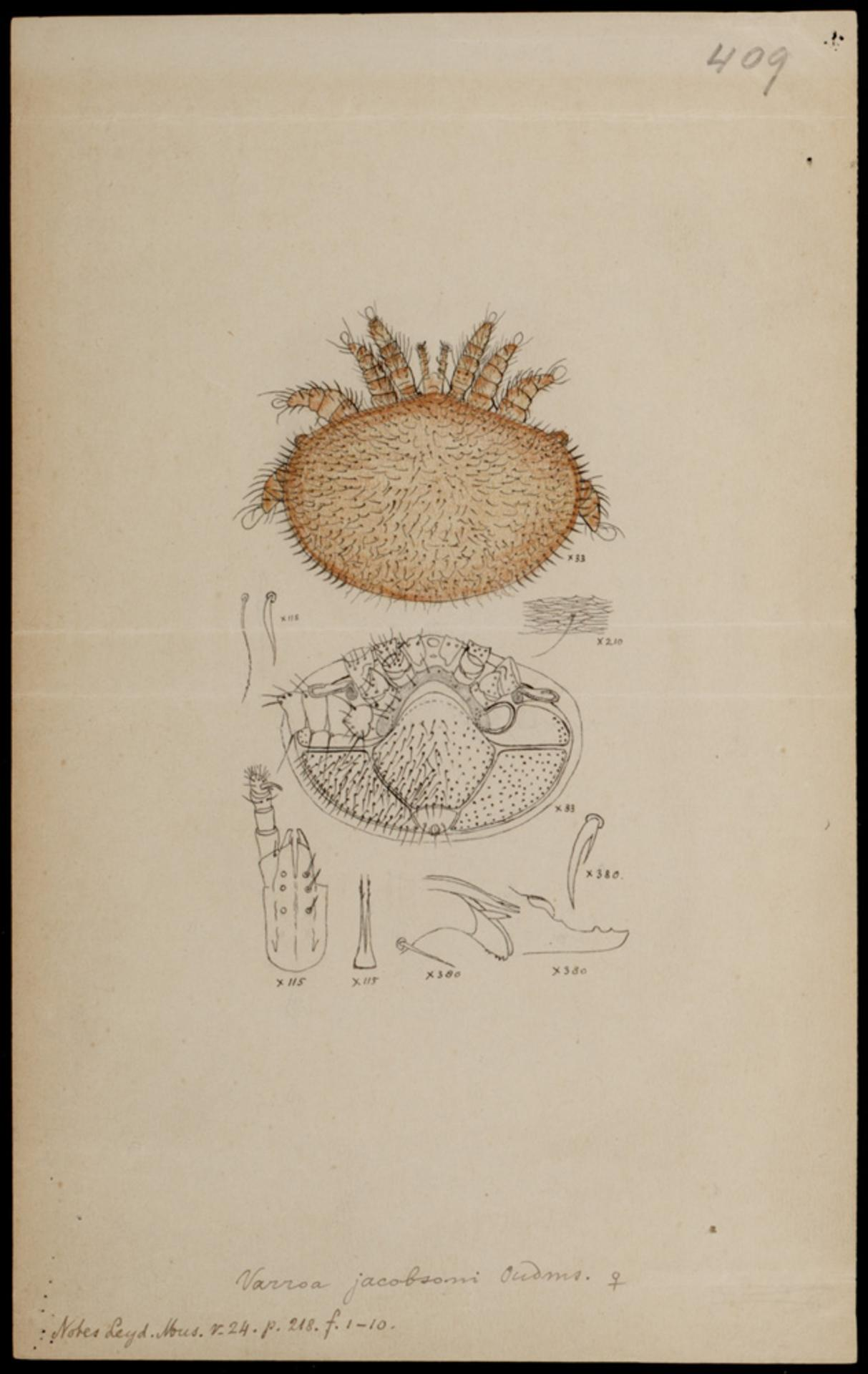
Female of Varroa jacobsoni by A.C. Oudemans.
