= Hexadecanal dehydrogenase (acylating) =

Enzyme

hexadecanal dehydrogenase (acylating)

Identifiers
- EC no.: 1.2.1.42
- CAS no.: 72561-01-4

Databases
- IntEnz: IntEnz view
- BRENDA: BRENDA entry
- ExPASy: NiceZyme view
- KEGG: KEGG entry
- MetaCyc: metabolic pathway
- PRIAM: profile
- PDB structures: RCSB PDB PDBe PDBsum
- Gene Ontology: AmiGO / QuickGO
Search
- PMC: articles
- PubMed: articles
- NCBI: proteins

In enzymology, a hexadecanal dehydrogenase (acylating) (EC 1.2.1.42) is an enzyme that catalyzes the chemical reaction

hexadecanal + CoA + NAD^{+} $\rightleftharpoons$ hexadecanoyl-CoA + NADH + H^{+}

The 3 substrates of this enzyme are hexadecanal, CoA, and NAD^{+}, whereas its 3 products are hexadecanoyl-CoA, NADH, and H^{+}.

This enzyme belongs to the family of oxidoreductases, specifically those acting on the aldehyde or oxo group of donor with NAD+ or NADP+ as acceptor. The systematic name of this enzyme class is hexadecanal:NAD+ oxidoreductase (CoA-acylating). This enzyme is also called fatty acyl-CoA reductase.
