= Hexadecanol dehydrogenase =

Enzyme

hexadecanol dehydrogenase

Identifiers
- EC no.: 1.1.1.164
- CAS no.: 62213-59-6

Databases
- IntEnz: IntEnz view
- BRENDA: BRENDA entry
- ExPASy: NiceZyme view
- KEGG: KEGG entry
- MetaCyc: metabolic pathway
- PRIAM: profile
- PDB structures: RCSB PDB PDBe PDBsum
- Gene Ontology: AmiGO / QuickGO
Search
- PMC: articles
- PubMed: articles
- NCBI: proteins

In enzymology, hexadecanol dehydrogenase (EC 1.1.1.164) is an enzyme that catalyzes the chemical reaction

hexadecanol
+ NAD^{+}
H^{+}
H^{+}
hexadecanal
+ NADH

The two substrates of this enzyme are hexadecanol and oxidised nicotinamide adenine dinucleotide (NAD^{+}). Its products are the aldehyde hexadecanal, reduced NADH, and a proton.

This enzyme belongs to the family of oxidoreductases, specifically those acting on the CH-OH group of donor with NAD^{+} or NADP^{+} as acceptor. The systematic name of this enzyme class is hexadecanol:NAD^{+} oxidoreductase.
