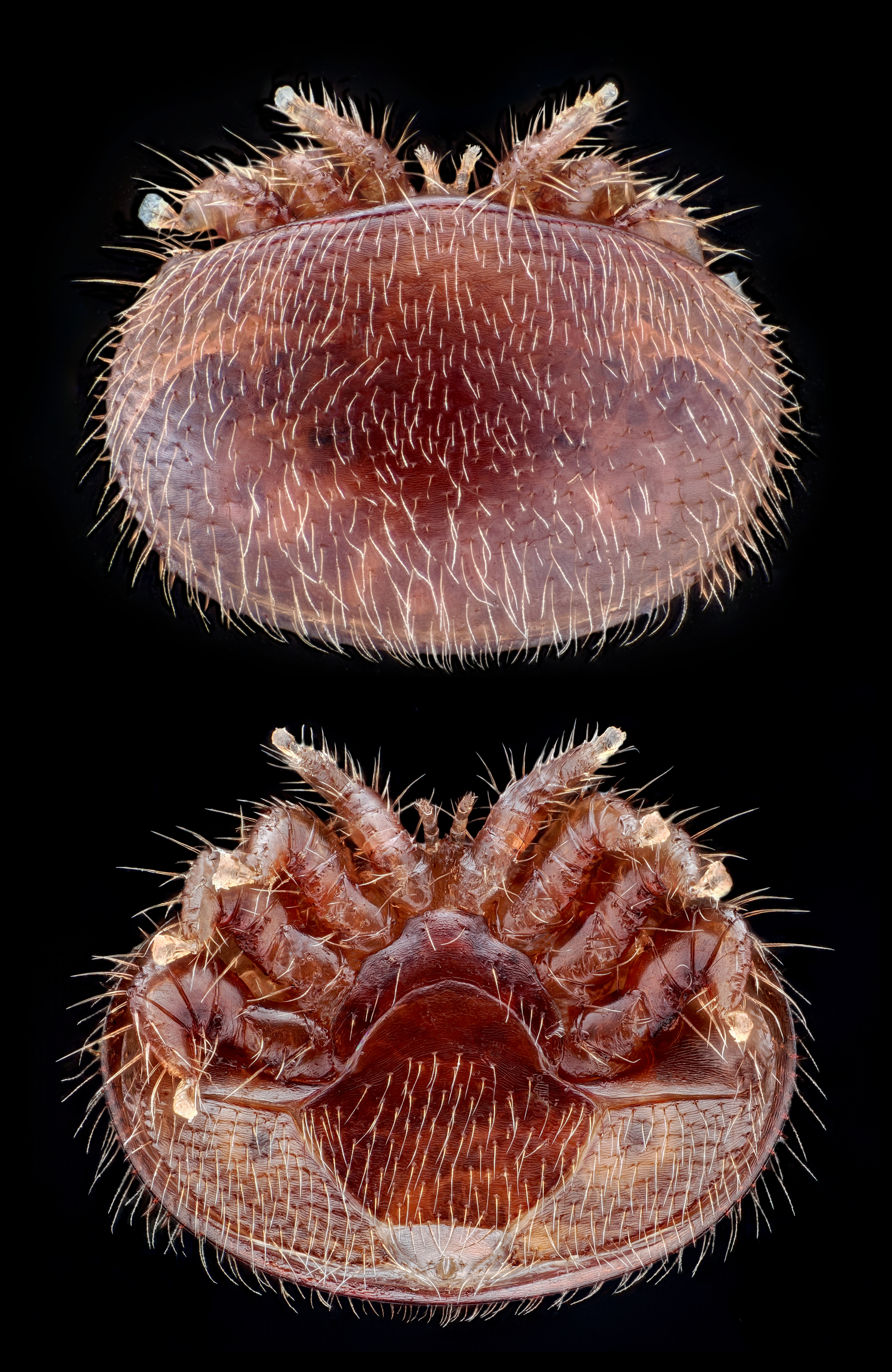
- Varroa destructor adult female in dorsal (top) and ventral (lower) views

Scientific classification
- Kingdom: Animalia
- Phylum: Arthropoda
- Subphylum: Chelicerata
- Class: Arachnida
- Order: Mesostigmata
- Family: Laelapidae
- Genus: Varroa
- Species: V. destructor

Binomial name
- Varroa destructor Anderson & Trueman, 2000

= Varroa destructor =

Species of mite

Varroa destructor, the Varroa mite, is an external parasitic mite that attacks and feeds on honey bees and is one of the most damaging honey bee pests in the world. A significant mite infestation leads to the death of a honey bee colony, usually in the late autumn through early spring. Without management for Varroa mite, honey bee colonies typically collapse within 2 to 3 years in temperate climates. These mites can infest Apis mellifera, the western honey bee, and Apis cerana, the Asian honey bee. Since it is very similar physically to the closely related Varroa jacobsoni, these species were thought to be one prior to 2000, but they were found to be two separate species by DNA analysis.

Parasitism of bees by mites in the genus Varroa is called varroosis. The Varroa mite can reproduce only in a honey bee colony. It attaches to the body of the bee and weakens the bee. The species is a vector for at least five debilitating bee viruses, including RNA viruses such as the deformed wing virus (DWV). The Varroa mite is the parasite with possibly the most pronounced economic impact on the beekeeping industry and is one of multiple stress factors contributing to the higher levels of bee losses around the world. Varroa mite has also been implicated as one of the multiple causes of colony collapse disorder.

Management of this pest focuses on reducing mite numbers through monitoring to avoid significant hive losses or death. 3% of bees infested in a hive is considered an economic threshold where damage is high enough to warrant additional management. Miticides are available, though some are difficult to time correctly while avoiding harm to the hive, and resistance has occurred for others. Screened bottom boards on hives can be used for both monitoring and mite removal, and drone comb, which mites prefer, can be used as a trap to remove mites from the hive. Honey bee lines in breeding programs also show partial resistance to Varroa mite through increased hygienic behavior that is being incorporated as an additional management strategy.

== Description and taxonomy ==
The adult female mite is reddish-brown in color, while the male is white. Varroa mites are flat, having a button shape. They are 1–1.8 mm long and 1.5–2 mm wide, and have eight legs. Varroa mites lack eyes. These mites have curved bodies that allow them to fit between the abdominal segments of adult bees.

Host bee species can help differentiate mite species in the genus Varroa; both V. destructor and Varroa jacobsoni parasitize Apis cerana, the Asian honey bee, but the closely related mite species originally described as V. jacobsoni by Anthonie Cornelis Oudemans in 1904 does not attack Apis mellifera, the western honey bee, unlike V. destructor. Until 2000, V. destructor was thought to be V. jacobsoni and resulted in some mislabeling in the scientific literature. The two species cannot be easily distinguished with physical traits and have 99.7% similar genomes, so DNA analysis is required instead. Because the more virulent and damaging species V. destructor could not be distinguished at the time, most pre-2000 research on western honey bees that refers to V. jacobsoni was actually research on V. destructor.

Other Varroa species V. underwoodi and V. rindereri can also parasitize honey bee species and can be distinguished from V. destructor and V. jacobsoni with slight differences in body size and setae characteristics, though each of the four species within the Varroa genus have similar physical characteristics. If a Varroa species is found on a western honey bee, it will typically be V. destructor except where V. underwoodi is present, such as in Papua New Guinea.

The name "Varroa mite" is typically used as the common name for V. destructor after the species was considered separate from V. jacobsoni.

Bee hosts of Varroa species
Mite species	Bee host
Varroa destructor	western honey bee, Asian honey bee
Varroa jacobsoni	Asian honey bee
Varroa rindereri	Apis koschevnikovi
Varroa underwoodi	western honey bee, Asian honey bee, Apis nigrocincta, Apis nuluensis

Varroa mite has two distinct genetic strains from when it switched hosts from the Asian honey bee to the western honey bee: Korean and Japanese. The Korean strain that emerged in 1952 is now found worldwide in high frequencies, while the Japanese strain that started around 1957 occurs in similar areas at much lower frequencies. Varroa mite has low genetic diversity, which is typical for an invasive species undergoing a range or host expansion.

== Range ==
Varroa mites originally occurred only in Asia on the Asian honey bee, but this species has been introduced to many other countries on several continents, resulting in disastrous infestations of European honey bees.

Introduction data prior to 2000 is unclear because of confusion with V. jacobsoni. By 2020, V. destructor was confirmed to be present throughout North America (excluding Greenland), South America, most of Europe and Asia, and portions of Africa. The species was not present in Australia as well as Oman, Congo, Democratic Republic of Congo, and Malawi. It was suspected to not be present in Sudan and Somalia. Mites were found in 2022 in New South Wales in Australia.

== Life cycle ==
Female mites enter brood cells to lay eggs on the comb wall just before the cell is capped. Eggs are approximately 0.2 to 0.3 mm in diameter and cannot be seen without magnification. These eggs hatch into male and female protonymphs that are both transparent white. Immature mites can only feed on capped brood, so the life cycle cannot be completed during broodless periods. Protonymphs molt into deuteronymphs that more closely resemble the curved body of adults before they molt into adults. Development time from egg to adult is 6–7 days. Males will not leave brood cells and only mate with females present in the brood cell.

Adult females can be found feeding both on brood and adult bees. After reaching the adult stage, females will leave the brood cell and enter a phoretic stage where mites attach to adult bees in order to disperse. Mites will feed on adult bees at this time and can be transmitted from bee to bee during this stage. Nurse bees are preferred hosts in order to be moved to new brood cells. Because the nurse bee spends more time around the drone brood (i.e., male bees) rather than the worker brood, many more drones are infected with the mites. These phoretic females can also be transmitted to other hives through bee contact or hive equipment transfer. The phoretic stage can last for 4.5–11 days during brood production periods or up to five to six months when no brood is present in winter months. Female mites have a life expectancy of 27 days when brood is present.

After the phoretic stage, female mites leave the adult bee and enter brood cells with bee larvae. Drone cells are preferred over workers. These females are called foundress mites, and they bury themselves in brood food provided by worker bees before the cell is capped. Brood cell capping begins egg cell activation for a foundress mite while she emerges to feed on the larva. She will lay a single unfertilized egg after feeding to produce a male mite. After laying this egg, fertilized eggs to produce females are laid approximately once a day. Both the mother and nymphs will feed on the developing pupa. Unless multiple foundress mites are present in a cell, mating occurs between siblings when they reach the adult stage. Once females mate, they are unable to receive additional sperm. Varroa mite's genetic bottleneck is also likely due to its habit of sibling mating.

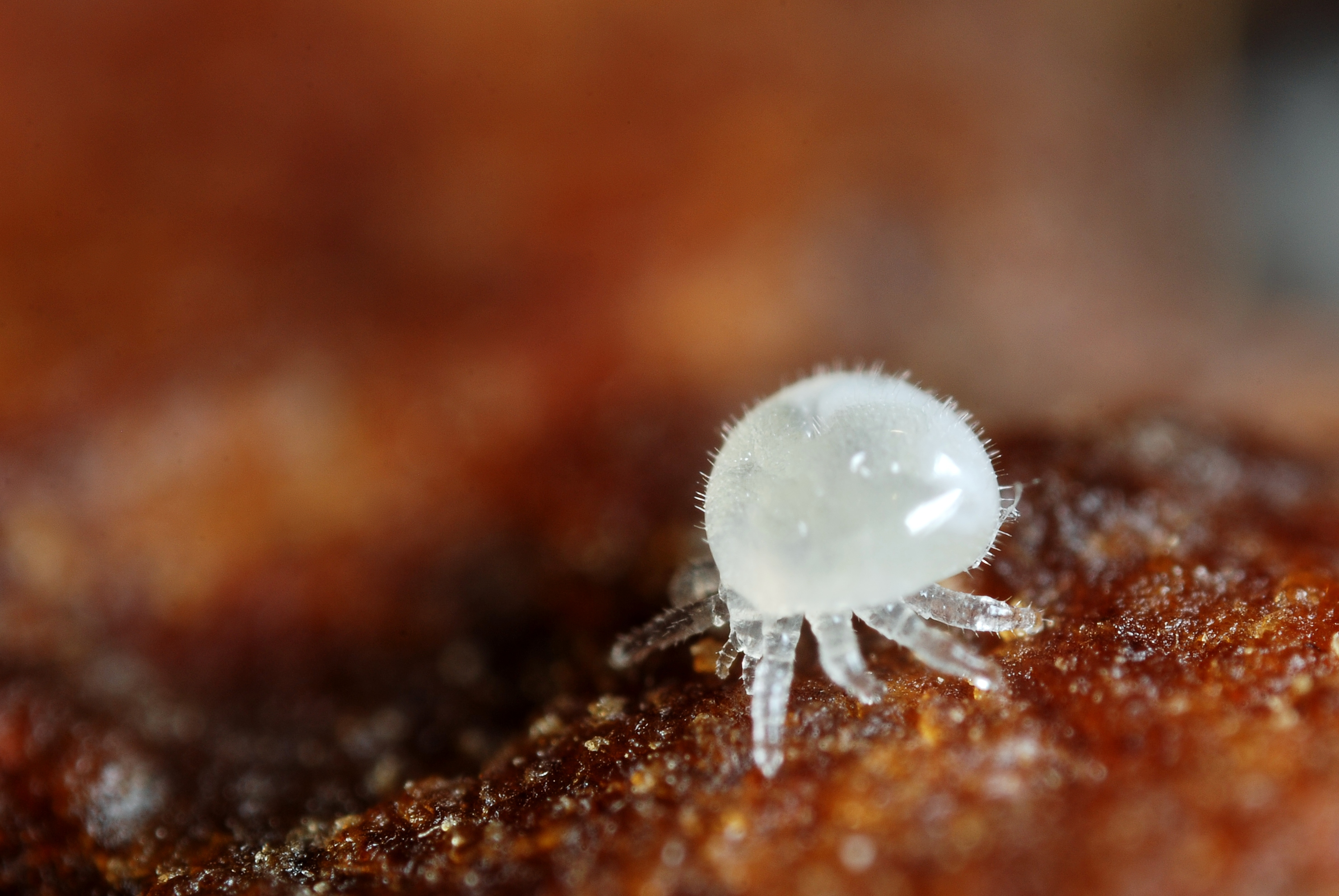
V. destructor protonymph

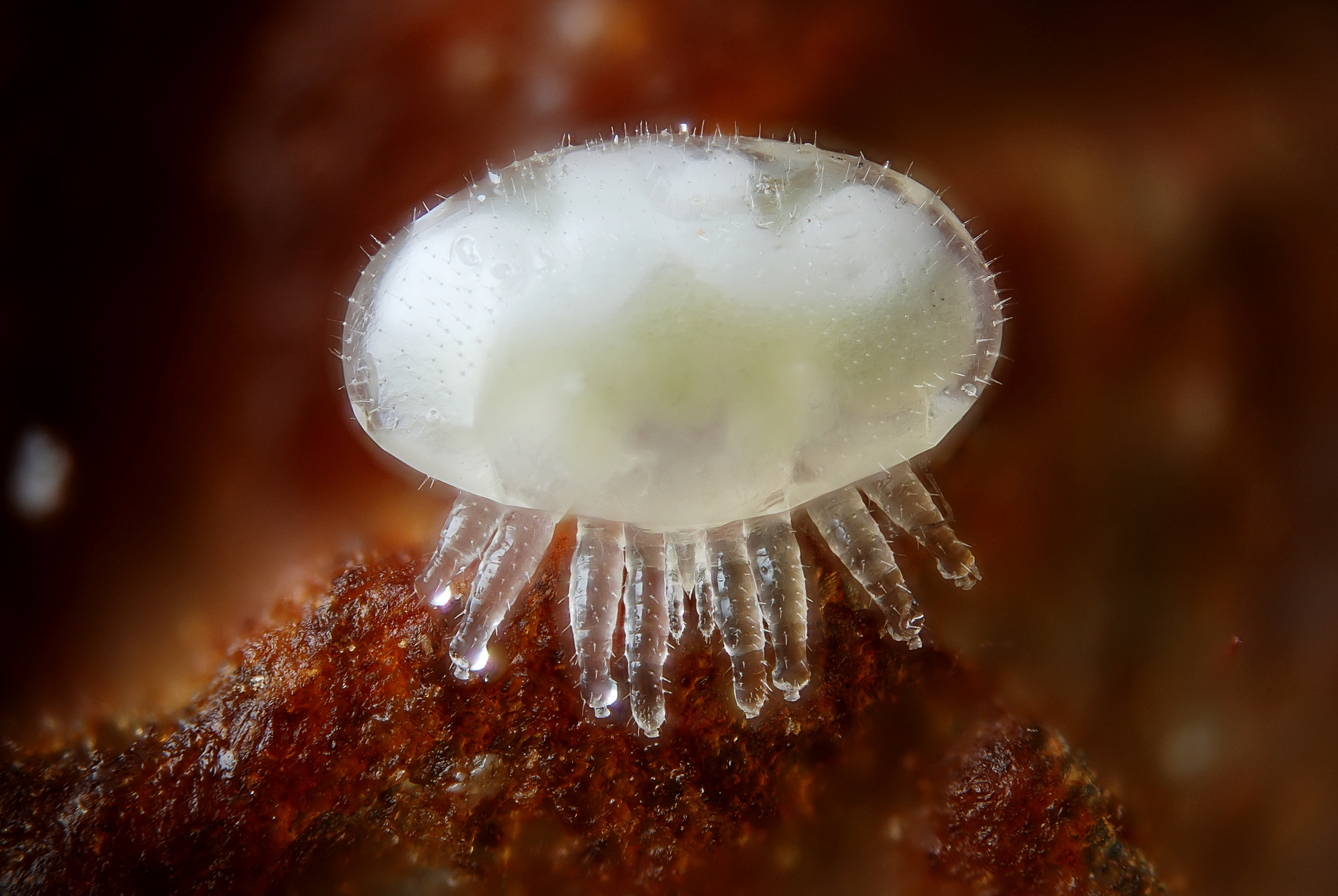
Deutonymph of V. destructor

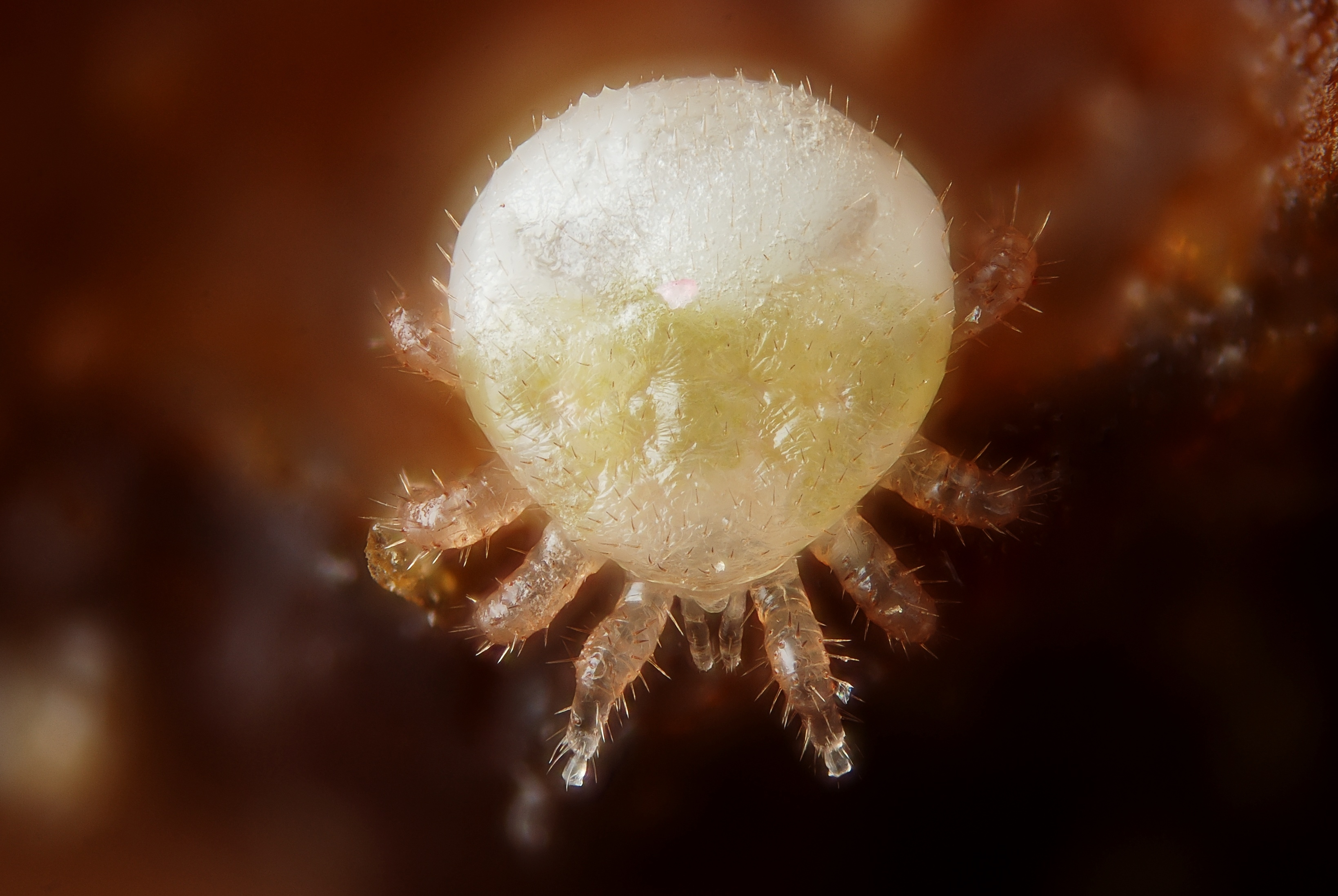
V. destructor adult male

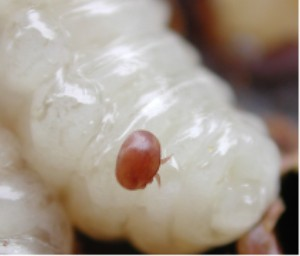
Varroa mite on bee larva

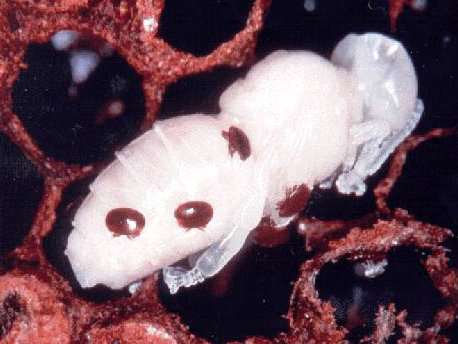
Varroa mites on pupa

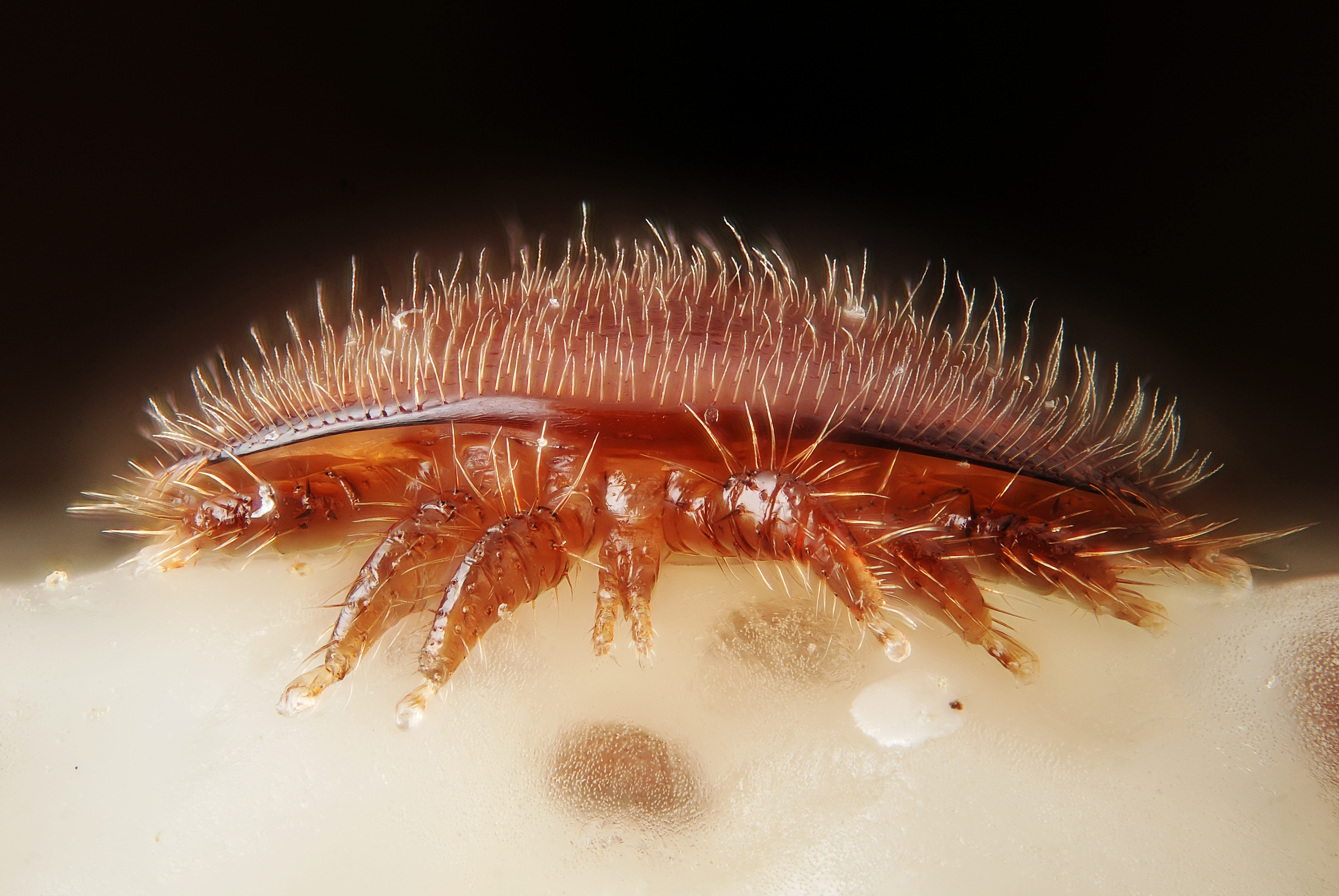
Adult female in frontal view

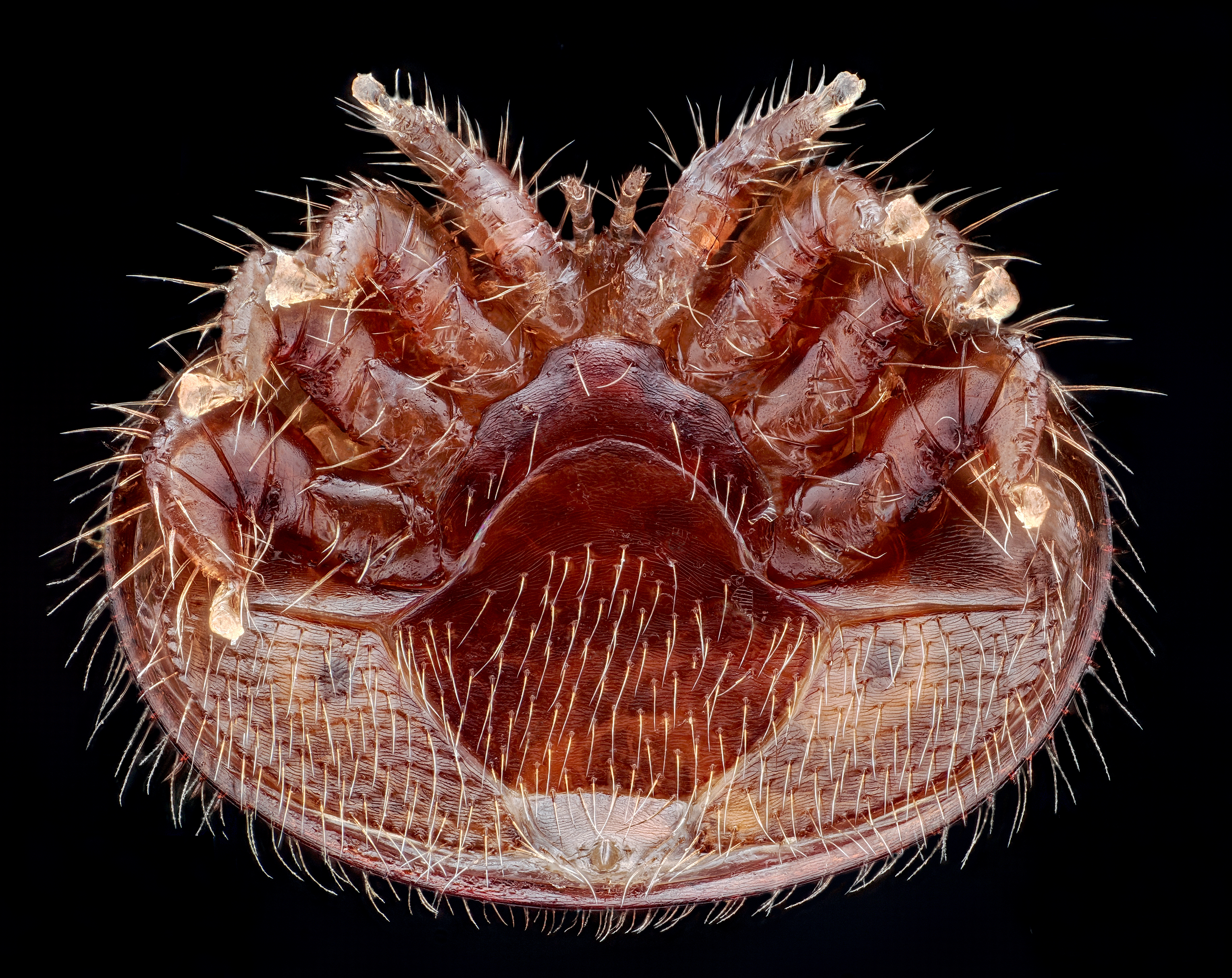
Adult female in ventral view

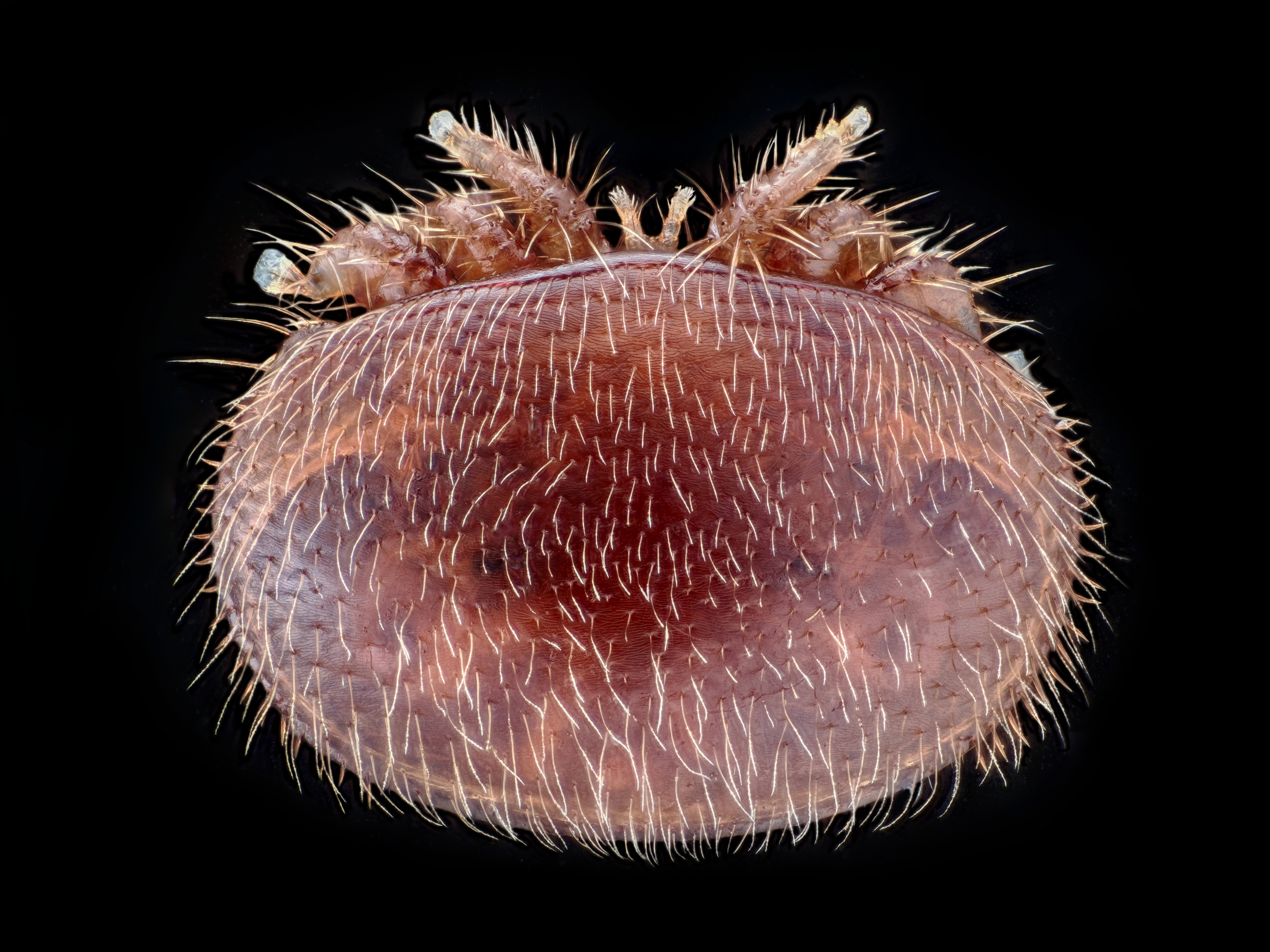
Adult female in dorsal view

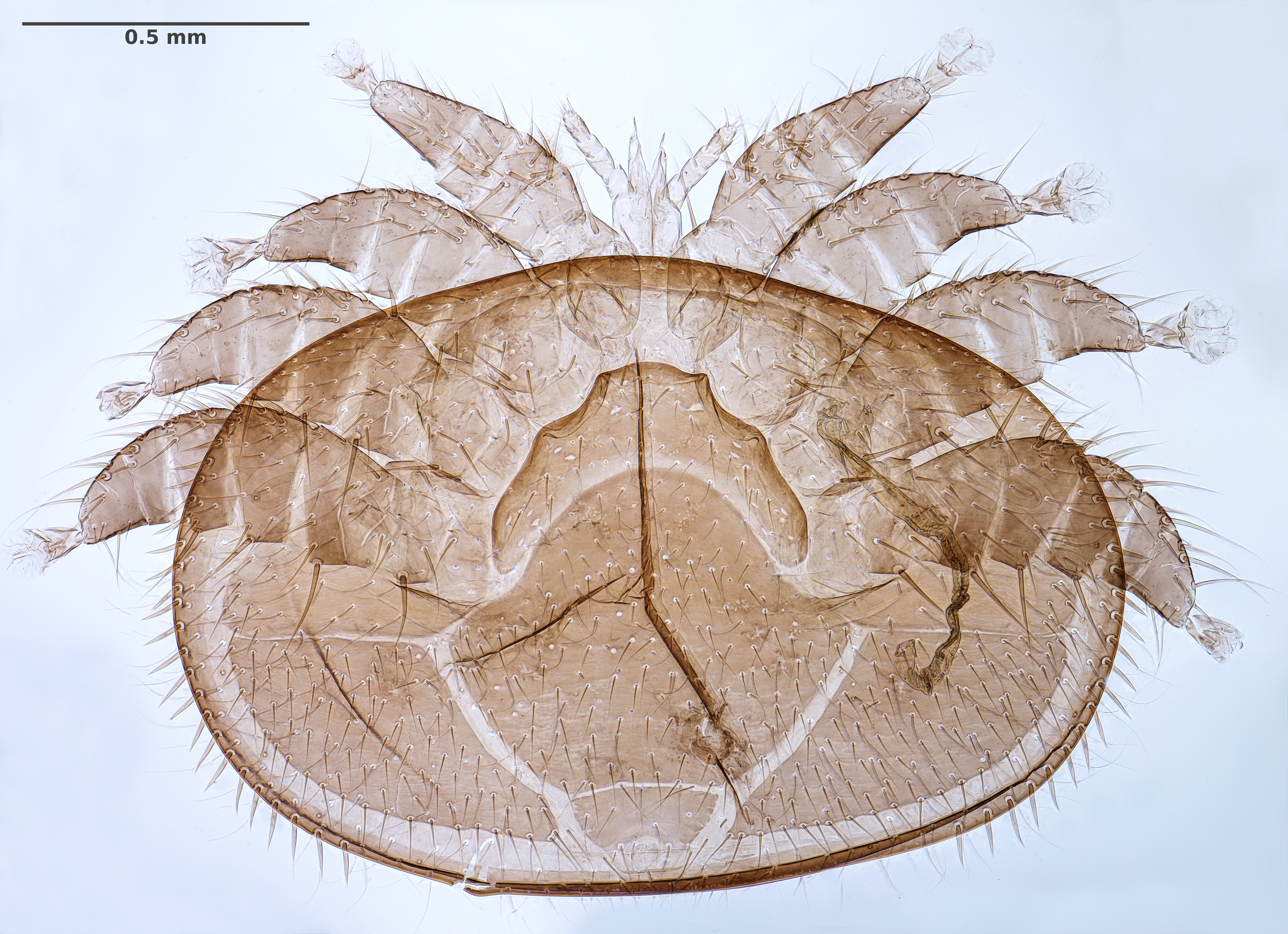
Adult female mounted for microscopy

== Host interactions ==
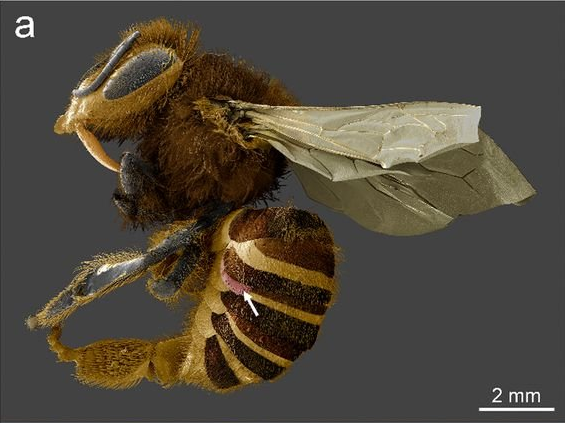
Scanning electron microscope image of Varroa mite wedged between bee segments indicated by white arrow.

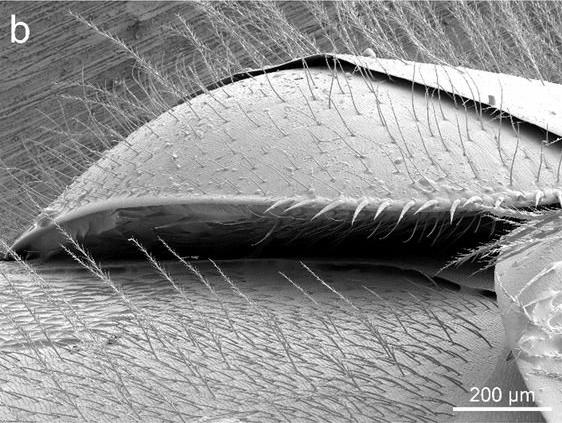
Close-up scanning electron microscope image of Varroa mite wedged between bee segments.

Adult mites feed on both adult bees and bee larvae by sucking on the fat body, an insect organ that stores glycogen and triglycerides with tissue abundant under epidermis and the surrounding internal body cavity. As the fat body is crucial for many bodily functions such as hormone and energy regulation, immunity, and pesticide detoxification, the mite's consumption of the fat body weakens both the adult bee and the larva. Feeding on fat body cells significantly decreases the weight of both the immature and adult bee. Infested adult worker bees have a shorter lifespan than ordinary worker bees, and they furthermore tend to be absent from the colony far more than ordinary bees, which could be due to their reduced ability to navigate or regulate their energy for flight. Infested bees are more likely to wander into other hives and further increase spread. Bees will occasionally drift into other nearby hives, but this rate is higher for Varroa infested bees.

Adult mites live and feed under the abdominal plates of adult bees primarily on the underside of the abdominal region on the left side of the bee. Adult mites are more often identified as present in the hive when on top of the adult bee on the thorax, but mites in this location are likely not feeding, but rather attempting to transfer to another bee.

Varroa mites have been found on flowers visited by worker bees, which may be a means by which phoretic mites spread short distances when other bees, including from other hives, visit. They have also been found on larvae of some wasp species, such as Vespula vulgaris, and flower-feeding insects such as the bumblebee, Bombus pensylvanicus, the scarab beetle, Phanaeus vindex, and the flower-fly, Palpada vinetorum. There have not been any indications that Varroa mites are able to complete their life cycle on these insects, but instead they become distributed to other areas while a mite is still alive on these insects.

== Virus transmission ==
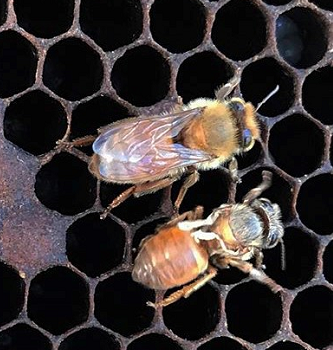
Healthy nurse bee (top) and infected bee with deformed wing virus (DWV) (bottom)

Open wounds left by the feeding become sites for disease and virus infections. The mites are vectors for at least five and possibly up to 18 debilitating bee viruses, including RNA viruses such as the deformed wing virus.

Prior to the widespread introduction of Varroa mite, honey bee viruses were typically considered a minor issue. Virus particles are directly injected into the bee's body cavity and mites can also cause immunosuppression that increases infection in host bees. Varroa mites can transmit the following viruses:

- Kashmir bee virus
- Sacbrood virus
- Acute bee paralysis virus
- Israeli acute paralysis virus
- Deformed wing virus

Deformed wing virus is one of the most prominent and damaging honey bee viruses transmitted by Varroa mites. It causes crumpled deformed wings that resemble sticks and also causes shortened abdomens.

=== Colony collapse disorder ===
There is some evidence that harm from both Varroa mite and associated viruses they transmit may be a contributing factor that leads to colony collapse disorder (CCD). While the exact causes of CCD are not known, infection of colonies from multiple pathogens and interaction of those pathogens with environmental stresses is considered by entomologists to be one of the likely causes of CCD. Most scientists agree there is not a single cause of CCD.

== Management ==
Mite populations undergo exponential growth when bee broods are available, and exponential decline when no brood is available. In 12 weeks, the number of mites in a western honey bee hive can multiply by roughly 12. Mites often invade colonies in the summer, leading to high mite populations in autumn. High mite populations in the autumn can cause a crisis when drone rearing ceases and the mites switch to worker larvae, causing a quick population crash and often hive death. Various management methods are used for Varroa mite integrated pest management to monitor and manage damage to hives.

=== Monitoring ===
Beekeepers use several methods for monitoring levels of Varroa mites in a colony. They involve either estimating the total number of mites in a hive by using a sticky board under a screen bottom board to capture mites falling from the hive or estimating the number of mites per bee with powdered sugar or an ethanol wash.

Monitoring for mites with a sticky board can be used to estimate the total number of mites in a colony over 72 hours using the equation:

$$p(c)=\frac{100b-376}{3}$$

where b is the number of mites found on the sticky board and c is the number of estimated mites in the colony. However, the bee population in a colony also needs to be known to determine what population of mites is tolerable with this method.

Mite counts from a known quantity of bees (i.e., 300 bees) collected from brood comb are instead often used to determine mite severity. Mites are dislodged from a sample of bees using non-lethal or lethal means. The bees are shaken in a container of either powdered sugar, alcohol, or soapy water to dislodge and count mites. Powdered sugar is generally considered non-lethal to honey bees, but lethal methods such as alcohol can be more effective at dislodging mites. 3% of the colony being infested is considered an economic threshold damaging enough to warrant further management such as miticides, though beekeepers may use other management tactics in the 0–2% infestation range to keep mite populations low.

=== Chemical measures ===
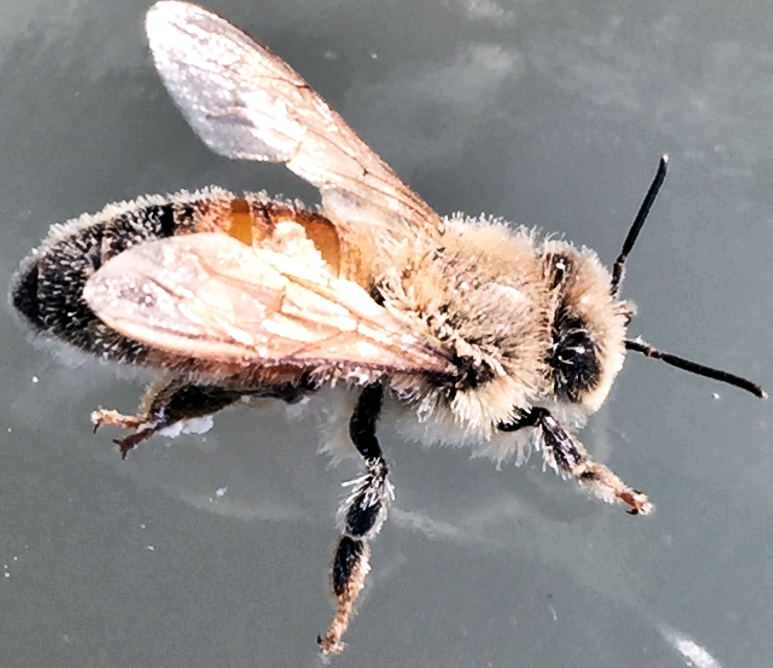
Honey bee coated with oxalic acid to protect it from mites

Varroa mites can be treated with commercially available acaricides that must be timed carefully to minimize the contamination of honey that might be consumed by humans. The four most common synthetic pesticides used for mite treatments with formulations specific for honey bee colony use are amitraz, coumaphos, and two pyrethroids, flumethrin and tau-fluvalinate, while naturally occurring compounds include formic acid, oxalic acid, essential oils such as thymol and beta acids from hops resin (e.g. lupulone). Many of these products whether synthetic or naturally produced can negatively affect honey bee brood or queens. These products often are applied through impregnated plastic strips or as powders spread between brood frames.

Synthetic compounds often have high efficacy against Varroa mites, but resistance has occurred for all of these products in different areas of the world. Pyrethroids are used because a concentration that will kill mites has relatively low toxicity to honey bees. Compounds derived from plants have also been assessed for mite management. Thymol is one essential oil with efficacy against mites, but can be harmful to bees at high temperatures. Other essential oils such as garlic, oregano, and neem oil have had some efficacy in field trials, though most essential oils that have been tested have little to no effect. Essential oil use is widespread in hives with many of those uses being off-label or in violation of pesticide regulations in various countries. Hop beta acids are lupulones obtained from hop plants and have been used in products marketed for mite control.

Pesticides used for Varroa mite treatment
Chemical	Efficacy	Notes
Amitraz	High (75–90%)	Not very affordable; slower occurrence of resistance
Coumaphos	Low	Use decreased over time because of low efficacy and resistance
Flumethrin	High (73–97%)	Negative effects to honey bees less severe than tau-fluvalinate
Tau-fluvalinate	Low	Efficacy lost to resistance; reduced brood survival and queen size
Formic acid	High (35–75%)	Efficacy varies on the basis of temperature, brood population, and proximity to the chemical within the hive; can cause brood or queen mortality
Oxalic acid	High (near 100%)	Used during broodless periods only and increases grooming behavior; no known cases of resistance
Thymol	Moderate (50–80%)	Similar temperature-based issues to formic acid, not effective under 15 °C (59 °F)
Hop beta acids	Moderate (43–88%)	Low toxicity to humans and bees

Resistance to pyrethroids has occurred in the Czech Republic and the UK as a result of a single amino acid substitution on Varroa mite's genome. In spring 2025, a preprint article attributed the previous year's abnormally high average hive losses of 60% or more to the spread of amitraz-resistant Varroa mites in the United States, with potential mechanisms including another single amino acid substitution. Underlying mechanisms for resistance in other pesticides, such as coumaphos, are still unknown.

=== Mechanical control ===
Varroa mites can also be controlled through nonchemical means. Most of these controls are intended to reduce the mite population to a manageable level, not to eliminate the mites completely.

Screened bottom boards are used both for monitoring and can modestly reduce mite populations by 11–14%. Mites which fall from the comb or bees can land outside the hive instead landing on a solid bottom board that would allow them to easily return to the nest.

Varroa infest drone cells at a higher rate than worker brood cells, so drone cells can be used as a trap for mite removal. Beekeepers can also introduce a frame with drone foundation cells that encourage bees to construct more drone cells. When the drone cells are capped, the frame can be removed to freeze out mites. This labor-intensive process can reduce mite levels by about 50–93%, but if trap cells are not removed early enough before mites emerge, mite populations can spike. This method is only viable in spring and early summer when drones are produced.

Heat is also sometimes used as a control method. The mites cannot survive temperatures near 40 °C (104 °F), but brief exposure to these temperatures do not harm honey bees. Devices are marketed as heat brooding to these temperatures, though the efficacy of many of these products has not been reviewed.

Powdered sugar used for estimating mite counts in hives has also been considered for mite management as it or other inert dusts were believed to initiate grooming responses. Long-term studies do not show any efficacy for reducing mite populations.

=== Genetic methods ===
==== Honey bee genetics ====
The Asian honey bee, is more hygienic with respect to Varroa mite than western honey bees, which is in part why mite infestations are more pronounced in western honey bee colonies. Efforts also have been made to breed hygienic honey bees heritable behavior traits, such as those with resistance to Varroa mites. Honey bee lines with resistance include Minnesota Hygienic Bees, Russian Honey Bees, and Varroa sensitive hygiene.

Hygienic behaviors include workers removing pupae heavily infested with mites, which kills both the developing bee and immature mites, and grooming or removal from the brood cell, which increases adult mite mortality. Mites removed from host pupae are at an incorrect life stage to re-infest another pupa. An extended phoretic period in adult female mites has also been noticed.

Hygienic behavior is effective against diseases such as American foulbrood or chalkbrood, but the efficacy of this behavior against mites is not well-quantified; colonies with this behavior alone do not necessarily result in Varroa mite resistant colonies that can survive without miticide treatments. The efficacy of this behavior can vary between bee lines in comparison studies with Minnesota hygienic bees removing 66% of infested pupae, while Varroa sensitive hygiene bees removed 85% of infested pupae. There are minimal trade-off costs to hives that have this hygienic behavior, so it is being actively pursued in bee breeding programs.

==== Mite genetics ====
Researchers have been able to use RNA interference by feeding honey bees mixtures of double-stranded RNA that target expression of several Varroa mite genes, such as cytoskeleton arrangement, transfer of energy, and transcription. This can reduce infestation to 50% without harm to honey bees and is being pursued as an additional control method for Varroa mite.

== See also ==
- Acarapis woodi - Tracheal mite
- Mite biting bees
- Nosema ceranae
- Nosema apis
- Thymovar
- https://www.varroaresistant.uk/
