= 2-hexadecenal reductase =

Enzyme

Identifiers
- EC no.: 1.3.1.27
- CAS no.: 52227-95-9

Databases
- IntEnz: IntEnz view
- BRENDA: BRENDA entry
- ExPASy: NiceZyme view
- KEGG: KEGG entry
- MetaCyc: metabolic pathway
- PRIAM: profile
- PDB structures: RCSB PDB PDBe PDBsum
- Gene Ontology: AmiGO / QuickGO
Search
- PMC: articles
- PubMed: articles
- NCBI: proteins

In enzymology, 2-hexadecenal reductase (EC 1.3.1.27) is an enzyme that catalyzes the chemical reaction

2-trans-hexadecanal
+ NADPH
H^{+}
H^{+}
hexadecanal
+ NADP^{+}

The three substrates of this enzyme are 2-trans-hexadecenal, reduced nicotinamide adenine dinucleotide phosphate (NADPH), and a proton. Its products are hexadecanal, oxidised NADP^{+}, and a proton.

This enzyme belongs to the family of oxidoreductases, specifically those acting on the CH-CH group of donor with NAD+ or NADP+ as acceptor. The systematic name of this enzyme class is hexadecanal:NADP+ Delta2-oxidoreductase. Other names in common use include 2-alkenal reductase, and hexadecanal: NADP+ oxidoreductase.
