= C16H12O4 =

The molecular formula C_{16}H_{12}O_{4} (molar mass: 268.26 g/mol, exact mass: 268.073559 u) may refer to:

- 3-Hydroxy-4'-methoxyflavone, a flavonol
- Formononetin, an isoflavone
- Isoformononetin (4'-hydroxy-7-methoxyisoflavone), an isoflavone
- Pratol, a flavone
- Techtochrysin, a flavone
- Furobufen
