= Thymovar =

Pesticide against varroa mites

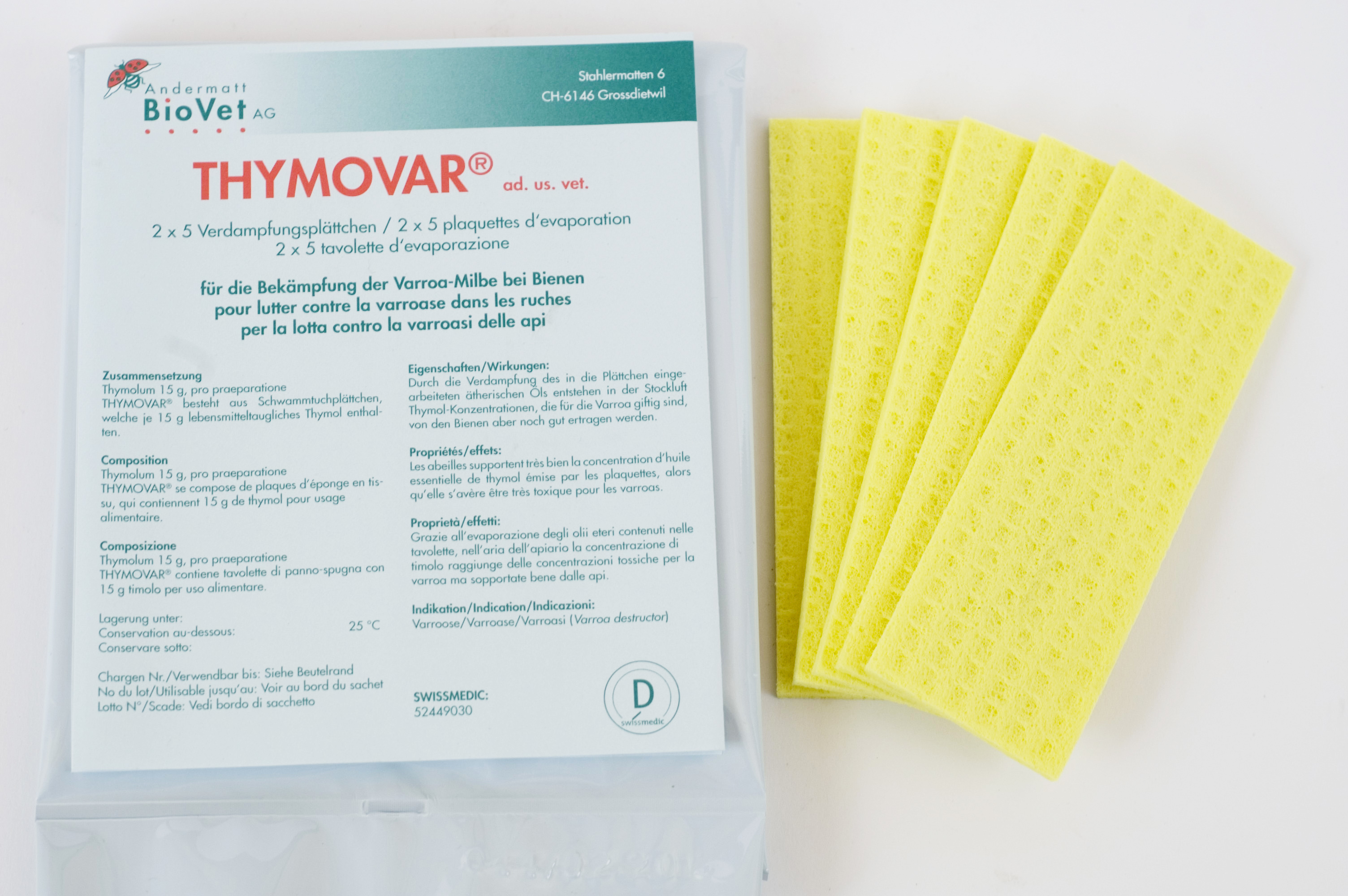
THYMOVAR

THYMOVAR is a product to control the Varroa mite (Varroa destructor) on bees (Apis mellifera) and contains the essential oil thymol.

THYMOVAR contains thymol, a volatile substance which sublimates in the air depending on temperature. On release, thymol vapour concentrations build up in the treated beehive. These vapours are highly toxic to varroa mites but concentrations are not high enough to harm the honey bees. For optimal control, appropriate concentrations of thymol vapour must be maintained for six to eight weeks.

== Uses ==
=== Temperature ===
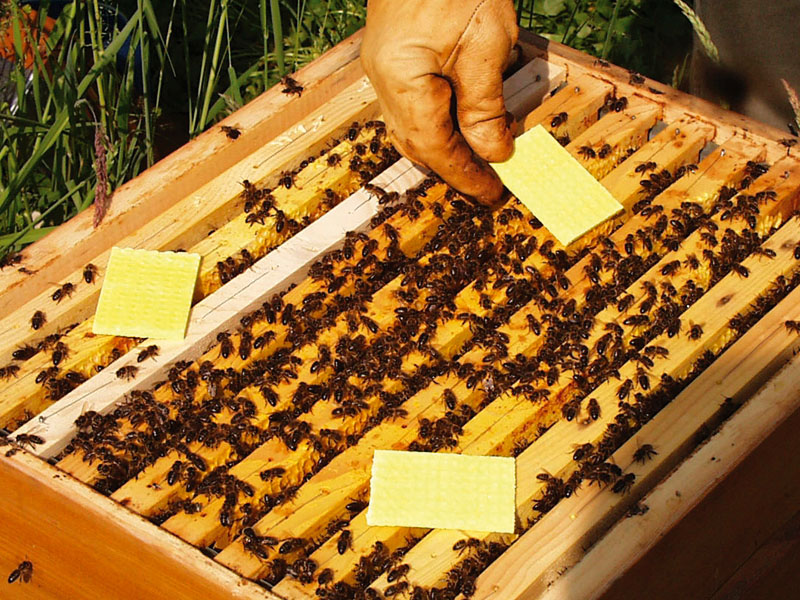
THYMOVAR - Uses

Best efficacy is achieved when maximum daytime temperatures are between 20 °C and 25 °C throughout treatment. Reduced product efficacy occurs if average temperatures fall below 15 °C during the treatment.

Do not apply if outside temperatures exceed 30 °C. Treatment at temperatures in excess of 30 °C leads to increased stress and mortality of adult bees and brood.

=== Time of treatment ===
The best time for THYMOVAR treatment is as soon as possible after the last honey harvest in late summer at recommended temperatures. Treat all hives in an apiary at the same time to avoid robbing behaviour.

=== Application ===
Prior to THYMOVAR treatment, remove all honey supers, close or replace open or screened hive floors with solid floors, and reduce the hive entrances to normal size. It is recommended that part of the feeding is carried out before the treatment, if the infestation of varroa and the temperatures allow.

Begin the 1st application of a treatment by placing appropriate number of bee-hive strips (positions shown in Fig. 1) on top of combs of the brood chamber (upper brood chamber if two). Bee-hive strips should be close to, but not directly over open or sealed brood (preferable distance > 4 cm). Close the hive, leaving space (about 5 mm) between the bee-hive strips and the hive cover to improve the evaporation of thymol. Do not place plastic cover foils directly on the bee-hive strips. Remove the 1st set of depleted THYMOVAR wafers after 3–4 weeks.

Begin the 2nd application immediately with a new set of bee-hive strips in appropriate numbers and positions, as shown in Fig. 1. Remove these bee-hive strips when they are depleted at the end of the 2nd 3-4 week application period.

== Concept of Control ==
A combined application of THYMOVAR with an oxalic acid treatment in the broodless time (November - December) has proved very efficient against the Varroa. Through volatilisation, thymol vapour concentrations build up in the hive. These are highly toxic to the varroa mites, but do not harm the bees. Detailed information can be found at Andermatt BioVet AG.
