= Acrinathrin =

Names
- Preferred IUPAC name (S)-Cyano(3-phenoxyphenyl)methyl (1R,3S)-3-{(1Z)-3-[(1,1,1,3,3,3-hexafluoropropan-2-yl)oxy]-3-oxoprop-1-en-1-yl}-2,2-dimethylcyclopropane-1-carboxylate

Identifiers
| CAS Number | 101007-06-1 |
| 3D model (JSmol) | Interactive image |
| ChemSpider | 4941233 |
| ECHA InfoCard | 100.126.096 |
| PubChem CID | 6436606 |
| UNII | QUI1AZ37K6 |
| CompTox Dashboard (EPA) | DTXSID3041584 |
- InChI: InChI=1S/C26H21F6NO5/c1-24(2)18(11-12-20(34)38-23(25(27,28)29)26(30,31)32)21(24)22(35)37-19(14-33)15-7-6-10-17(13-15)36-16-8-4-3-5-9-16/h3-13,18-19,21,23H,1-2H3/b12-11-/t18-,19+,21-/m0/s1 Key: YLFSVIMMRPNPFK-WEQBUNFVSA-N; InChI=1/C26H21F6NO5/c1-24(2)18(11-12-20(34)38-23(25(27,28)29)26(30,31)32)21(24)22(35)37-19(14-33)15-7-6-10-17(13-15)36-16-8-4-3-5-9-16/h3-13,18-19,21,23H,1-2H3/b12-11-/t18-,19+,21-/m0/s1 Key: YLFSVIMMRPNPFK-WEQBUNFVBO
- SMILES: CC1(C)[C@@H](/C=C\C(=O)OC(C(F)(F)F)C(F)(F)F)[C@H]1C(=O)O[C@H](C#N)c1cccc(Oc2ccccc2)c1

Properties
| Chemical formula | C_{26}H_{21}F_{6}NO_{5} |
| Molar mass | 541.446 g·mol^{−1} |

Pharmacology
| ATCvet code | QP53AC15 (WHO) |
- Except where otherwise noted, data are given for materials in their standard state (at 25 °C [77 °F], 100 kPa). Infobox references

Acrinathrin (Rufast and other trade names) is a pyrethroid insecticide and acaricide derived from hexafluoro-2-propanol. In beekeeping, it is used to control the mite Varroa jacobsoni, though resistance is developing.

== Synthesis and Preparation ==
Acrinathrin can be synthesized via a multi-step reaction starting from chrysanthemic acid and 3-phenoxybenzonitrile.

== Properties ==
Acrinathrin is a white to yellowish solid that is practically insoluble in water. Its chemical structure is similar to that of cypermethrin, except that the chlorine atoms in cypermethrin are replaced by a fluorine ester group. The compound was discovered and first synthesized by Roussel Uclaf in the 1980s. It is stable under acidic conditions but unstable under diffuse light and alkaline conditions. The compound has an orthorhombic crystal structure belonging to the space group P2_{1}2_{1}2_{1} (No. 19), with lattice parameters a = 7.4932 Å, b = 9.2679 Å, and c = 36.9165 Å, and 4 formula units per unit cell. The dihedral angle between the cyclopropane ring plane and the plane of the vinyl group is 79.3°. The dihedral angle between the planes of the benzene and phenyl rings in the phenoxybenzyl group is 82.7°. In the crystal structure, weak intermolecular C–H⋯π interactions and C–H⋯F hydrogen bonds contribute to structural stabilization.

== Uses ==
Acrinathrin is used as an insecticide and acaricide against a range of plant-feeding mites.

== Approval ==
In the EU, effective January 1, 2012, its use as an insecticide and acaricide was approved at a maximum rate of 22.5 g/ha per application. For plant protection products containing acrinathrin that were available on the market but did not comply with the regulations, approvals were to be amended or revoked by December 31, 2015, at the latest, if necessary.

In Germany, Austria, and Switzerland, no plant protection products containing this active ingredient are authorized.
