= 4',7-Dihydroxyflavone =

Chemical compound

4′,7-Dihydroxyflavone

Names
- IUPAC name 4′,7-Dihydroxyflavone
- Systematic IUPAC name 7-Hydroxy-2-(4-hydroxyphenyl)-4H-1-benzopyran-4-one
- Other names 7,4′-Dihydroxyflavone

Identifiers
CAS Number	2196-14-7
3D model (JSmol)	Interactive image
ChEBI	CHEBI:29503
ChemSpider	4445298
PubChem CID	5282073
UNII	53ZZF57X0U
CompTox Dashboard (EPA)	DTXSID50176365
- InChI: InChI=1S/C15H10O4/c16-10-3-1-9(2-4-10)14-8-13(18)12-6-5-11(17)7-15(12)19-14/h1-8,16-17H Key: LCAWNFIFMLXZPQ-UHFFFAOYSA-N; InChI=1/C15H10O4/c16-10-3-1-9(2-4-10)14-8-13(18)12-6-5-11(17)7-15(12)19-14/h1-8,16-17H Key: LCAWNFIFMLXZPQ-UHFFFAOYAD
- SMILES: C1=CC(=CC=C1C2=CC(=O)C3=C(O2)C=C(C=C3)O)O

Properties
Chemical formula	C_{15}H_{10}O_{4}
Molar mass	254.241 g·mol^{−1}
- Except where otherwise noted, data are given for materials in their standard state (at 25 °C [77 °F], 100 kPa). Infobox references

4′,7-Dihydroxyflavone is a flavone. It is found in Medicago truncatula in relation with the root nodulation symbiont Sinorhizobium meliloti or in seeds of Sophora viciifolia.

Like many other flavonoids, 4′,7-dihydroxyflavone has been found to possess activity at opioid receptors in vitro. Specifically, it acts as an antagonist of the μ-opioid receptor and, with lower affinity, of the κ- and δ-opioid receptors.

== See also ==
- Pratol (7-hydroxy-4′-methoxyflavone) is the O-methylated form of the molecule.
