= C16H14O5 =

The molecular formula C_{16}H_{14}O_{5} (molar mass : 286.27 g/mol, exact mass : 286.084124 u) may refer to:

- Brazilin, an indenochromene
- Coeloginanthrin, a phrenathrenoid found in the orchid Coelogyne cristata
- Dihydrowogonin, a flavanone
- Guacetisal, a drug for respiratory disease
- Isosakuranetin, a flavanone
- Kushenin, a pterocarpan
- Lichexanthone, a xanthone
- Linderone, a cyclopentenone
- Phyllodulcin, an isocoumarin
- Poriol, a flavanone
- Sakuranetin, a flavanone
