= Mite biting bees =

Honey bee behavior

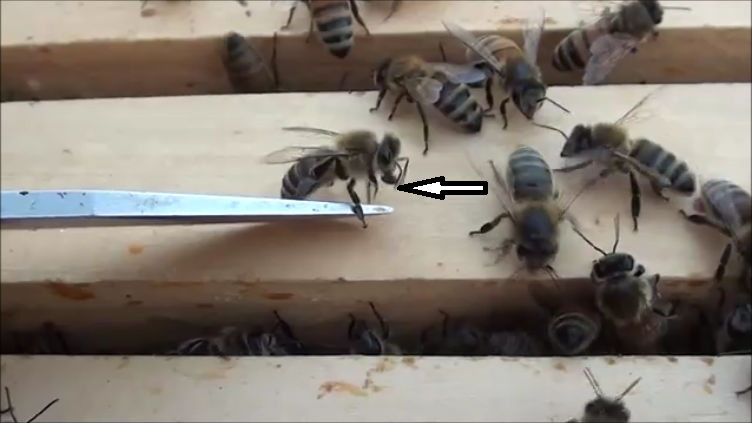

Mite biting is claimed to be a natural defensive behavior of some honey bees used to fight off the ectoparasitic mites Varroa destructor. This behavior has been studied since the late 1990s for honey bee breeding and improvement of honeybee stocks towards mite resistance. Krispn Given and Dr. Greg Hunt at Purdue University started a hierarchical selective breeding program in 1997–present for increased mite-biting and grooming behavior of European honey bee (Apis mellifera). A group of Midwest bee breeders visiting the Purdue bee lab were inspired to start the Heartland Honey Bee Breeders Cooperative as a result of their pioneering work.

The Bee Research Lab at Central State University led by Dr. Hongmei Li-Byarlay has studied the grooming and mite-biting behavior and selected mite resistant stocks since the fall of 2017 and discovered that morphological changes in the bee mandibles may explain the better mite-biting behavior in the breeding stocks. CSU stocks are called Ohio Mite Biter #1 (OB1) stocks in Central Ohio by integrating genetics from Ohio feral colonies.

== Breeding program ==
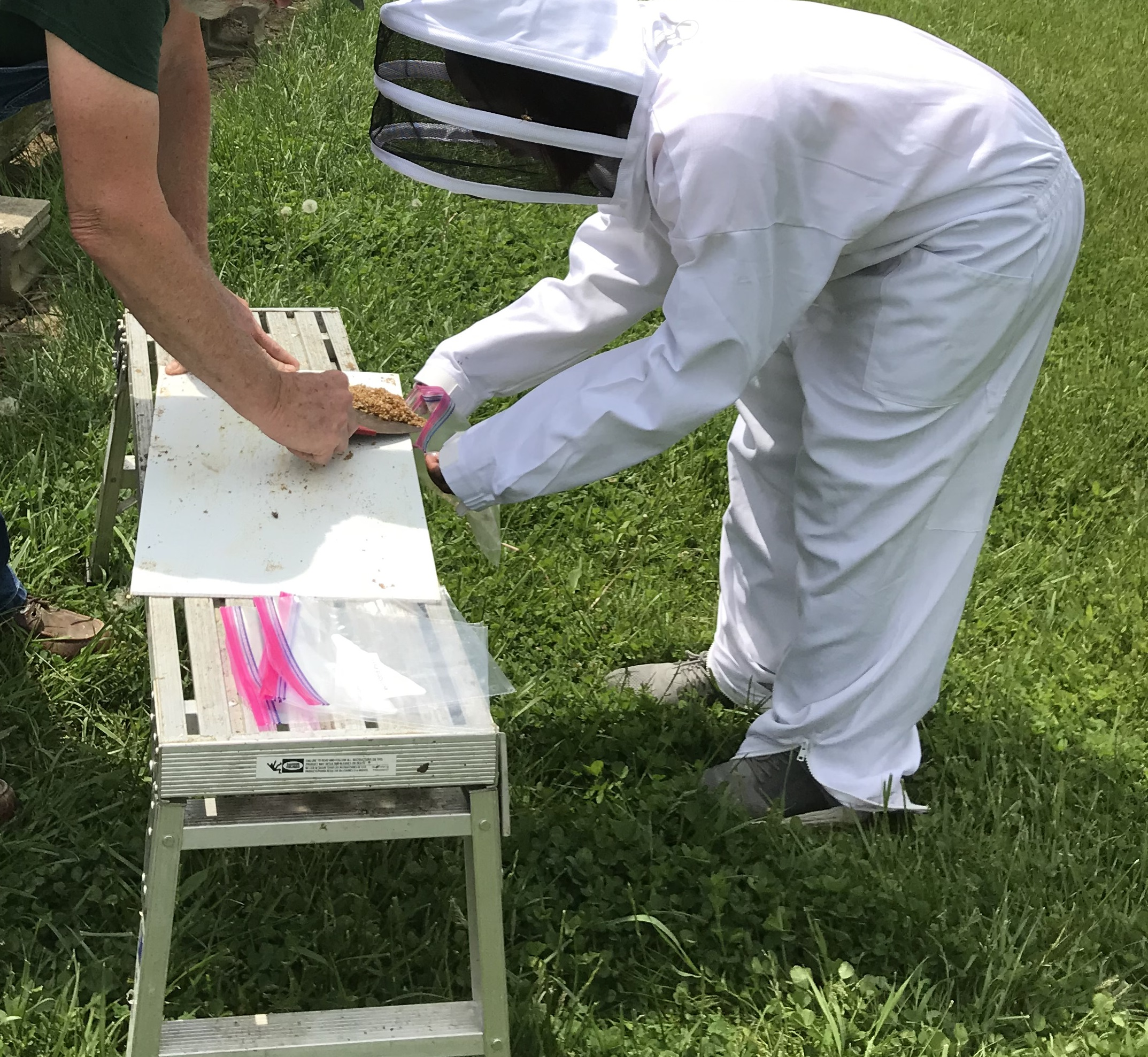
Collecting mites from the bottom board of a bee colony

Counting damaged mites is a method to measure the trait of mite-biting behavior in honey bee colonies. Procedures for mite counts include 1) collecting mites, 2) placing mites on microscope slides, 3) counting the number of mites, 4) observing mites for any damage under a microscope, and 5) summarizing the data for each colony.
