= Hexadecanethiol =

Names
- Preferred IUPAC name Hexadecane-1-thiol
- Other names 1-hexadecanethiol; hexadecyl mercaptan, 1-mercaptohexadecane, cetyl mercaptan

Identifiers
| CAS Number | 2917-26-2 |
| 3D model (JSmol) | Interactive image |
| ChemSpider | 17019 |
| ECHA InfoCard | 100.018.952 |
| PubChem CID | 18015 |
| UNII | QR98QIO1QL |
| CompTox Dashboard (EPA) | DTXSID6062709 |
- InChI: InChI=1S/C16H34S/c1-2-3-4-5-6-7-8-9-10-11-12-13-14-15-16-17/h17H,2-16H2,1H3 Key: ORTRWBYBJVGVQC-UHFFFAOYSA-N
- SMILES: CCCCCCCCCCCCCCCCS

Properties
| Chemical formula | C_{16}H_{34}S |
| Molar mass | 258.51 g·mol^{−1} |
| Appearance | Colorless liquid |
| Density | 0,85 g/cm^{3} |
| Melting point | 18–20 °C (64–68 °F; 291–293 K) |
| Boiling point | 334 °C (633 °F; 607 K) |
| Solubility in water | Insoluble |

Hazards
- GHS labelling
| Pictograms | (GHS07: Exclamation mark) |
| Signal word | Warning |
| Flash point | 135 °C (275 °F; 408 K) |
- Except where otherwise noted, data are given for materials in their standard state (at 25 °C [77 °F], 100 kPa). Infobox references

1-Hexadecanethiol is a chemical compound from the group of thiols. Its chemical formula is C_{16}H_{34}S.

== Synthesis ==
1-Hexadecanethiol can be obtained by reacting 1-bromohexadecane with thiourea.

== Properties ==
1-Hexadecanethiol is a combustible colorless liquid with an unpleasant odor, which is practically insoluble in water.

== Applications ==
1-Hexadecanethiol is used as a synthesis chemical. The compound is also used for the production of nanoparticles and hydrophobic self-assembling monolayers. The high affinity of the thiol group to the elements of the copper group causes the thiols to spontaneously deposit in a high-order layer when a corresponding metal of a 1-hexadecanethiol solution is exposed.

== Toxicology and safety ==
The substance decomposes upon combustion with the formation of toxic gases, including sulfur oxides. It reacts violently with strong oxidizing agents, acids, reducing agents, and metals.
