= C17H15O7 =

The chemical formula C_{17}H_{15}O_{7} (or C_{17}H_{15}O_{7}^{+}, molar mass : 331.2968 g/mol, exact mass :331.081778) may refer to:

- Europinidin, an anthocyanidin
- Malvidin, an anthocyanidin
