= Economic threshold =

In integrated pest management, the economic threshold is the density of a pest at which a control treatment will provide an economic return.

An economic Injuryis the insect's population level or extent of crop damage at which the value of the crop destroyed exceeds the cost of controlling the pest. Economic thresholds can be expressed in a variety of ways including the number of insects per plant or per square metre, the amount of leaf surface damage, etc. In many cases, thresholds have been established through scientific research. Because some combinations of pests and crops have not yet been studied, some thresholds are just educated estimates.
