= C16H12O7 =

The molecular formula C_{16}H_{12}O_{7} (molar mass: 316.26 g/mol, exact mass: 316.058303) may refer to:

- Azaleatin, a flavonol
- Isorhamnetin, a flavonol
- Nepetin, a flavone
- Rhamnetin, a flavonol
- Tamarixetin, a flavonol
