= C16H13O7 =

The molecular formula C_{16}H_{13}O_{7} (or C_{16}H_{13}O_{7}^{+}, molar mass : 317.27 g/mol, exact mass : 317.066127317) or C_{16}H_{13}ClO_{7} (exact mass : 352.03498) may refer to:

- Petunidin, an anthocyanidin
- Pulchellidin, an anthocyanidin
