= Acephenanthrylene =

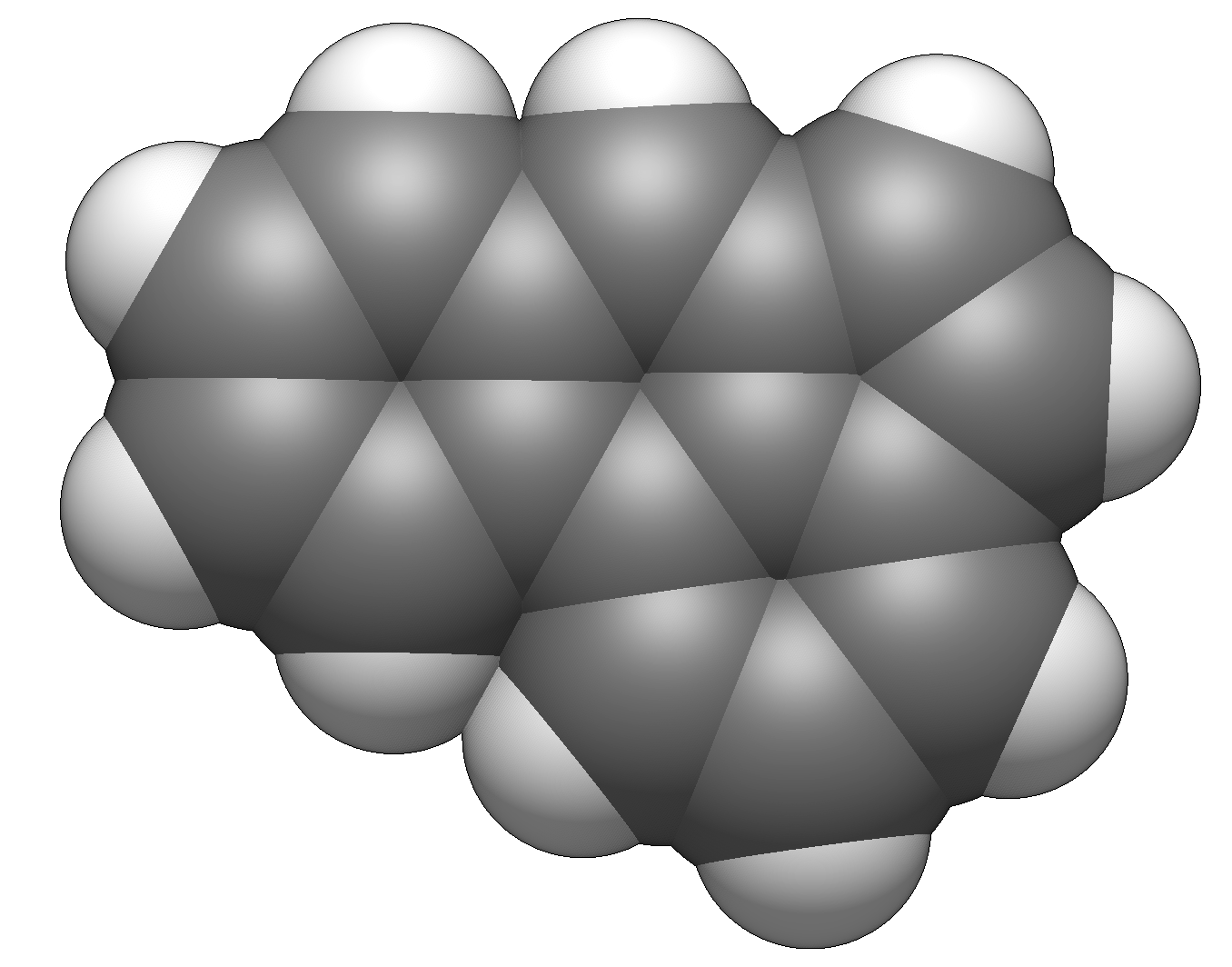

Names
- IUPAC name Acephenanthrylene
- Other names 4,5-Benzoacenaphthylene; Benz(e)acenaphthylene; Benzoacenaphthylene

Identifiers
CAS Number	201-06-9
3D model (JSmol)	Interactive image
Beilstein Reference	2247468
ChEBI	CHEBI:33085
ChemSpider	8789
PubChem CID	9143
UNII	FBV4SGU2RK
CompTox Dashboard (EPA)	DTXSID8075045
- InChI: InChI=1S/C16H10/c1-2-6-14-12(4-1)10-13-9-8-11-5-3-7-15(14)16(11)13/h1-10H Key: SQFPKRNUGBRTAR-UHFFFAOYSA-N
- SMILES: C1=CC=C2C(=C1)C=C3C=CC4=C3C2=CC=C4

Properties
Chemical formula	C_{16}H_{10}
Molar mass	202.256 g·mol^{−1}

Related compounds
Related compounds	Acenaphthylene
- Except where otherwise noted, data are given for materials in their standard state (at 25 °C [77 °F], 100 kPa). Infobox references

Acephenanthrylene is a tetracyclic polycyclic aromatic hydrocarbon.

== Properties and occurrence ==
Acephenanthrylene is one of the polycyclic aromatic hydrocarbons formed in combustion of various fuels. However, it is not present as an atmospheric pollutant because its vinylic bridge makes it susceptible to photolytic oxidation once released into the atmosphere.

== Preparation ==
Acephenanthrylene has been prepared in 4 steps starting with cyclization of 4-(5-acenapthenyl)butyric acid.
