= Linderone =

Names
- Preferred IUPAC name 3-Hydroxy-4,5-dimethoxy-2-[(2E)-3-phenylprop-2-enoyl]cyclopenta-2,4-dien-1-one

Identifiers
CAS Number	1782-79-2
3D model (JSmol)	Interactive image
ChemSpider	10297676
PubChem CID	11208407
- InChI: InChI=1S/C16H14O5/c1-20-15-13(18)12(14(19)16(15)21-2)11(17)9-8-10-6-4-3-5-7-10/h3-9,17H,1-2H3/b9-8+ Key: IUTJITCLNLMFAJ-CMDGGOBGSA-N; InChI=1/C16H14O5/c1-20-15-13(18)12(14(19)16(15)21-2)11(17)9-8-10-6-4-3-5-7-10/h3-9,17H,1-2H3/b9-8+ Key: IUTJITCLNLMFAJ-CMDGGOBGBM
- SMILES: COC1=C(C(=O)C(=C(/C=C/c2ccccc2)O)C1=O)OC

Properties
Chemical formula	C_{16}H_{14}O_{5}
Molar mass	286.283 g·mol^{−1}
- Except where otherwise noted, data are given for materials in their standard state (at 25 °C [77 °F], 100 kPa). Infobox references

Linderone is a bio-active isolate of Lindera lucida.
