= C17H14O7 =

The molecular formula C_{17}H_{14}O_{7} (molar mass : 330.29 g/mol, exact mass : 330.073953) may refer to:

- Aflatoxin g2 (CAS number 7241-98-7)
- Cirsiliol, a flavone
- Eupalitin, a flavonol
- Morelosin (CAS number: 62008-19-9), a flavonol
- Ombuin, a flavonol
- Rhamnazin, a flavonol
- Tricin, a flavone
