= Benzoylferrocene =

Chemical compound

Names
- IUPAC name Ferrocenyl(phenyl)methanone
- Other names Benzoylferrocene; Ferrocenyl phenyl ketone

Identifiers
CAS Number	1272-44-2
3D model (JSmol)	Interactive image
ChemSpider	92663
ECHA InfoCard	100.013.686
EC Number	215-054-2
PubChem CID	102591
CompTox Dashboard (EPA)	DTXSID30275981
- InChI: InChI=1S/C12H9O.C5H5.Fe/c13-12(11-8-4-5-9-11)10-6-2-1-3-7-10;1-2-4-5-3-1;/h1-9H;1-5H;/q2*-1;+2 Key: PWUMGRPMAGSFJU-UHFFFAOYSA-N
- SMILES: [CH-]1C=CC=C1.[CH-]1C=CC=C1C(=O)C2=CC=CC=C2.[Fe+2]

Properties
Chemical formula	C_{17}H_{14}FeO
Molar mass	290.143 g·mol^{−1}
- Except where otherwise noted, data are given for materials in their standard state (at 25 °C [77 °F], 100 kPa). Infobox references

Benzoylferrocene (also known as ferrocenyl phenyl ketone) is a chemical. Its formula is C_{17}H_{14}FeO. Little experimental data is available for this compound. It was first produced in 1961 by Karl Schlögl et al., along with several other ferrocene derivatives.
