= Fenethazine =

Chemical compound

Clinical data
- Other names: Phenethazinum, Phenethazine, Phenetazine; RP-3015, SC-1627, WY-1143

Identifiers
- IUPAC name: N,N-Dimethyl-2-phenothiazin-10-ylethanamine
- CAS Number: 522-24-7
- PubChem CID: 68223
- ChemSpider: 61526
- UNII: 8J97CUZ4HX
- KEGG: D02602
- ChEMBL: ChEMBL2106299
- CompTox Dashboard (EPA): DTXSID30200233
- ECHA InfoCard: 100.007.570

Chemical and physical data
- Formula: C_{16}H_{18}N_{2}S
- Molar mass: 270.39 g·mol^{−1}
- 3D model (JSmol): Interactive image
- SMILES: CN(C)CCN1C2=CC=CC=C2SC3=CC=CC=C31
- InChI: InChI=1S/C16H18N2S/c1-17(2)11-12-18-13-7-3-5-9-15(13)19-16-10-6-4-8-14(16)18/h3-10H,11-12H2,1-2H3; Key:PFAXACNYGZVKMX-UHFFFAOYSA-N

Fenethazine (INN; brand names Anergen, Contralergial, Ethysine, Etisine, Lisergan, Lysergan; former developmental codes RP-3015, SC-1627, and WY-1143; also known as phenethazine) is a first-generation antihistamine of the phenothiazine group. Promethazine and chlorpromazine, were derived from fenethazine. Fenethazine, in turn, was derived from phenbenzamine.
