= Flumethrin =

Names
- IUPAC name Cyano(4-fluoro-3-phenoxyphenyl)methyl 3-[2-chloro-2-(4-chlorophenyl)vinyl]-2,2-dimethylcyclopropanecarboxylate

Identifiers
CAS Number	69770-45-2
3D model (JSmol)	Interactive image
ChEMBL	ChEMBL2107248
ChemSpider	82804
ECHA InfoCard	100.067.352
PubChem CID	91702
UNII	2O051W13LH
CompTox Dashboard (EPA)	DTXSID8058166
- InChI: InChI=1S/C28H22Cl2FNO3/c1-28(2)21(15-22(30)17-8-11-19(29)12-9-17)26(28)27(33)35-25(16-32)18-10-13-23(31)24(14-18)34-20-6-4-3-5-7-20/h3-15,21,25-26H,1-2H3 Key: YXWCBRDRVXHABN-UHFFFAOYSA-N; InChI=1/C28H22Cl2FNO3/c1-28(2)21(15-22(30)17-8-11-19(29)12-9-17)26(28)27(33)35-25(16-32)18-10-13-23(31)24(14-18)34-20-6-4-3-5-7-20/h3-15,21,25-26H,1-2H3 Key: YXWCBRDRVXHABN-UHFFFAOYAZ
- SMILES: ClC(=CC3C(C(=O)OC(C#N)c2ccc(F)c(Oc1ccccc1)c2)C3(C)C)c4ccc(Cl)cc4

Properties
Chemical formula	C_{28}H_{22}Cl_{2}FNO_{3}
Molar mass	510.39 g·mol^{−1}

Pharmacology
ATCvet code	QP53AC05 (WHO)
- Except where otherwise noted, data are given for materials in their standard state (at 25 °C [77 °F], 100 kPa). Infobox references

Flumethrin is a pyrethroid insecticide and acaricide. It is used externally in veterinary medicine against parasitic insects and ticks on cattle, sheep, goats, horses, and dogs, and the treatment of parasitic mites in honeybee colonies.

== Chemistry ==
Flumethrin is a complex mixture of stereoisomers. The molecule contains three asymmetric carbon atoms, there is cis-trans isomerism at the cyclopropane ring, and E/Z isomerism at the carbon-carbon double bond of the alkene. So there are 16 different isomers. Commercial flumethrin typically contains 92% of the trans isomers on the cyclopropane ring and the Z configuration at the olefinic carbon-carbon double bond and 8% of the isomer with cis geometry on the cyclopropane ring and the Z configuration at the olefinic carbon-carbon double bond.

== Uses ==
Flumethrin is used in products, such as flea and tick collars, to protect pets against fleas.

It is also used in the proprietary product, ″Bayvarol″, ″Polyvar Yellow″ which are veterinary treatments used by beekeepers against the parasitic mite Varroa destructor.

== See also ==
- Acaricide
- Pyrethroid
- Varroa destructor
- Diseases of the honey bee
