= Melicopidine =

Chemical compound

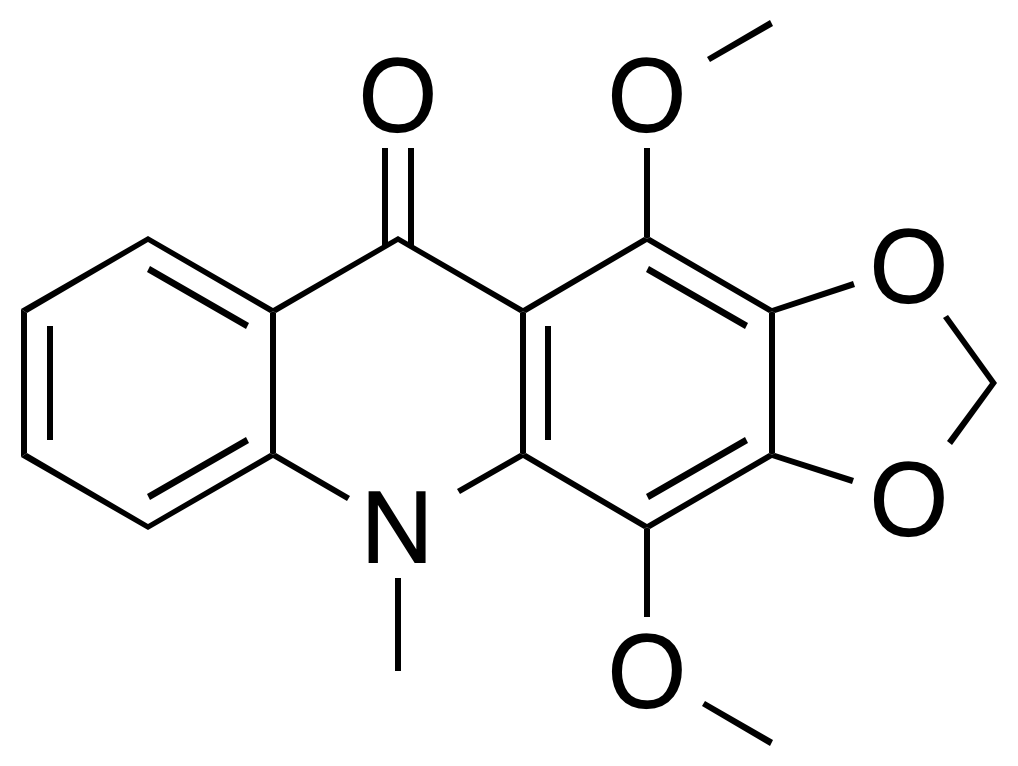

Names
- Preferred IUPAC name 4,11-dimethoxy-5-methyl-[1,3]dioxolo[4,5-b]acridin-10-one

Identifiers
CAS Number	475-91-2
3D model (JSmol)	Interactive image
ChEBI	CHEBI:167835
ChEMBL	ChEMBL1864207
ChemSpider	61375
ECHA InfoCard	100.006.821
EC Number	207-502-0
PubChem CID	68060
UNII	38R6F4CJ0M
CompTox Dashboard (EPA)	DTXSID3075410
- InChI: InChI=1S/C17H15NO5/c1-18-10-7-5-4-6-9(10)13(19)11-12(18)15(21-3)17-16(14(11)20-2)22-8-23-17/h4-7H,8H2,1-3H3 Key: TZZNUDMEMFBPQI-UHFFFAOYSA-N
- SMILES: CN1C2=CC=CC=C2C(=O)C3=C1C(=C4C(=C3OC)OCO4)OC

Properties
Chemical formula	C_{17}H_{15}NO_{5}
Molar mass	313.309 g·mol^{−1}

Hazards
- Lethal dose or concentration (LD, LC)
LD_{Lo} (lowest published)	200 mg/kg (mouse)
- Except where otherwise noted, data are given for materials in their standard state (at 25 °C [77 °F], 100 kPa). Infobox references

Melicopidine is an alkaloid. Its formula is C_{17}H_{15}NO_{5}. It, along with melicopine and melicopicine, is named for the Australian rutaceae (Melicope fareana) from which it was first isolated.

== Occurrence ==
As an alkaloid, melicopidine naturally occurs in and has been isolated from Medicosma fareana and Sarcomelicope megistophylla in addition to Melicope fareana.
