= Mefenacet =

Identifiers
CAS Number	73250-68-7
3D model (JSmol)	Interactive image
ChEBI	CHEBI:34830
ChEMBL	ChEMBL1592324
ChemSpider	82816
ECHA InfoCard	100.070.278
EC Number	277-328-8
KEGG	C14525
PubChem CID	91716
UNII	QI0QTA02DG
CompTox Dashboard (EPA)	DTXSID7058173
- InChI: InChI=1S/C16H14N2O2S/c1-18(12-7-3-2-4-8-12)15(19)11-20-16-17-13-9-5-6-10-14(13)21-16/h2-10H,11H2,1H3 Key: XIGAUIHYSDTJHW-UHFFFAOYSA-N
- SMILES: CN(C1=CC=CC=C1)C(=O)COC2=NC3=CC=CC=C3S2

Hazards
- GHS labelling
Pictograms	(GHS09: Environmental hazard)
Signal word	Warning
Hazard statements	H411
Precautionary statements	P273, P391, P501
- Except where otherwise noted, data are given for materials in their standard state (at 25 °C [77 °F], 100 kPa). Infobox references

Mefenacet is an active ingredient for crop protection belonging to the class of herbicides used for weed control.

== History ==
Mefenacet was first introduced to the market in Japan in 1987.

== Use ==
The active ingredient mefenacet is primarily used for weed control in ricefields. It is also applied to control grasses and weeds (including Cyperus and cockspur) in wheat, corn and field bean.

== Synthesis ==
The synthesis of mefenacet begins with 2-mercaptobenzothiazole and proceeds according to the following reaction sequence:

Mefenacet synthesis

== Trade name ==
A plant protection product containing the active ingredient mefenacet is marketed under the trade names Hinochloa and Rancho.

== Authorization ==
In the EU and Switzerland, crop protection products containing the active ingredient mefenacet are no longer authorized.

However, mefenacet is approved for agricultural use in Egypt, Japan, Korea, Vietnam and Taiwan.
