= Fluvalinate =

Insecticide and acaricide

- Fluvalinate molecular structure. Asterisks mark the chiral centers.

Clinical data
- Trade names: Apistan, Mavrik, others
- AHFS/Drugs.com: International Drug Names
- ATCvet code: QP53AC10 (WHO)

Identifiers
- IUPAC name: [Cyano-(3-phenoxyphenyl)methyl] 2-[2-chloro-4-(trifluoromethyl)anilino]-3-methylbutanoate
- CAS Number: 69409-94-5 102851-06-9 (tau-fluvalinate)
- PubChem CID: 50516
- ChemSpider: 45805
- UNII: 364G5G03VC
- KEGG: C10989
- ChEBI: CHEBI:5135
- ChEMBL: ChEMBL3185183
- CompTox Dashboard (EPA): DTXSID7024110
- ECHA InfoCard: 100.233.047

Chemical and physical data
- Formula: C_{26}H_{22}ClF_{3}N_{2}O_{3}
- Molar mass: 502.92 g·mol^{−1}
- 3D model (JSmol): Interactive image
- SMILES: CC(C)C(Nc1ccc(C(F)(F)F)cc1Cl)C(=O)OC(C#N)c1cccc(Oc2ccccc2)c1
- InChI: InChI=1S/C26H22ClF3N2O3/c1-16(2)24(32-22-12-11-18(14-21(22)27)26(28,29)30)25(33)35-23(15-31)17-7-6-10-20(13-17)34-19-8-4-3-5-9-19/h3-14,16,23-24,32H,1-2H3; Key:INISTDXBRIBGOC-UHFFFAOYSA-N

Fluvalinate is a synthetic pyrethroid chemical compound contained as an active agent in the products Apistan, Klartan, and Minadox, that is an acaricide (specifically, a miticide), used to control Varroa mites in honey bee colonies, infestations that constitute a significant disease of such insects.

Fluvalinate is a stable, nonvolatile, viscous, heavy oil (technical) soluble in organic solvents.

== Health and Environmental Impacts ==
Fluvalinate is considered an acute toxic, health hazard and environmental hazard by ECHA (European Chemicals Agency).

The chemical is fatal if inhaled and is extremely toxic to aquatic life. Hazard codes indicate fluvalinate is both an acute and long-term toxic hazard in aquatic systems. It is considered a developmental hazard though there are no established chronic effects in adult humans.

Fluvalinate can be found in both honey and beeswax though it tends to migrate to beeswax over time due to its lipophilic nature.

Pesticide products containing fluvalinate have been banned in Denmark because the chemical can degrade into trifluoroacetic acid, which can then contaminate groundwater and not decompose.

== Stereoisomerism ==
Fluvalinate is synthesized from racemic valine [(RS)-valine]; the synthesis is not diastereoselective. Thus, fluvalinate is a mixture of four stereoisomers, each about 25%.

Fluvalinate stereoisomers
(R,R)-configuration	(S,S)-configuration
(S,R)-configuration	(R,S)-configuration

Tau-fluvalinate (τ-fluvalinate) is the trivial name for (2R)-fluvalinate. The C atom in the valinate structure is in (R)-absolute configuration, while the second chiral atom is a mixture of (R)- and (S)-configurations:

τ-Fluvalinate diastereomers
(R,R)-configuration	(R,S)-configuration

== See also ==
- Diseases of the honey bee
