= Butenachlor =

Weed control herbicide

Names
- Preferred IUPAC name N-{[(2Z)-But-2-en-1-yloxy]methyl}-2-chloro-N-(2,6-diethylphenyl)acetamide
- Other names: KH-218, KH 218, KH218; N-{[(2Z)-But-2-enyloxy]methyl}-2-chloro-2',6'-diethylacetanilide; (Z)-N-but-2-enyloxymethyl-2-chloro-2′,6′-diethylacetanilide

Identifiers
CAS Number	87310-56-3
3D model (JSmol)	Interactive image
ChemSpider	4951612
PubChem CID	6448437
UNII	W0EV45W87P
CompTox Dashboard (EPA)	DTXSID7058206
- InChI: InChI=1S/C17H24ClNO2/c1-4-7-11-21-13-19(16(20)12-18)17-14(5-2)9-8-10-15(17)6-3/h4,7-10H,5-6,11-13H2,1-3H3/b7-4- Key: InChIKey=HZDIJTXDRLNTIS-DAXSKMNVSA-N
- SMILES: N(COC/C=C\C)(C(CCl)=O)C1=C(CC)C=CC=C1CC

Properties
Chemical formula	C_{17}H_{24}ClNO_{2}
Molar mass	309.83 g·mol^{−1}
Appearance	Pale yellow liquid
Density	1.10 kg/L (11 lb/imp. gal)
Melting point	12.9 °C (55.2 °F; 286.0 K)
Boiling point	167 °C (333 °F; 440 K)
Solubility in water	29 mg/L
Vapor pressure	0.93 mPa (0.02 mpsf)

Hazards
- GHS labelling
Hazard statements	H302, H410
- Lethal dose or concentration (LD, LC)
LD_{50} (median dose)	>2000 mg/kg (rat); 1630 mg/kg
LC_{50} (median concentration)	3.34 mg/L (rat, breathing)
- Except where otherwise noted, data are given for materials in their standard state (at 25 °C [77 °F], 100 kPa). Infobox references

Butenachlor is an obsolete selective chloroacetanilide, chloroacetamide herbicide used to control grasses and broadleaf weeds. It was introduced in 1976 and marketed as "Diphenox", by Agro-Kanesho.

Butenachlor's mode of action is to prevent formation of very long chain fatty acids; this makes its HRAC classification Group J (Australia), Group K3 (global) and Group 15 (numeric).

It is stable in acidic, neutral or weakly alkaline conditions; it is unstable in sublight.

Butenachlor is applied at 0.75-1.0 kg/Ha, and usually sold as a pesticide formulation as granules (GR).

== Environmental behaviour ==
Butenachlor does not persist in soil; its soil half-life is 2 to 5 days. It is moderately toxic to fish, with a 96-hour LC_{50} of 0.48 mg/L (0.034 gr/imp. gal).

== Safety ==
Butenachlor's acute oral LD_{50} on rats is 1630 mg/kg (male rats) and 1875 mg/kg (female rates). In mice, it is much less harmful, with an LD_{50} about 6300 mg/kg. It is slightly irritating to skin and eyes. The inhalatory LC_{50} for rats is 3.34 mg/L of air over 4 hours. A 90 day NOEL is 25 mg/kg/day for dogs. Butenachlor is non-teratogenic, and has no evident reproductive effects.
