= Pratol =

Names
- IUPAC name 7-Hydroxy-4′-methoxyflavone
- Systematic IUPAC name 7-Hydroxy-2-(4-methoxyphenyl)-4H-1-benzopyran-4-one

Identifiers
CAS Number	487-24-1
3D model (JSmol)	Interactive image
ChemSpider	4478714
ECHA InfoCard	100.006.958
PubChem CID	5320693
UNII	KU5R959MO7
CompTox Dashboard (EPA)	DTXSID20197587
- InChI: InChI=1S/C16H12O4/c1-19-12-5-2-10(3-6-12)15-9-14(18)13-7-4-11(17)8-16(13)20-15/h2-9,17H,1H3 Key: SQVXWIUVAILQRH-UHFFFAOYSA-N; InChI=1/C16H12O4/c1-19-12-5-2-10(3-6-12)15-9-14(18)13-7-4-11(17)8-16(13)20-15/h2-9,17H,1H3 Key: SQVXWIUVAILQRH-UHFFFAOYAR
- SMILES: COC1=CC=C(C=C1)C2=CC(=O)C3=C(O2)C=C(C=C3)O

Properties
Chemical formula	C_{16}H_{12}O_{4}
Molar mass	268.26 g/mol
- Except where otherwise noted, data are given for materials in their standard state (at 25 °C [77 °F], 100 kPa). Infobox references

Pratol is a flavonoid, 4′-O-methylated 4′,7-dihydroxyflavone. It can be found in Trifolium pratense.
