= Bromopropylate =

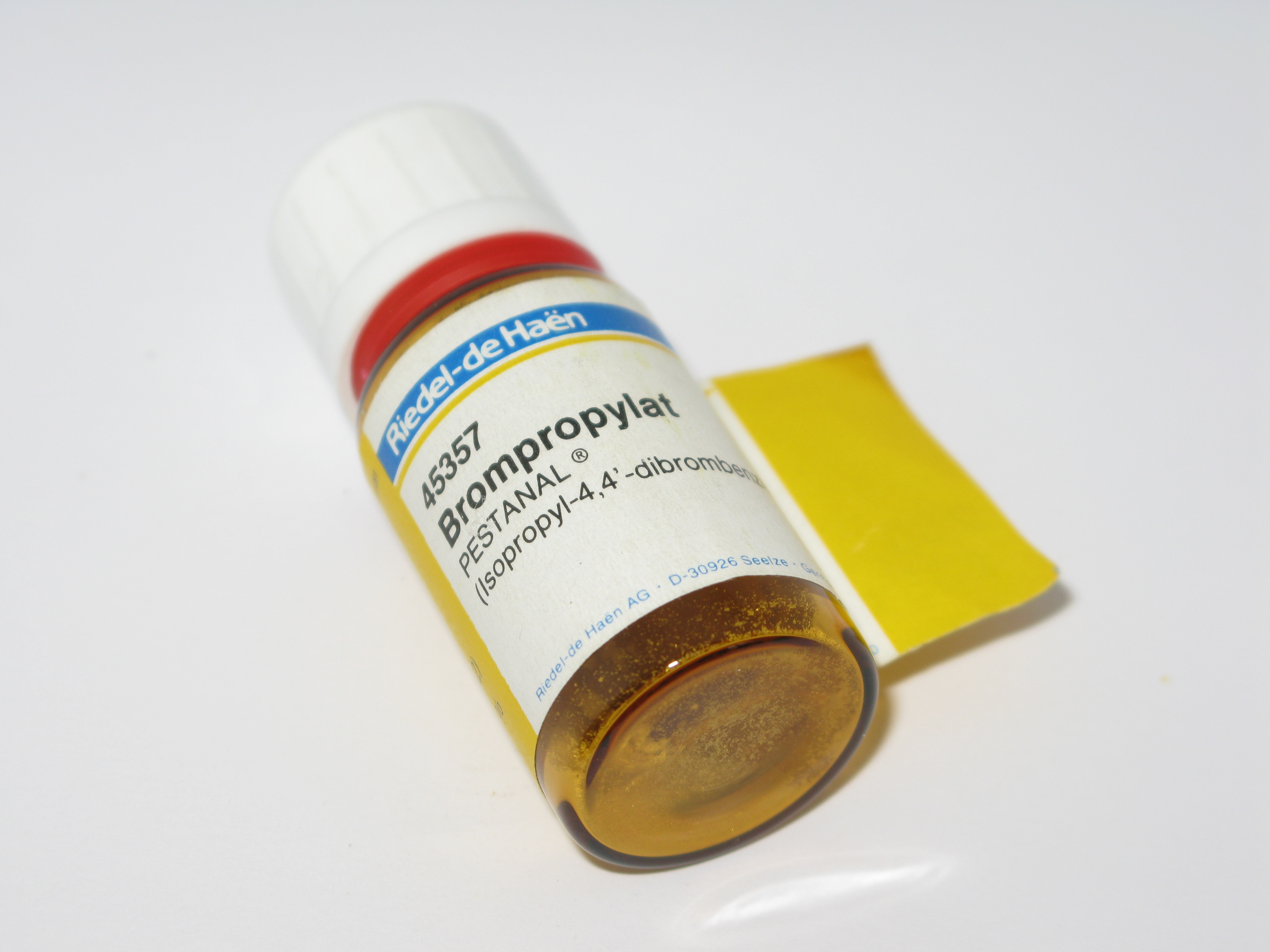

Names
- Preferred IUPAC name Propan-2-yl bis(4-bromophenyl)hydroxyacetate
- Other names Acarol; Isopropyl 4,4'-dibromobenzilate; Phenisobromolate

Identifiers
| CAS Number | 18181-80-1 |
| 3D model (JSmol) | Interactive image |
| ChemSpider | 26916 |
| ECHA InfoCard | 100.038.231 |
| PubChem CID | 28936 |
| UNII | 3U468ZM257 |
| CompTox Dashboard (EPA) | DTXSID1034397 |
- InChI: InChI=1S/C17H16Br2O3/c1-11(2)22-16(20)17(21,12-3-7-14(18)8-4-12)13-5-9-15(19)10-6-13/h3-11,21H,1-2H3 Key: FOANIXZHAMJWOI-UHFFFAOYSA-N; InChI=1/C17H16Br2O3/c1-11(2)22-16(20)17(21,12-3-7-14(18)8-4-12)13-5-9-15(19)10-6-13/h3-11,21H,1-2H3 Key: FOANIXZHAMJWOI-UHFFFAOYAR
- SMILES: Brc1ccc(cc1)C(O)(c2ccc(Br)cc2)C(=O)OC(C)C

Properties
| Chemical formula | C_{17}H_{16}Br_{2}O_{3} |
| Molar mass | 428.120 g·mol^{−1} |
| Appearance | White solid |
| Density | 1.59 g/cm^{3} (20 °C) |
| Melting point | 77 °C (171 °F; 350 K) |
| Solubility in water | 0.1 mg/L (20 °C) |
- Except where otherwise noted, data are given for materials in their standard state (at 25 °C [77 °F], 100 kPa). Infobox references

Bromopropylate is a chemical compound used as an acaricide against spider mites in apiaries and on fruit crops such as citrus and grapes. It was banned by the European Union in 2011.

== Preparation ==
Bromopropylate is prepared by the esterification of the 4,4'-dibromo derivative of benzilic acid with isopropanol.

== Gallery ==
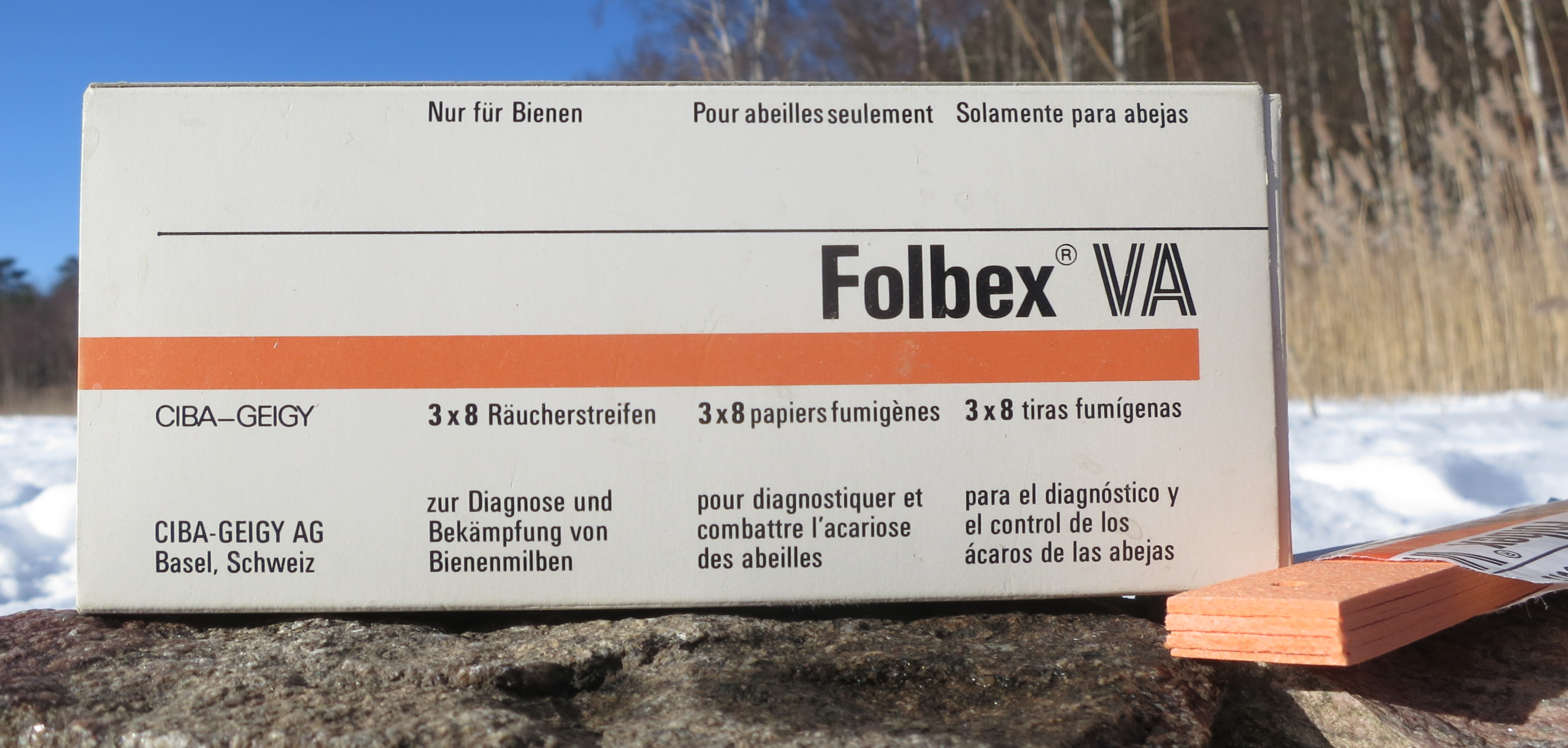
Bromopropylate-based fumigant strips from the early 1990s for honeybee mite diagnosis and control.
