= Hexadecanal =

Chemical compound

Names
- IUPAC name hexadecanal
- Other names Hexadecanal; AI3-24252; EINECS 211-111-0; UNII-WQD27655QE

Identifiers
CAS Number	629-80-1
3D model (JSmol)	Interactive image
Beilstein Reference	1772756
ChEBI	CHEBI:17600
ChEMBL	ChEMBL1235338
ChemSpider	959
DrugBank	DB03381
ECHA InfoCard	100.010.102
EC Number	211-111-0
Gmelin Reference	722456
IUPHAR/BPS	6627
KEGG	C00517
PubChem CID	984
UNII	WQD27655QE
CompTox Dashboard (EPA)	DTXSID5042039
- InChI: InChI=1S/C16H32O/c1-2-3-4-5-6-7-8-9-10-11-12-13-14-15-16-17/h16H,2-15H2,1H3 Key: NIOYUNMRJMEDGI-UHFFFAOYSA-N
- SMILES: CCCCCCCCCCCCCCCC=O

Properties
Chemical formula	C_{16}H_{32}O
Molar mass	240.428 g/mol

Hazards
- GHS labelling
Pictograms	(GHS07: Exclamation mark)
Signal word	Warning
Hazard statements	H315, H319, H335
Precautionary statements	P261, P264, P271, P280, P302+P352, P304+P340, P305+P351+P338, P312, P321, P332+P313, P337+P313, P362, P403+P233, P405, P501
- Except where otherwise noted, data are given for materials in their standard state (at 25 °C [77 °F], 100 kPa). Infobox references

Hexadecanal is an organic compound with the chemical formula C_{16}H_{32}O.

== In biology ==
Hexadecanal is found in human skin, saliva, and feces. It has a calming effect on mice.

A 2017 study found that non-autistic men demonstrate an increase in electrodermal activity when exposed to subliminal levels of hexadecanal while men with autism spectrum disorder do not.

In 2021, inhalation of hexadecanal was found to reduce aggression in men but to trigger aggression in women. Hexadecanal is one of the most abundant substances emitted by human babies from their heads, which may be an evolutionary survival mechanism to induce mothers to defend the baby and fathers to not attack it. But it is not yet known whether the amount of hexadecanal emitted by humans is sufficient to affect other humans.
