= Bumblebee communication =

Communication between bumblebees

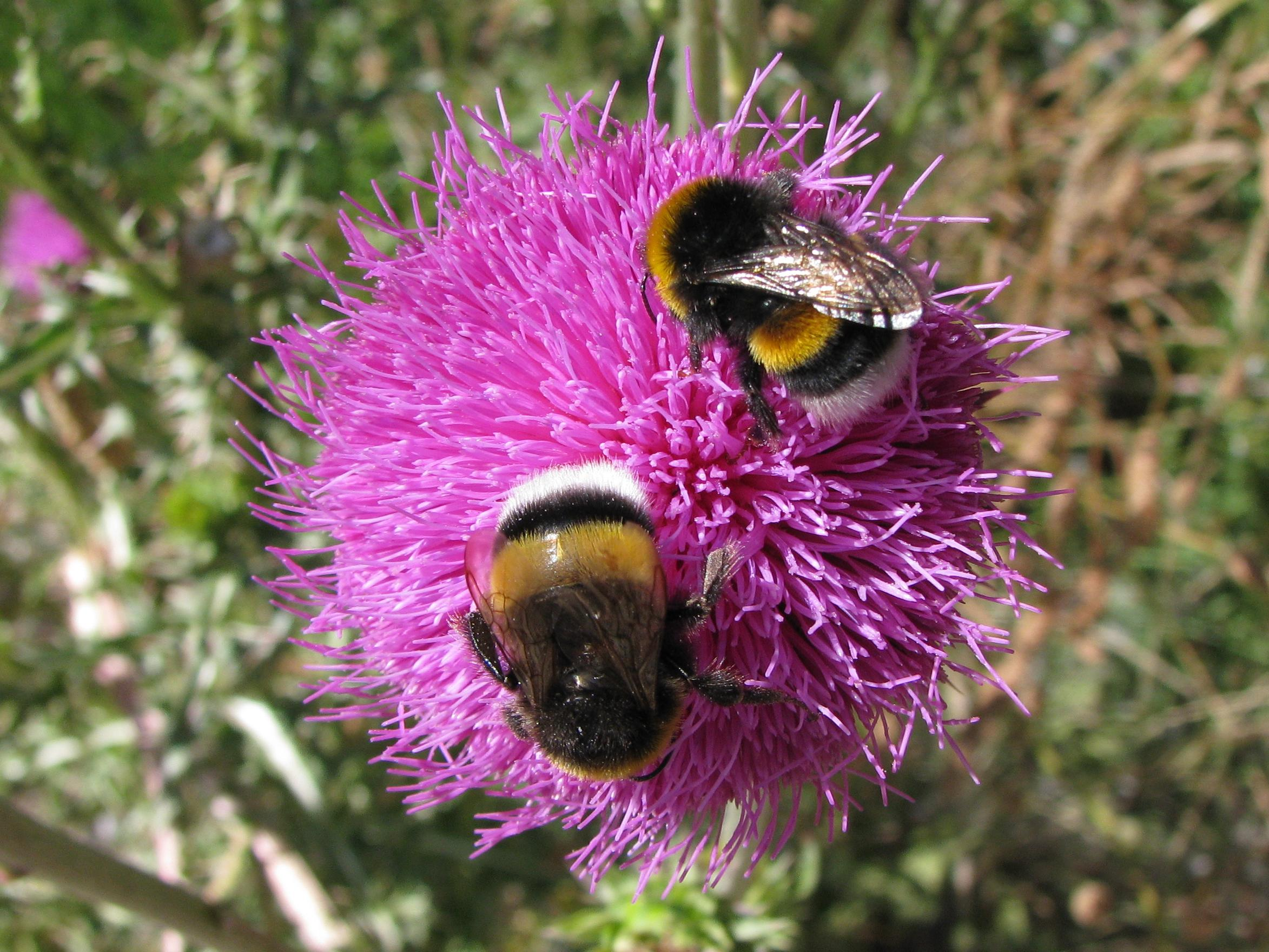
Two bumblebees foraging on a flower, taken at Bariloche, Argentina

Bumblebees (Bombus spp.), like the honeybee (Apis spp.) collect nectar and pollen from flowers and store them for food. Many individuals must be recruited to forage for food to provide for the hive. Some bee species have highly developed ways of communicating with each other about the location and quality of food resources ranging from physical to chemical displays.

While honey bees are known for their specialized dances, such as the waggle dance which recruit other bees to the precise location of the food source, bumblebees are not capable of transmitting this type of detailed information. Instead, the nest serves as a hub where bees receive information about the foraging bouts of her conspecifics. Differences between the communication methods of honeybees and bumblebees are mainly due to differences in colony size and nest structure. Bumblebees are distinct from honeybees because they lack receiver bees (bees in the nest which receive pollen and nectar from incoming foragers during unloading) and are not capable of trophallaxis (the transfer of nectar from one bee to another). They deposit collected nectar directly into the honey pots and don't share information of the quality of the resource with other bees through nectar transfer. Another bee may sample the nectar brought into the nest, and if the colony is in need of food or the nectar is high quality she will likely go out foraging herself. Other means of alerting passive bees to a potentially rewarding resource include releasing pheromone signals and increasing physical activity.

For information on communication methods in honey bees, see bee learning and communication.

== Monitoring honey pots ==
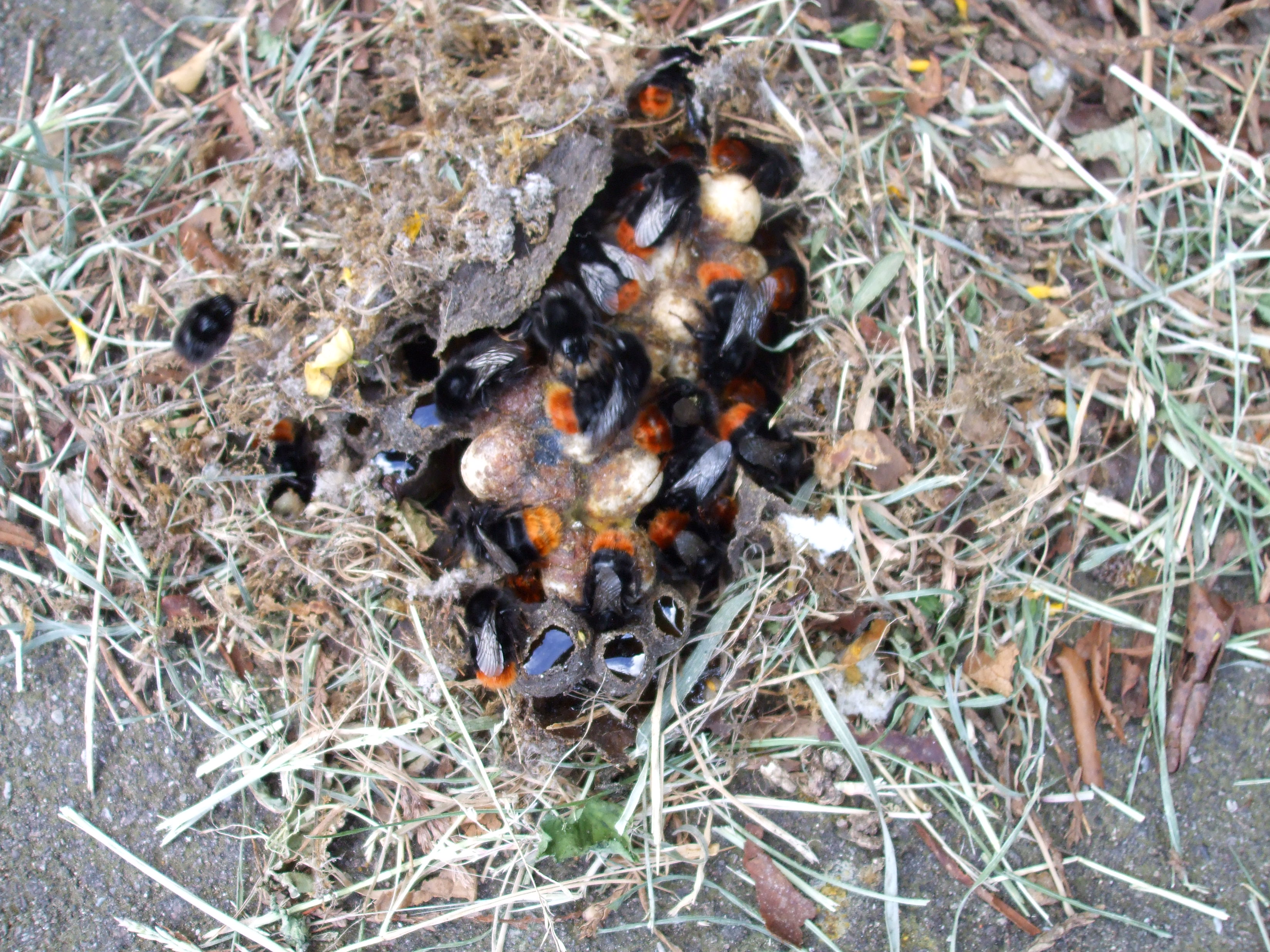
Bumblebee nest with full visible honey pots

A bumblebee nest differs in size and structure from that of a honeybee. Bumblebee nests are smaller and contain far fewer individuals which is mostly due to differences in the method of colony reproduction. Honeybee colonies can contain up to 50,000 individuals, whereas bumblebee colonies usually only contain a few hundred. This means the number of bees available for foraging is low and resources must be allocated accordingly. Assessing the level of food stores is not seen in honeybees, likely because the large colonies make such assessment inefficient. Bumblebees only store enough honey for a few days. By monitoring the levels of the honey pots a bumblebee colony can either up or down regulate the number of bees out foraging. Lab experiments by Anna Dornhaus and Lars Chittka in 2005 showed evidence of this up or down regulation by monitoring the activity level of the hive after the addition of 'nectar' to the honey pots. Hive activity increased when high quality nectar was injected into the honey pots, provided the wells weren't already full. When the honey pots were full, there was no significant change in activity regardless of whether the nectar imported was from a high or low quality source. They hypothesized that either the foraging bee does not signal the nest or the nest bees ignore the signal because the demand for food is low. The tropical bumblebee Bombus transversalis has also been shown to respond to honey pot levels in a similar way.

== Excited runs ==
Honeybees have very controlled patterns of movement, such as the waggle or tremble dance which serve to deliver specific coordinates of fruitful sources to potential foragers. Bumblebee movement is comparatively random and does not supply coordinates to other bees. Other experiments by Dornhaus and Chittka (2001) showed increased movement of successful foraging bees upon returning to the nest. Successful bees ran faster and longer compared to unsuccessful bees. A bee may spend several minutes running around the nest before flying out again. As the bee runs, it has been hypothesized that the bee may also offer a form of communication based on the buzzing sounds made from her wings. These 'excited' runs serve in part to rouse other bees into foraging.

== Pheromones ==
=== Pheromone distribution ===
Bumblebees produce a signalling pheromone from tergal glands located on their dorsal abdomen as discovered in experiments performed by A. Dornhaus, A. Brockmann and L. Chittka in 2003. They monitored the activity of bee colonies after exposure to products from several glands located along the bee's body. The only one yielding significant changes in activity level came from the tergites VI and VII. This is similar to a pheromone produced from the Nasanov gland in honeybees, but differs in the active compound. It has been suggested that this pheromone may facilitate learning of floral scents, since its release is coupled with the import of the floral scent from the nectar collected by the successful forager. Experiments by Molet, Chittka and Raine in 2009 showed that bumblebees may be able to learn floral scents associated with rewarding flowers better if the particular scent is found in nectar deposited in the honeypots.

=== Brood recognition pheromones ===
Many bumblebee species have been observed to use pheromones in the process of brood recognition. In the species Bombus vosnesenskii, brood recognition, and subsequently, brood clump incubation, has been shown to be pheromone induced. Queens will deposit chemical signals on a brood clump to help herself and her workers identify the eggs. However, these pheromones appear to be species' specific, as opposed to specific to individual queens, as queens will also incubate the eggs of conspecific bees.

=== Queen pheromones ===
As in other social Hymenoptera, bumblebee queens have also been shown to release characteristic pheromones to signal their presence and stop the workers from reproducing. In Bombus terrestris, for example, two studies have shown that workers resorbed oocytes more often and had fewer developing oocytes in their ovaries after treatment with the queen-characteristic cuticular hydrocarbon pentacosane. Similar activity of queen-specific cuticular hydrocarbons has also been documented in Bombus impatiens, as well as in several other species of ants and wasps.
