= Lars Chittka =

German zoologist, ethologist and ecologist

Professor Lars Chittka
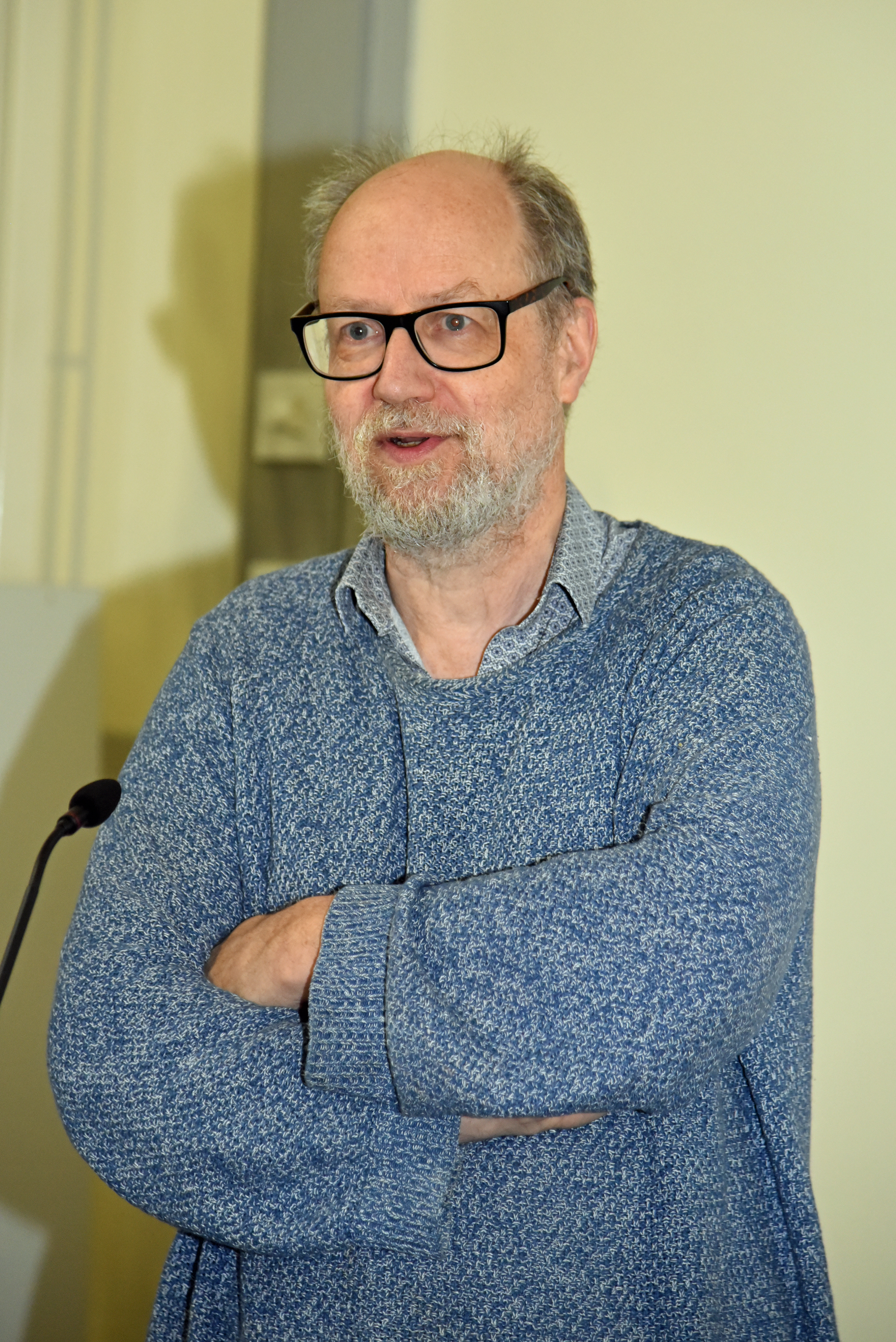
- Chittka in 2025
- Born: April 1963 (age 63); Bad Homburg vor der Höhe, Germany
- Education: Free University of Berlin University of Göttingen
- Scientific career
- Fields: Neuroethology, behavioural ecology, sensory systems, comparative cognition
- Workplaces: Queen Mary University of London University of Würzburg Stony Brook University Free University of Berlin
- Doctoral advisor: Randolf Menzel
- Other academic advisors: Bert Hölldobler
- Website: chittkalab.sbcs.qmul.ac.uk; twitter.com/lchittka

Lars Chittka, FRS, FLS, FRES, FRSB (born April 1963) is a German zoologist, ethologist and ecologist distinguished for his work on the evolution of sensory systems and cognition, using insect-flower interactions as a model.

== Life and career ==
Born in Germany, Chittka studied Biology at the Georg-August-Universität Göttingen and the Free University of Berlin. He obtained his PhD degree under the supervision of Randolf Menzel at the Free University of Berlin. Chittka is a recipient of the Royal Society Wolfson Research Merit Award and an Advanced Fellowship from the European Research Council (ERC). He is also member of the German National Academy of Sciences Leopoldina, an elected Fellow of the Linnean Society (FLS), the Royal Entomological Society (FRES) as well as the Royal Society of Biology (FRSB). He received the Lesley Goodman Award of the Royal Entomological Society in 2006. Lars Chittka has been an Editor of Biology's foremost open access journal PLoS Biology since 2004, and has also been on the Editorial Board of Proceedings of the Royal Society of London Series B (2010–2012) and the Quarterly Review of Biology (2004–2010); he is a member of the Faculty of 1000, (now known as Faculty Opinions) and was a Panel Chairman for the European Research Council (2010–2013). He is also the founder of the Research Centre for Psychology at Queen Mary University of London, where he is a Professor of Sensory and Behavioural Ecology. He was elected a Fellow of the Royal Society in 2026.

== Research achievements ==
Chittka has carried out extensive work on the behaviour, cognition and ecology of bumblebees and honeybees, and their interactions with flowers. He developed perceptual models of animal colour vision, allowing the derivation of optimal receiver systems as well as a quantification of the evolutionary pressures shaping flower signals. Chittka also made fundamental contributions to the understanding of animal cognition and its fitness benefits in the economy of nature. He explored phenomena such as numerosity, speed-accuracy trade-offs, false memories and social learning in bees. His discoveries have made a substantial impact on the understanding of animal intelligence and its neural-computational underpinnings. He has published over 250 peer-reviewed articles, many of them highly cited.

== Science, music and art ==
Chittka has been involved in a number of collaborative works linking the science of bees with music and art. With musicians Katie Green and Rob Alexander, he formed the band Killer Bee Queens. In 2019, they released the post-punk inspired concept album Strange Flowers on Bandcamp. Two music videos were published; "I stung Gwyneth Paltrow" referred to the pseudoscientific method of bee stings as a treatment for minor skin conditions, as advocated by the actress. The video for "The Beekeeper's Dream" used footage from David Blair's 1991 surrealist film "Wax or the Discovery of Television Among the Bees".

Chittka also worked with installation artist Julian Walker on a project in which live bees' responses to famous paintings were evaluated ("Do Bees Like Van Gogh's Sunflowers?"). Chittka and Walker explained that they used "this unconventional approach in the hope to raise awareness for between-species differences in visual perception, and to provoke thinking about the implications of biology in human aesthetics and the relationship between object representation and its biological connotations."

Data collected by Chittka's team on the life-long radar-tracking of individual bumblebees' flights formed the basis for artwork by Lucy Pullen which was on display at the Perimeter Institute for Theoretical Physics from 2018-2020. Some of the images are now in a collection of the Royal Bank of Canada, Toronto.

Chittka also contributed to a science-music project with artist Aladin Borioli, called "Shared Sensibilities" in which sections of an interview about Chittka's research were combined with the music of Laurent Güdel and the sounds of honeybees, aired on BBC Radio 6 in 2020.

== Bibliography ==
=== Journal articles: most highly cited ===
- Briscoe, Adriana D.; Chittka, Lars (January 2001). "The evolution of color vision in insects". Annual Review of Entomology. 46 (1): 471–510. doi:10.1146/annurev.ento.46.1.471. PMID 11112177.
- Chittka, Lars; Thomson, James D.; Waser, Nickolas M. (3 August 1999). "Flower Constancy, Insect Psychology, and Plant Evolution". Naturwissenschaften. 86 (8): 361–377. Bibcode:1999NW.....86..361C. doi:10.1007/s001140050636. S2CID 27377784.
- Chittka, Lars (June 1992). "The colour hexagon: a chromaticity diagram based on photoreceptor excitations as a generalized representation of colour opponency". Journal of Comparative Physiology A. 170 (5). doi:10.1007/BF00199331. S2CID 2016607.
- Chittka, L.; Schürkens, S. (June 2001). "Successful invasion of a floral market". Nature. 411 (6838): 653. Bibcode:2001Natur.411..653C. doi:10.1038/35079676. PMID 11395755. S2CID 5107467.
- Chittka, Lars; Shmida, Avi; Troje, Nikolaus; Menzel, Randolf (June 1994). "Ultraviolet as a component of flower reflections, and the colour perception of hymenoptera". Vision Research. 34 (11): 1489–1508. Bibcode:1994VisRe..34.1489C. doi:10.1016/0042-6989(94)90151-1. PMID 8023461. S2CID 15865257.

=== Journal articles: recent ===
- Alem, Sylvain; Perry, Clint J.; Zhu, Xingfu; Loukola, Olli J.; Ingraham, Thomas; Søvik, Eirik; Chittka, Lars (4 October 2016). "Associative Mechanisms Allow for Social Learning and Cultural Transmission of String Pulling in an Insect". PLOS Biology. 14 (10) e1002564. doi:10.1371/journal.pbio.1002564. PMC 5049772. PMID 27701411.
- Clare, Elizabeth L; Schiestl, Florian P; Leitch, Andrew R; Chittka, Lars (June 2013). "The promise of genomics in the study of plant-pollinator interactions". Genome Biology. 14 (6): 207. Bibcode:2013GenBi..14..207C. doi:10.1186/gb-2013-14-6-207. PMC 3707021. PMID 23796166.
- Solvi, Cwyn; Baciadonna, Luigi; Chittka, Lars (30 September 2016). "Unexpected rewards induce dopamine-dependent positive emotion–like state changes in bumblebees". Science. 353 (6307): 1529–1531. Bibcode:2016Sci...353.1529P. doi:10.1126/science.aaf4454. PMID 27708101. S2CID 21907354.
- Woodgate, Joseph L.; Makinson, James C.; Lim, Ka S.; Reynolds, Andrew M.; Chittka, Lars (4 August 2016). "Life-Long Radar Tracking of Bumblebees". PLOS ONE. 11 (8) e0160333. Bibcode:2016PLoSO..1160333W. doi:10.1371/journal.pone.0160333. PMC 4973990. PMID 27490662.

=== Books ===
- Chittka, Lars; Thomson, James D., eds. (2001). Cognitive Ecology of Pollination: Animal Behaviour and Floral Evolution. Cambridge University Press. ISBN 978-1-139-43004-3.
- Chittka, Lars (2022). The Mind of a Bee. Princeton University Press. ISBN 978-0-691-18047-2.
