= James L. Gould =

American biologist

- Born: July 31, 1945 (age 81)
- Education: California Institute of Technology, Rockefeller University
- Known for: Proving bees communicate via dances
- Scientific career
- Fields: Ethology, evolutionary biology
- Workplaces: Princeton University

James L. Gould (born July 31, 1945) is an American ethologist, evolutionary biologist, and popular science writer. He has served as a professor of ecology and evolutionary biology at Princeton University since receiving his PhD in 1975. However, he is primarily known for the experiment he designed while an undergraduate at Caltech which proved that bees use complex dances to communicate the location of food. In addition to several technical works and textbooks, he co-wrote with his wife the popular science book The Honey Bee.

Gould went on to do work that further specialized in communication in southern right whales. He also published studies that made serious contributions to the ethological understanding of animal navigation and sexual selection.

During his long career at Princeton, Gould has been dedicated to teaching as well as research. Notably, he taught introductory biology and animal behavior courses, as well as field courses in marine biology.

== Selected publications ==
- The Honey Bee (1988)
- Animal Architects: Building and the Evolution of Intelligence (2007)
