= Ant communication =

How ants communicate

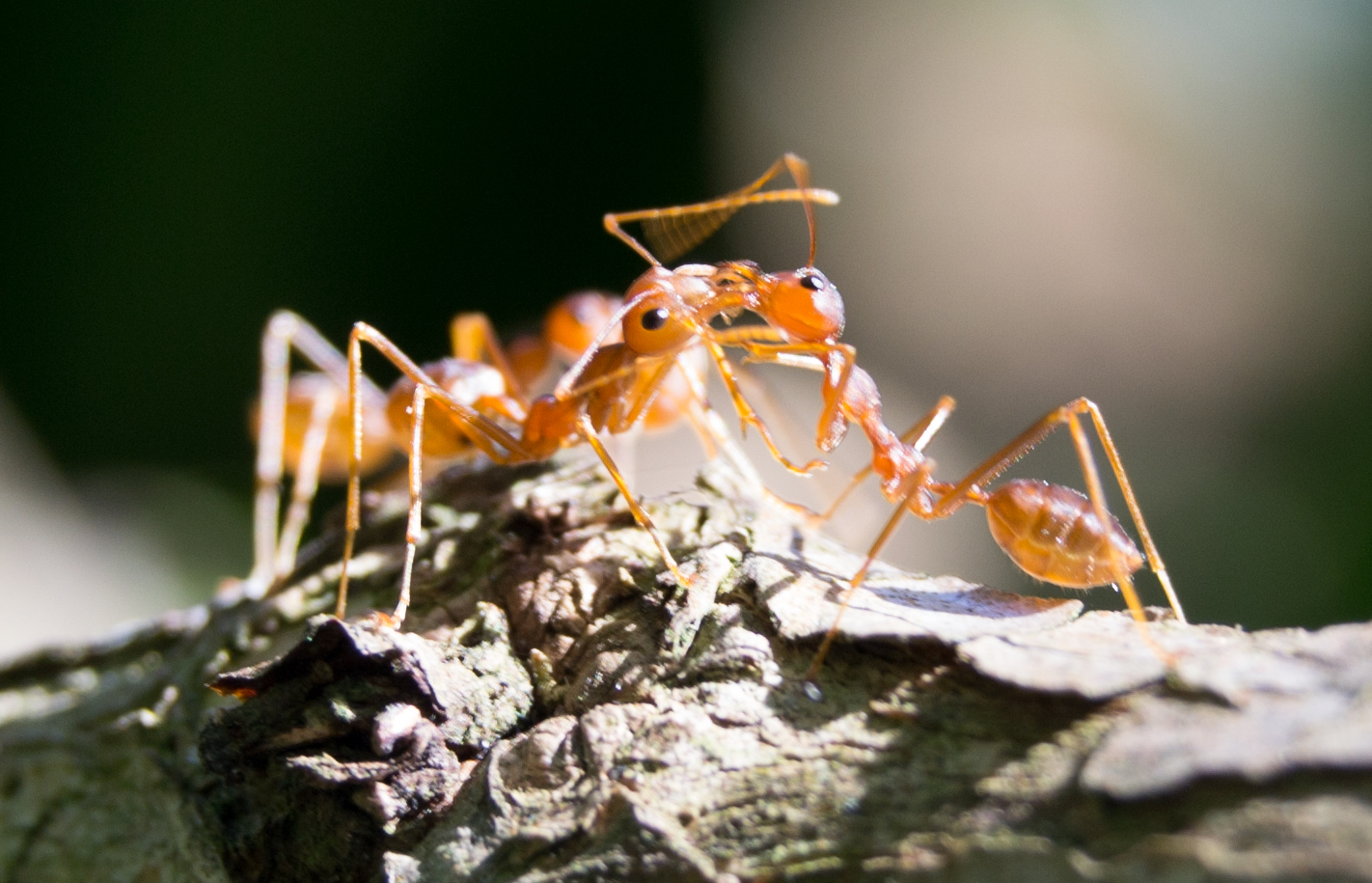
Ants communicating through touch

Ant communication in most species involves pheromones, which is a method using chemical trails for other ants or insects to find and follow.

However, ants of some species can communicate without using pheromones or chemical trails in general. In particular, red wood ants are able to pass information about distant food source using antennal code alone.

== Communication using chemical trails ==
Ants have many different pheromones, depending on the species. When an ant finds something interesting, whether it is food or an enemy, it excretes a chemical substance from it and drags it along the floor to the colony.

When a different worker sets its antenna down on the trail, it senses the trail, changes its own behavior (depending on the specific pheromone) and follows it depending on what kind. If it is a food trail, the worker will follow the trail to find the food; If it does find the food, it will go back to the colony and strengthen the trail, making more and more workers to follow the trail. Same thing with attacking/defending the colony, when detected, other workers will begin attacking the enemy inside a circle of pheromones, rather than a trail.

== Communication without using chemical trails ==
=== Antennal code ===
Ants of some species, such as red wood ants (Formica s.str.), are able to communicate to each other information about distant food sources using antennal code alone, in a manner distantly similar to the dance language of bees. In these species, there exist teams of constant composition. Each team has one leader, called a scout, and about ten followers (foragers). The scout finds the food source and communicates its location to the followers. The team of followers are then able to find the food source without the scout. This fact has been established by experiments using various artificial trees, including the binary tree and others. While the scout had been communicating with its team, the experimenters changed the maze to make sure the team could not use any chemical trails, and subsequently isolated the scout.

The language these ants use is rather sophisticated: the ants adapt their communication, using shorter messages for frequently used locations and compressing some more regular messages. Using a method based on measuring the time it takes the ants to communicate various messages, it has been shown that they can use simple arithmetic operations.

=== Acoustic communication ===
Some ants produce sounds by stridulation, using the gaster segments and their mandibles. Sounds may be used to communicate with colony members or with other species.
