= BMC Zoology =

Academic journal published by BioMed Central

- Discipline: Zoology
- Language: English

Publication details
- Publisher: BioMed Central
- Frequency: Continuous
- Open access: Yes
- License: Creative Commons Licenses
- Impact factor: 1.4 (2023)

Standard abbreviations
- ISO 4: BMC Zool.

Indexing
- ISSN: 2056-3132

Links
- Journal homepage

BMC Zoology is a peer-reviewed open-access scientific journal that covers the field of zoology, focusing on areas such as animal behavior, ecology, and evolutionary biology.

== Abstracting and indexing ==
The journal is abstracted and indexed, for example, in:

- DOAJ
- EBSCO databases
- ProQuest
- Scopus
- Science Citation Index Expanded

According to the Journal Citation Reports, the journal had an impact factor of 1.4 in 2023.
