= The Mind of a Bee =

2022 book by Lars Chittka

- Author: Lars Chittka
- Language: English
- Publisher: Princeton University Press
- Publication date: 19 July 2022 (UK); 26 July 2022 (US)
- ISBN: 978-0-691-18047-2
- OCLC: 1458822721

The Mind of a Bee is a 2022 book by Lars Chittka.

== Content ==
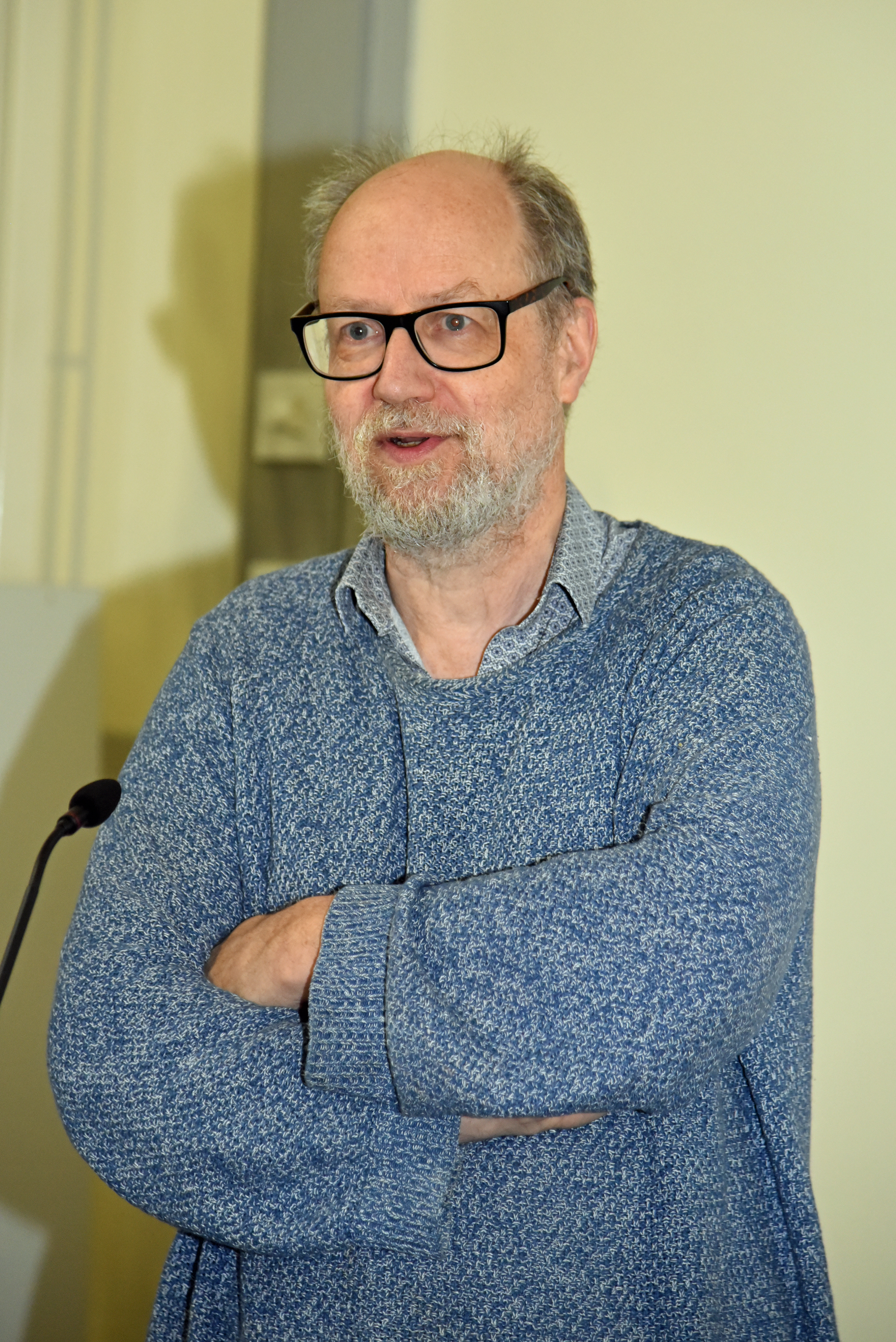
Lars Chittka in February 2025

The book starts with an overarching introduction in which the author gives a basic overview of bees. The following ten chapters deal with bee sensory processing, instinct behaviours, communication, cognition, brain physiology, personality, and consciousness. The final chapter is written as an afterword.

== Reception ==
Alun Anderson reviewed the book for New Scientist.

The book was listed on the 2023 Choice Outstanding Academic Titles.
