= Waxweb =

Waxweb is a hypermedia version of the film Wax or the Discovery of Television Among the Bees by David Blair.

The online version of Waxweb has been hosted since 1994 by the Institute for Advanced Technology in the Humanities at the University of Virginia. It is an 85-minute movie in 80,000 pieces.

In the story at the centre of Waxweb Jacob Maker is a beekeeper who designs flight simulators. The online version enables users to watch the sequences in the order determined by choices made at every step of the way through the story. There is also a CD-ROM version.

The production has received support from the New York State Council for the Arts. Between 1995 and 1997, technical support (and inspiration for this final version) was provided by RACE Laboratory at the University of Tokyo. An early version of Waxweb ran as a MOO, technically supported by Brown University Graphics Lab students (Tom Meyer, Suzanne Hader, David Klaphaak, and others). Additional software for that version was provided by Eastgate Systems with additional assistance from Melynda Barnhardt.

In the movie, Wax or the Discovery of Television Among the Bees, David Blair plays Jacob Maker, Meg Savlov plays Melissa Maker, Florence Ormezzano plays Allelle Zillah, William Burroughs plays James "Hive" Maker, and Dr. Clyde Tombaugh is himself. The movie was created in co-production with Das Kleine Fernsehspiel, a program of ZDF Channel 2 of German Public Television.
