= Animals Up Close =

2023 television series

Animals Up Close With Bertie Gregory is a 2023 television series with 6 episodes produced by National Geographic for streaming on Disney+. It has been renewed for a second season that will be eight episodes.

== Production ==
Along with traditional cameras, Gregory used drones to capture wildlife footage frequently throughout the series. He also used thermal imaging to film animal behaviours at night. Specialized equipment was also used for underwater scenes. Logistical planning for the show took 18 months. The total amount of time spent "in the field" was 219 days. The longest shoot for footage took 51 days, when his team were filming pumas. While there, the series filmed trained dogs protecting sheep from the pumas, which is the first time such behaviour had been filmed. The second longest shoot was in Antarctica, which took 40 days. This is where they filmed orcas hunting seals using waves to throw their prey off the ice. A rare interaction occurred between the two species when a humpback whale tried to disrupt one of these hunts.

== Reception ==
An article for Popular Science noted that the series provides information about animals threatened by climate change. Animals Up Close was nominated for a Daytime Emmy Award.
