= Randolf Menzel =

German neurobiologist and zoologist

Randolf Menzel (born 7 June 1940) is a German neurobiologist and zoologist. He was the director of the Neurobiology Institute at the Freie Universität Berlin (Free University of Berlin) from 1976, primarily researching the brain operations of invertebrates, particularly bees. He has been professor emeritus since 2008.

== Biography ==
He was born to Dr. Helene Menzel (née Urban) and Dr. Hans Menzel in Mariánské Lázně, (known to ethnic Germans as Marienbad in the Reichsgau Sudetenland before their expulsion after World War II). He attended primary school in Goddelau and Gernsheim and secondary school in Gernsheim. He studied biology, chemistry and physics at Johann Wolfgang von Goethe-Universität, Frankfurt am Main (Goethe University, Frankfurt) and Eberhard Karls Universität Tübingen. In 1967, he wrote an award-winning dissertation on colour learning in bees. The following year, he was appointed as a lecturer in the Zoologisches Institut of the Technische Universität Darmstadt (Zoological Institute, Technical University of Darmstadt), where, in 1972, he became an assistant professor and a spokesperson for the group on the Neural Basis of Behaviour. In 1976, he became professor and head of the Institute of Neurobiology at the Freie Universität Berlin; between 1977 and 1988, he was regularly the administrative director of the university's Institute for Animal Physiology and Applied Zoology. Between 1978 and 1980 he was dean of the School of Biology. From 1987 to 1996, he was Curator of the Max Planck Institute for Biological Cybernetics, Tübingen. At the same time he was chair of the review board for the Deutsche Forschungsgemeinschaft (German Research Foundation). Between 1992 and 1995, he was president of the International Society of Neuroethology. From 2002, he was a visiting professor at the Centre of Neuroscience, Norwegian University of Science and Technology. He was spokesperson for the group Plastizität des Nervensystems (Plasticity of the Nervous System) from 1996 to 2006.

The location of flowers is associated with certain scents and colors in the memory of bees. Prior location information is passed on via the 'waggle dance', systematically explained by Austrian Nobel Prize winner Karl von Frisch, the academic supervisor to German behavioural scientist Martin Lindauer, Menzel's own mentor. The focus of much of Menzel's work was neuroscientific research into memory formation and learning in bees, using behavioural analyses in the natural environment and the laboratory. He has used biochemical, electrophysiological and optophysiological methods to research molecular and cellular processes in memory formation. For his PhD thesis, he discovered that honeybees learn to associate a colour with a [sugar] reward after one exposure, both very accurately and faster than any other organism. Later he discovered that honeybees' comparatively much broader sensitivity to odours has a similar speed and accuracy in creating memories, 90% accuracy after a sole exposure to odours typically important to the bees' pollen-and-nectar-gathering activities; in addition he found that this skill was flexible, so bees could be trained to associate non-typical chemicals with rewards. In the 1990s, he supervised and collaborated with Argentinian Martin Giurfa on the cognitive abilities of honeybees concerning pattern recognition. In 2000, he published papers suggesting that honeybees can navigate using a cognitive map.

=== Personal life ===
Menzel married Mechtild M. Kaul in 1967. They have four children.

== Awards ==
- 1961: Hörlein-Preis, Verband Biologie, Biowissenschaften und Biomedizin in Deutschland (Hörlein Prise, German Association of Biology, Biological Science and Biomedicine).
- 1967: Jahrespreis, Johann Wolfgang von Goethe-Universität (annual Johann Wolfgang von Goethe University prize (for dissertation)).
- 1991: Förderpreis für deutsche Wissenschaftler im Gottfried Wilhelm Leibniz-Programm der Deutschen Forschungsgemeinschaft [Award for German Scientists in the Gottfried Wilhelm Leibniz Programme (the 'Leibniz Prize'), German Research Association].
- 2000: Körber Preis für Europäische Wissenschaft [Körber Prize for European Science].
- 2005: Karl Ritter von Frisch Preis der Deutschen Zoologischen Gesellschaft [Karl Ritter vol Frisch Prize, German Zoological].
- 2007: Honorary doctorate, Université Paul Sabatier, Toulouse.
- 2007: Prix international de la Fondation Fyssen, Paris (Fyssen Foundation International Prize (for cognitive neuroscience).

== Research papers and collaborations ==
Menzel is cited as an author on hundreds of research papers. He has mentored or collaborated with many leading representatives in the fields of zoology, neuroscience and philosophy, including Christian Brandes, Lars Chittka, de:Matthias Eckoldt, de:Josef Dudel, de:Julia Fischer, Martin Lindauer, Martin Giurfa, Martin Hammer, Alison Mercer and Robert Franz Schmidt.

=== Publications ===
- Randolf Menzel, Matthias Eckoldt; The Intelligence of Bees. Knaus Verlag, Munich 2016, ISBN 978-3-8135-0665-5.
- Josef Dudel, Randolf Menzel, Robert F. Schmidt; Neuroscience. Springer-Verlag, Berlin 1996, ISBN 3-540-41335-9.
- Randolf Menzel, Alison Mercer (eds.); Neurobiology and Behavior of Honeybees. Springer-Verlag, Berlin 1987, ISBN 3-540-16950-4.
- Randolf Menzel, Julia Fischer (eds.); Animal Thinking: Contemporary Issues in Comparative Cognition. The MIT Press, Cambridge (Mass.) 2024, ISBN 9780262551496
