= (Z)-9-Tricosene =

Insect pheromone

Names
- Preferred IUPAC name (9Z)-Tricos-9-ene
- Other names (Z)-Tricos-9-ene; Muscalure

Identifiers
CAS Number	27519-02-4
3D model (JSmol)	Interactive image
ChemSpider	4517167
ECHA InfoCard	100.044.081
PubChem CID	5365075
UNII	6BSP6HFW73
CompTox Dashboard (EPA)	DTXSID0032653
- InChI: InChI=1S/C23H46/c1-3-5-7-9-11-13-15-17-19-21-23-22-20-18-16-14-12-10-8-6-4-2/h17,19H,3-16,18,20-23H2,1-2H3/b19-17- Key: IGOWHGRNPLFNDJ-ZPHPHTNESA-N; InChI=1/C23H46/c1-3-5-7-9-11-13-15-17-19-21-23-22-20-18-16-14-12-10-8-6-4-2/h17,19H,3-16,18,20-23H2,1-2H3/b19-17- Key: IGOWHGRNPLFNDJ-ZPHPHTNEBA
- SMILES: C(=C\CCCCCCCCCCCCC)\CCCCCCCC

Properties
Chemical formula	C_{23}H_{46}
Molar mass	322.621 g·mol^{−1}
Density	0.806 g/mL
Melting point	−0.6 °C (30.9 °F; 272.5 K)
Boiling point	300 °C (572 °F; 573 K)
- Except where otherwise noted, data are given for materials in their standard state (at 25 °C [77 °F], 100 kPa). Infobox references

(Z)-9-Tricosene, known as muscalure, is an insect pheromone found in dipteran flies such as the housefly. Females produce it to attract males to mate. It is used as a pesticide, as in Maxforce Quickbayt by Bayer, luring males to traps to prevent them from reproducing.

== Biological functions ==
(Z)-9-Tricosene is a sex pheromone produced by female house flies (Musca domestica) to attract males. In bees, it is one of the communication pheromones released during the waggle dance.

== Uses ==
As a pesticide, (Z)-9-tricosene is used in fly paper and other traps to lure male flies, trap them, and prevent them from reproducing.

== Biosynthesis ==
(Z)-9-Tricosene is biosynthesized in house flies from nervonic acid. The acid is converted into the acyl-CoA derivative and then reduced to the aldehyde (Z)-15-tetracosenal. Through a decarboxylation reaction, the aldehyde is converted to (Z)-9-tricosene. The process is mediated by a cytochrome P450 enzyme and requires oxygen (O_{2}) and nicotinamide adenine dinucleotide phosphate (NADPH).

Biosynthesis of (Z)-9-tricosene (bottom) from nervonic acid (top)

== Safety ==
Products containing (Z)-9-tricosene are considered safe for humans, wildlife, and the environment.
