= Timeline of online video =

This is a timeline of online video, meaning streaming media delivered over the Internet.

== Overview ==
Time period	Key developments in online video
1974–1992	Development of practical video coding standards. The development of the discrete cosine transform (DCT) lossy compression method leads to the first practical video formats, H.261 and MPEG, initially used for online video conferencing.
1993–2004	Early days of the World Wide Web. Several container formats for streaming the first videos are released. Some sites, like Newgrounds, heavily rely on these container formats to display online video. Due to quality issues caused by low bandwidth and bad latency, very little streaming video existed on the World Wide Web until 2002 when VHS quality video with reliable lip sync became possible.
2005–2010	Mass-streaming services like YouTube and Netflix become massively popular for streaming online video. Broadband penetration increases, allowing significant fractions of the population to stream online video. Macromedia Flash is the most popular format for displaying online video, as it is used by YouTube and many other sites.
2011–2016	HTML5 starts to displace Flash. Live streaming becomes increasingly popular, especially in the form of services like Twitch. Many social media startups integrate the streaming of short segments of video, like Vine and Keek. These are, in turn, integrated into the most popular services like Instagram and Facebook.

== Full timeline ==
Year	Month and date	Event type	Details
1993	May 22	Technology	Wax or the Discovery of Television Among the Bees, originally released in 1991, is the first film to be streamed on the Internet. Due to bandwidth limitations, it is broadcast at 2 frames per second rather than the standard 24 frames per second. It was watched by a number of people at computer laboratories.
1995	September 5	Technology	ESPN SportsZone streams a live radio broadcast of a baseball game between the Seattle Mariners and the New York Yankees to thousands of its subscribers worldwide using cutting-edge technology, using the RealAudio format, developed by a Seattle-based startup company named RealNetworks – the first livestreaming event.
1995		Technology	Macromedia releases Shockwave Player for Netscape Navigator, which becomes the primary format of streaming media for the late 1990s and 2000s (along with Flash Player, until it is gradually supplanted by HTML5).
1997	September 5	Technology	World Superstars of Wrestling, Inc. partnered with software maker VDO and Webstar (ISP), under Scott Crompton and George Zhen, broadcasting one of the first video based websites. Shot on location in Tampa Bay, Florida, Matsuda and Brody produced six one hour episodes, dubbed the first webisodes with hosts Gordon Solie and Bruno Sammartino. Sir Oliver Humperdink did an interview segment with various wrestling personalities such as Dan "The Beast" Severn, Danny Spivey and others. With the Internet in such an infancy, technology and bandwidth could not support the endeavor so the broadcast only lasted the six episodes. Unofficially, Ring Warriors was the first television show to be broadcast on the Internet.
1997		Companies	ShareYourWorld.com, a predecessor to YouTube, is founded by Chase Norlin, and is subsequently shut down in 2001.
1998		Companies	Marc Collins-Rector and his partner Jim Shackley founded Digital Entertainment Network, which was to deliver original episodic video content over the Internet aimed at niche audiences. The startup collapsed after Collins-Rector’s legal troubles in 2000.
1998	October	Technology	MPEG-4, a method of defining compression of audio and visual (AV) digital data, is introduced.
1999		Technology	Microsoft introduces streaming feature in Windows Media Player 6.4. It introduces the ASF file format, which allows storage of multiple video and audio tracks inside a single file. It also introduces Windows Media streaming protocols that support switching streams during broadcast. This technology is most commonly referred to as Multiple Bit Rate ASF, or simply MBR.
1999	June	Technology	Apple introduces a streaming media format in its QuickTime 4 application.
2000		Product	SpotLife is released for recorded and live video content.
2002	March	Product	Macromedia Flash Player 6 is released with Flash Video support enabling video in web browsers.
2002	October	Technology	Adaptive bit rate over HTTP is created by the DVD Forum at the WG1 Special Streaming group.
2003	May	Technology	The On2 TrueMotion VP6 codec is released.
2003	November	Product	Sprint launched MobiTV live mobile video streaming powered by Idetic Inc. It was renamed SprintTV a year later, increasing the frame rate from 1-2 fps to 15 fps.
2004	June	Products	MindGeek is founded as Too Much Media. Its name is changed to Manwin in 2010, and then MindGeek in October 2013. Its operations are primarily related to Internet pornography, but also include other online properties such as the comedy video website videobash.com and celebrity gossip site celebs.com.
2004	September 9	Products	First cloud-based video editor launched.
2005	January 25	Products	Google Video launches.
2005	February	Products	Stickam, a live video chatting site is launched.
2005	March 15	Companies	Dailymotion, a French video-sharing website, is founded.
2005	April 23	Companies	YouTube opens for video uploads, and the first YouTube video uploaded on April 23, 2005, is titled Me at the zoo. Between March and July 2006, YouTube grows from 30 to 100 million views of videos per day.
2006	May 14	Companies	Crunchyroll, an American website and international online community focused on video streaming East Asian media including anime, manga, drama, music, electronic entertainment, and auto racing content, is founded.
2006	October 1	Companies	Justin.tv, a live-streaming service that is the owner of Twitch, is founded by Justin Kan.
2006	September 7	Products	Amazon introduces video on demand service Amazon Video.
2006	October 9	Mergers	Google acquires YouTube.
2006	October 31	Companies	LiveLeak, a UK-based video sharing website that lets users post and share videos (often of reality footage, politics, war, and other world events), is founded.
2006	December	Companies	Youku, one of China's top online video and streaming service platforms, is founded.
2007	January 15	Products	Netflix announces that it will launch streaming video.
2007	February	Technology	HTML5 specification introduces the video element for the purpose of playing videos. This allows embedding video to no longer necessitate a third-party plugin, as it can be played natively in the browser. HTML5 would later overtake Flash as the primary mechanism for broadcasting video.
2007	May 25	Companies	Pornhub, a pornographic video sharing website, is founded by the web developer Matt Keezer as a website within the company Interhub.
2007	September	Companies	Vevo is founded. It offers music videos from two of the "big three" major record labels, Universal Music Group and Sony Music Entertainment.
2007	September 5	Technology	Microsoft introduces Microsoft Silverlight, an application framework for writing and running rich Internet applications, similar to Adobe Flash.
2008	February 25	Products	DivX announces that it will shut down Stage6, stating that it is unable to continue to provide the attention and resources required for its continued operation.
2008	March 10	Technology	Macromedia Flash moves to the H.264 encoding codec.
2008	March 12	Companies	Hulu, an online streaming service for TV/movies, launches for public access in the United States.
2009	January	Products	Google discontinues the ability to upload videos to Google Video.
2009	November	Technology	Apple first introduces HLS (HTTP Live Streaming), an HTTP-based adaptive bitrate streaming communications protocol.
2010	March	Acquisitions	Pornhub is purchased by Fabian Thylmann as part of the Manwin conglomerate, now known as MindGeek.
2010	April 22	Companies	iQIYI, an online video platform based in Beijing, China launches.
2010	December	Companies	Viki, an international video website offering TV shows, movies, and other premium content, is founded and gets Series A round funding.
2011	January	Technology	Dynamic Adaptive Streaming over HTTP – which enables high quality streaming of media content over the Internet delivered from conventional HTTP web servers – becomes a draft international standard. The MPEG-DASH standard is published as ISO/IEC 23009-1:2012 in April 2012.
2011	April	Companies	Vudu announces the launch of its online streaming service.
2011	May	Acquisitions	Manwin/MindGeek acquires the pornographic video sharing website YouPorn.
2011	June 6	Companies	Justin.tv spins off its gaming division as Twitch, which officially launches in public beta.
2011	July	Companies	Keek – a free online social networking service that allows its users to upload video status updates, which are called "keeks" – launches.
2012	January 19	Companies	Megaupload (and Megavideo) are shut down by the FBI.
2012	June	Companies	Vine, a short-form video sharing service where users can share six-second-long looping video clips, is founded by Dom Hofmann, Rus Yusupov, and Colin Kroll.
2012	December	Companies	Snapchat adds the ability to send video snaps in addition to photos.
2013	June 13	Product	Instagram launches video sharing.
2015	January 27	Products	YouTube drops Flash for HTML5 video as default.
2015	March	Companies	Periscope, a live video streaming app for iOS and Android developed by Kayvon Beykpour and Joe Bernstein is launched (and acquired by Twitter before its launch).
2015	May	Companies	Meerkat, a mobile app that enables users to broadcast live video streaming through their mobile device, releases its app for both iOS and Android.
2016	January	Companies	Facebook launches Facebook Live.
2016	September	Products	TikTok, a short-form video hosting service, is launched.
