= Proboscis extension reflex =

Proboscis extension reflex (PER) is the extension by an insect with an extendable proboscis (e.g. a bee or fly) of her proboscis (sticking out of her tongue) as a reflex to antennal stimulation. It is evoked when a sugar solution is touched to a bee's antenna.

== Use ==
The proboscis extension reflex is part of an insect's feeding behavior. When the taste receptors on the antenna or tarsi are stimulated by sugar water, the proboscis automatically sticks out to drink. This reflex response can be used to study insect learning and memory in the context of foraging. The PER paradigm is most commonly used in associative learning experiments in honeybees and bumblebees because it is easy to use for simple Pavlovian conditioning. It can also be used as a taste behavior assay in fruit flies to measure taste preferences and better understand feeding behaviors.

== How the PER learning paradigm works ==
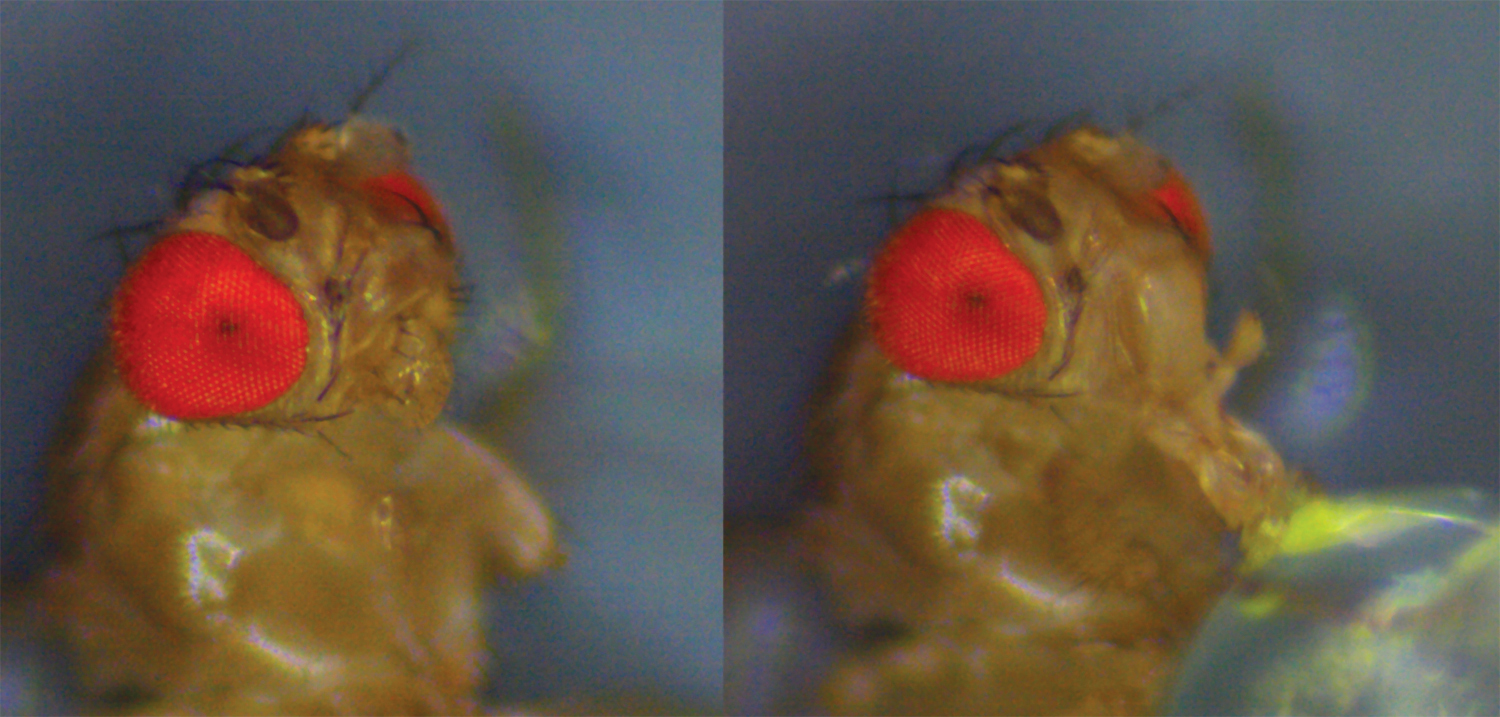
Fruit fly (Drosophila melanogaster) showing proboscis extension reflex to a 5% sucrose solution stimulus

There are two steps in a PER experiment. The first step trains the individual to associate a conditioned stimulus (CS), such as an odor with an unconditioned stimulus (US) such as sugar. For example, the bee is presented with an odor (CS) and an application of the sugar (US) solution to its antennae, upon which she reflexively extends her proboscis. In some variations, the bee is immediately fed with sugar at this point; this constitutes an operant reinforcement which would tend to establish the odor as a discriminative stimulus. After some number of pairings of the CS and US, the second step in the PER paradigm tests whether the association has been learned. The odor (CS) is presented to the bee in the absence of the sugar solution (US), and the association is confirmed if the bee extends her proboscis to this CS alone.

== In honeybees ==
The PER paradigm has been successfully used to investigate olfactory learning in honeybees. It was first introduced by Kimihisa Takeda in 1961. Experiments by Bitterman used first-order classical conditioning to associate an odor with a sugar reward. Individual bees were placed in a tube with their head sticking out. Then a stream of odorant blown towards the bee's head was immediately followed by touching the antenna with a sugar droplet. After only three such trials, the odor alone caused the bee to extend its proboscis approximately 90% of the time. Bees also showed second-order conditioning, learning to associate a second odor with the original odor. The PER paradigm has also been used in honeybees to study motion learning, thermal learning, color learning, habituation, and reversal learning. Abramson et al 2004 use this technique to investigate their sensation of and response to tebufenozide and diflubenzuron.

== In bumblebees ==
Although the majority of PER studies are performed on honeybees, there is at least one successful study of using PER on bumblebees. After they were exposed to a conditioning procedure like that used with honeybees (see above) they gave a conditioned PER response to odor alone 85% of the time after 10 trials.

== Learning laterality ==
Recently, interesting findings in PER studies show laterality in olfactory learning in the two antennae i.e., one antenna is better at associative learning than the other antenna. In honeybees, individuals had either their right or their left antenna covered with a silicone sleeve, leaving the other antenna exposed. The bees that had their right antenna exposed were better at associating an odor with a food reward than bees that had their left antenna exposed. The same study also found that the right antenna has more olfactory receptors than the left antenna, a possible cause for this lateralized PER learning. However, other causes such as internal differences in the actual olfactory pathway or the central nervous system must not be ruled out just yet.

== See also ==
- Bee learning and communication
- Animal behavior
