= Second-order conditioning =

Form of learning

An example of second-order conditioning

In classical conditioning, second-order conditioning or higher-order conditioning is a form of learning in which the first stimulus is classically conditioned to an unconditioned stimulus, then a second stimulus is classically conditioned to the first, thereby conditioning it back to the original unconditioned stimulus. For example, an animal might first learn to associate a bell with food (first-order conditioning), but then learn to associate a light with the bell (second-order conditioning), associating the light to food (unconditioned stimulus). Honeybees show second-order conditioning during proboscis extension reflex conditioning.

Second-order conditioning (SOC) occurs in three phases. In the first training phase, a conditioned stimulus, (CS1) is followed by an unconditioned stimulus (US). In the second phase, a second-order conditioned stimulus (CS2) is presented along with CS1. Finally, in the test phase, CS2 is presented alone to the subjects while their responses are recorded.

Evidence suggests that a second-order conditioned stimulus is able to persist for weeks, and that a third or higher order may be possible. The first-order conditioned stimulus can stabilize and serve as the foundation for multiple conditioned stimuli "superimposed upon it" as opposed to just one.

== Models of second-order conditioning ==
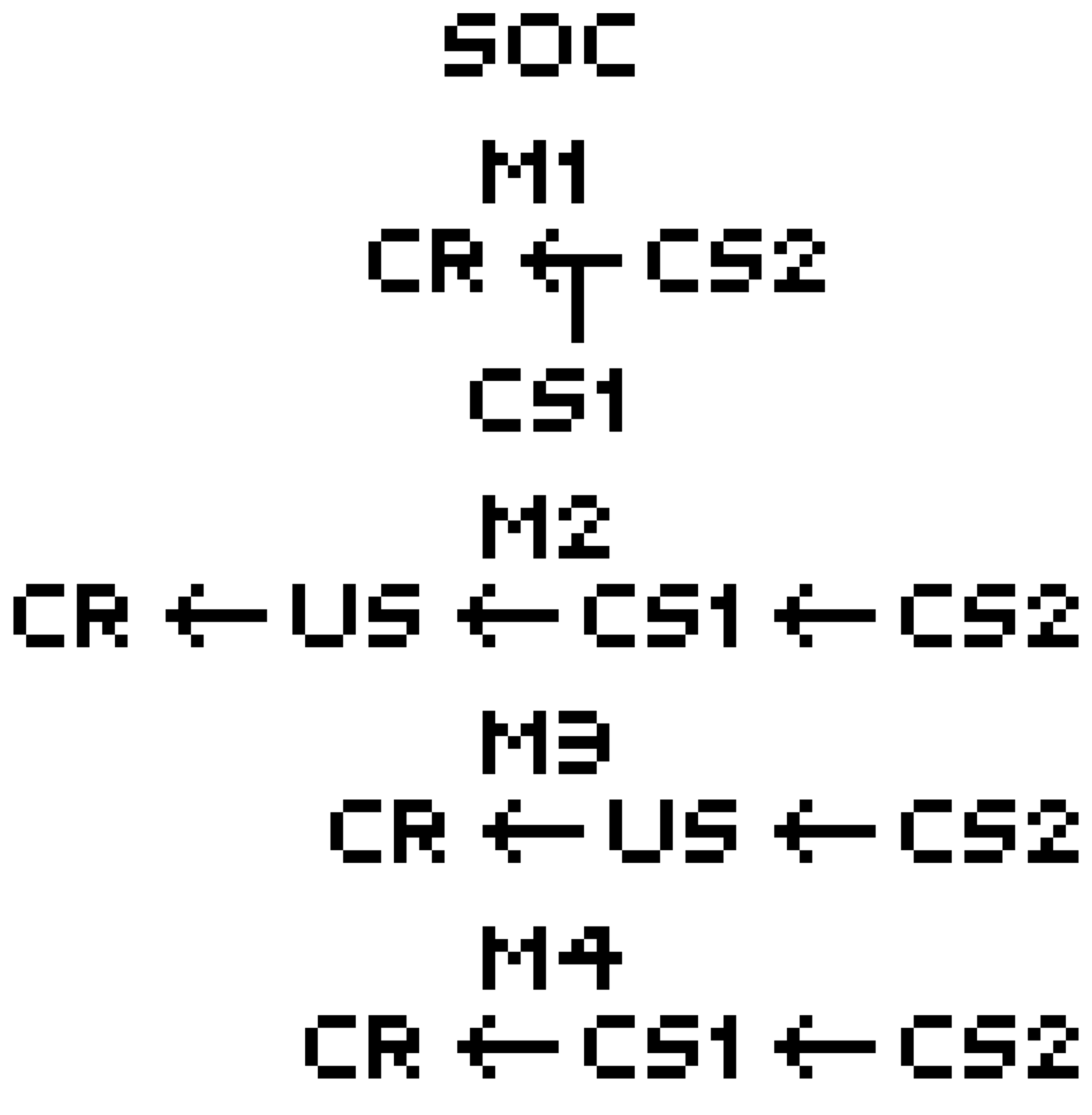
M1 - M4 represent the 4 models of second-order conditioning (SOC).

Theoretical models for how second-order conditioning (SOC) works have a basis in associative learning theories. There are four broad models based on the associations formed during SOC. The first model suggests that the second-order stimulus (CS2) and the conditioned response (CR) form a direct link which is strengthened by the presence of the first-order stimulus (CS1). The second model suggests that in successful SOC an associative representation of each stimulus is created. The presentation of the CS2 would evoke a representation of the CS1, which would evoke a representation of the unconditioned stimulus (US), thus leading to the CR. The third model suggests a direct link between the CS2 and a representation of the US which leads to the CR. The fourth model suggests that the CS2 elicits a CR through a CS1 representation because a connection exists between the CS2 and the CS1 representation. Second-order conditioning helps explain why some people desire money to the point that they hoard it and value it even more than the objects it purchases. Money is initially used to purchase objects that produce gratifying outcomes, such as an expensive car. Although money is not directly associated with the thrill of a drive in a new sports car, through second-order conditioning, money can become linked with this type of desirable quality. Money (CS2) becomes directly associated with a conditioned response because of its link to physical assets (CS1) that lead to a satisfying unconditioned stimulus.

== In fear conditioning ==
It has been demonstrated in an associative fear conditioning chain, such as CS_{2} → CS_{1} → US, that extinction of freezing responses to the first-order stimulus (CS_{1}) leads to responding impairments in CS_{2}, but extinction of the second-order stimulus (CS_{2}), does not have any effect on CS_{1} (Debiec et al.). In the same study, the effect of activation (memory retrieval) on such an associative chain has been examined. Results demonstrated that protein synthesis inhibition after exposure to a single CS_{1} impairs responses to both CS_{1} and CS_{2}, but protein synthesis inhibition after exposure to a single CS_{2}, only disrupts CS_{2} and leaves CS_{1} freezing intact. Therefore, it is believed that when the first-order association is directly activated, it is placed into a labile state (as we would expect from memory reconsolidation research) which may affect dependent associations. However, when the first-order association is only indirectly activated (through the associative chain), it appears that there is not sufficient stimulation to kick off cellular processes which would place it in a labile state, so it remains fixed.
