= Grooming dance =

Dance performed by honeybees

A grooming dance, grooming invitation dance or shaking dance is a dance performed by honeybees to initiate allogrooming. It was first reported in 1945 by biologist Mykola H. Hadak. An increase in the frequency of the grooming dance has been observed among the bees of mite-infested colonies, and among bees who have been dusted with small particles of chalk dust.

== See also ==
- Bee learning and communication
- Tremble dance
- Waggle dance
