= Animal behaviour =

Animal behaviour is the individual or social behaviour of animals, contributing to their survival. It is studied by the science of ethology.

== Determinants of behaviour ==
Behaviour is determined by three major factors, namely inborn instincts, learning, and environmental factors. The latter include abiotic and biotic factors. Abiotic factors such as temperature or light conditions have dramatic effects on animals, especially if they are ectothermic or nocturnal. Biotic factors include members of the same species (e.g. sexual behaviour), predators (fight or flight), or parasites and diseases.

=== Instinct ===
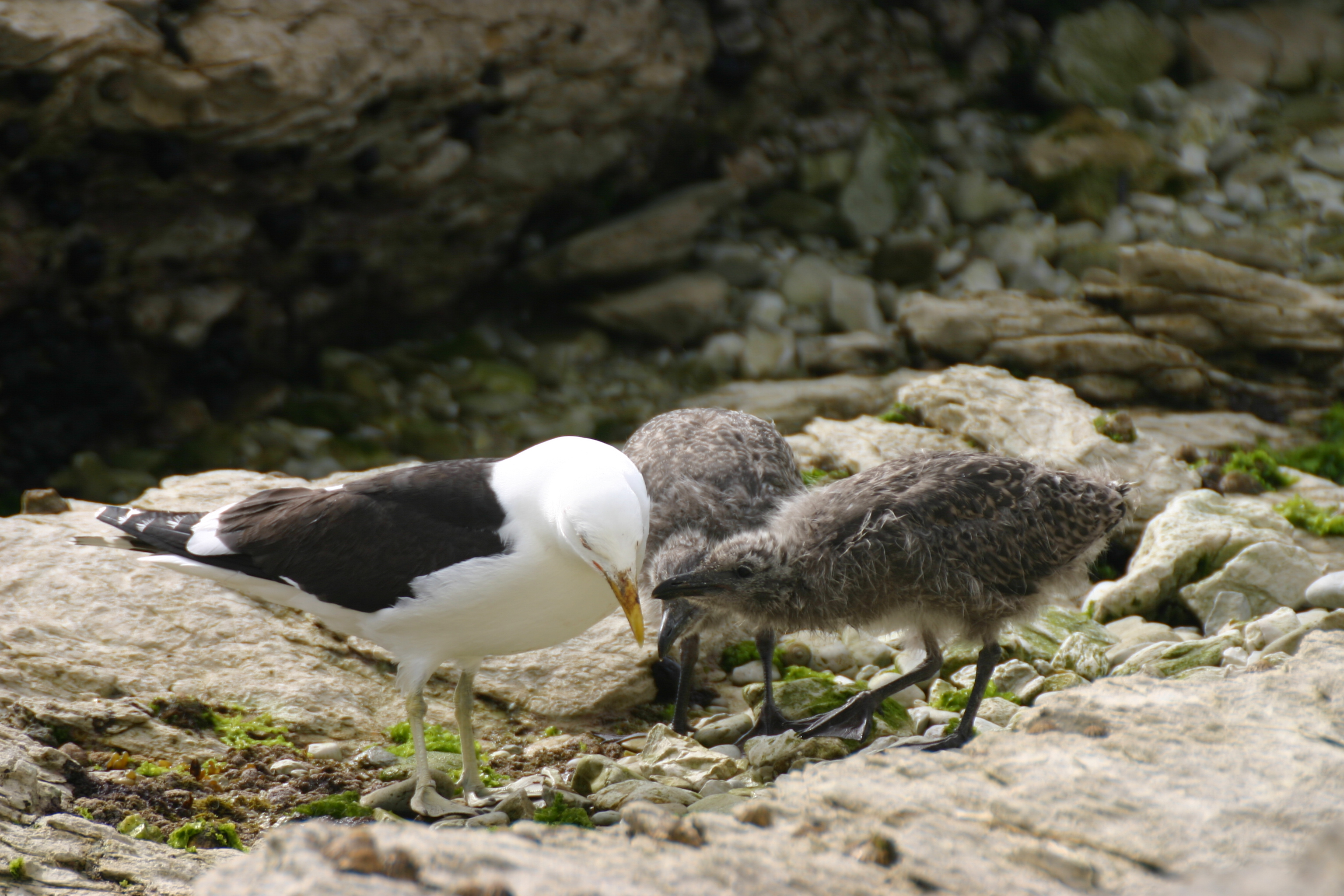
Kelp gull chicks peck at red spot on mother's beak to stimulate regurgitating reflex

Webster's Dictionary defines instinct as "A largely inheritable and unalterable tendency of an organism to make a complex and specific response to environmental stimuli without involving reason". This covers fixed action patterns like beak movements of bird chicks, and the waggle dance of honeybees.

==== Fixed action patterns ====
An important development, associated with the name of Konrad Lorenz though probably due more to his teacher, Oskar Heinroth, was the identification of fixed action patterns. Lorenz popularized these as instinctive responses that would occur reliably in the presence of identifiable stimuli called sign stimuli or "releasing stimuli". Fixed action patterns are now considered to be instinctive behavioural sequences that are relatively invariant within the species and that almost inevitably run to completion.

A releaser is the stimulus that sets off a fixed action pattern. A well-studied example is the beak movements of many bird species performed by newly hatched chicks, which stimulates the mother to regurgitate food for her offspring. Other examples are the classic studies by Tinbergen on the egg-retrieval behaviour and the effects of a "supernormal stimulus" on the behaviour of greylag geese.

One investigation of this kind was the study of the waggle dance ("dance language") in bee communication by Karl von Frisch.

=== Learning ===
==== Habituation ====
Habituation is a simple form of learning and occurs in many animal taxa. It is the process whereby an animal ceases responding to a stimulus. Often, the response is an innate behaviour. Essentially, the animal learns not to respond to irrelevant stimuli. For example, prairie dogs (Cynomys ludovicianus) give alarm calls when predators approach, causing all individuals in the group to quickly scramble down burrows. When prairie dog towns are located near trails used by humans, giving alarm calls every time a person walks by is expensive in terms of time and energy. Habituation to humans is therefore an important behaviour in this context.

==== Associative learning ====
Associative learning in animal behaviour is any learning process in which a new response becomes associated with a particular stimulus. The first studies of associative learning were made by the Russian physiologist Ivan Pavlov, who observed that dogs trained to associate food with the ringing of a bell would salivate on hearing the bell.

==== Imprinting ====
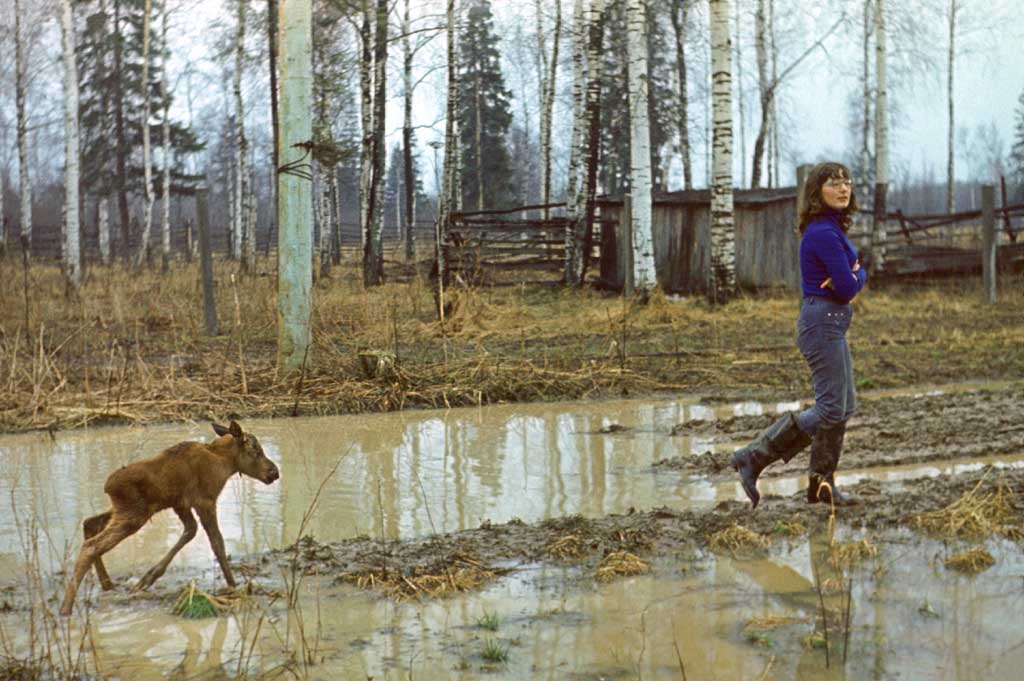
Imprinting in a moose.

Imprinting enables the young to discriminate the members of their own species, vital for reproductive success. This important type of learning only takes place in a very limited period of time. Konrad Lorenz observed that the young of birds such as geese and chickens followed their mothers spontaneously from almost the first day after they were hatched, and he discovered that this response could be imitated by an arbitrary stimulus if the eggs were incubated artificially and the stimulus were presented during a critical period that continued for a few days after hatching.

==== Cultural learning ====
===== Imitation =====
Imitation is an advanced behaviour whereby an animal observes and exactly replicates the behaviour of another. The National Institutes of Health reported that capuchin monkeys preferred the company of researchers who imitated them to that of researchers who did not. The monkeys not only spent more time with their imitators but also preferred to engage in a simple task with them even when provided with the option of performing the same task with a non-imitator. Imitation has been observed in recent research on chimpanzees; not only did these chimps copy the actions of another individual, when given a choice, the chimps preferred to imitate the actions of the higher-ranking elder chimpanzee as opposed to the lower-ranking young chimpanzee.

===== Stimulus and local enhancement =====
Animals can learn using observational learning but without the process of imitation. One way is stimulus enhancement in which individuals become interested in an object as the result of observing others interacting with the object. Increased interest in an object can result in object manipulation which allows for new object-related behaviours by trial-and-error learning. Haggerty (1909) devised an experiment in which a monkey climbed up the side of a cage, placed its arm into a wooden chute, and pulled a rope in the chute to release food. Another monkey was provided an opportunity to obtain the food after watching a monkey go through this process on four occasions. The monkey performed a different method and finally succeeded after trial-and-error. In local enhancement, a demonstrator attracts an observer's attention to a particular location. Local enhancement has been observed to transmit foraging information among birds, rats and pigs. The stingless bee (Trigona corvina) uses local enhancement to locate other members of their colony and food resources.

===== Social transmission =====
A well-documented example of social transmission of a behaviour occurred in a group of macaques on Hachijojima Island, Japan. The macaques lived in the inland forest until the 1960s, when a group of researchers started giving them potatoes on the beach: soon, they started venturing onto the beach, picking the potatoes from the sand, and cleaning and eating them. About one year later, an individual was observed bringing a potato to the sea, putting it into the water with one hand, and cleaning it with the other. This behaviour was soon expressed by the individuals living in contact with her; when they gave birth, this behaviour was also expressed by their young—a form of social transmission.

==== Teaching ====
Teaching is a highly specialized aspect of learning in which the "teacher" (demonstrator) adjusts their behaviour to increase the probability of the "pupil" (observer) achieving the desired end-result of the behaviour. For example, orcas are known to intentionally beach themselves to catch pinniped prey. Mother orcas teach their young to catch pinnipeds by pushing them onto the shore and encouraging them to attack the prey. Because the mother orca is altering her behaviour to help her offspring learn to catch prey, this is evidence of teaching. Teaching is not limited to mammals. Many insects, for example, have been observed demonstrating various forms of teaching to obtain food. Ants, for example, will guide each other to food sources through a process called "tandem running," in which an ant will guide a companion ant to a source of food. It has been suggested that the pupil ant is able to learn this route to obtain food in the future or teach the route to other ants. This behaviour of teaching is also exemplified by crows, specifically New Caledonian crows. The adults (whether individual or in families) teach their young adolescent offspring how to construct and utilize tools. For example, Pandanus branches are used to extract insects and other larvae from holes within trees.

== Mating and the fight for supremacy ==
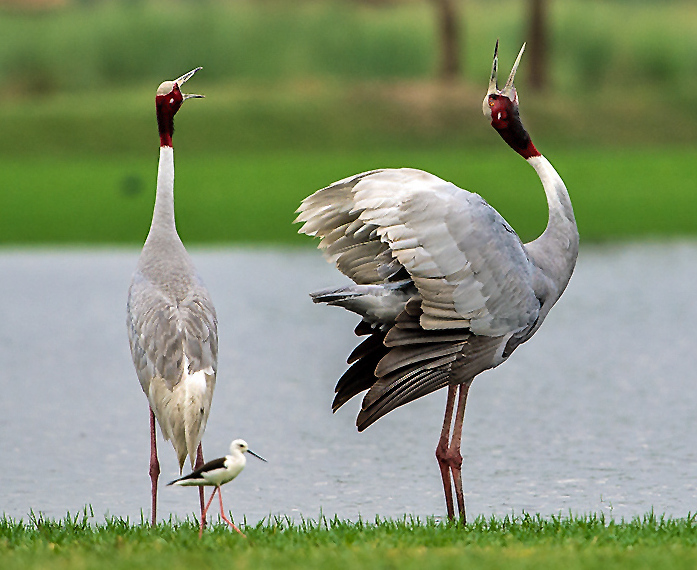
Courtship display of a sarus crane

Individual reproduction is the most important phase in the proliferation of individuals or genes within a species: for this reason, there exist complex mating rituals, which can be very complex even if they are often regarded as fixed action patterns. The stickleback's complex mating ritual, studied by Tinbergen, is regarded as a notable example.

Often in social life, animals fight for the right to reproduce, as well as social supremacy. A common example of fighting for social and sexual supremacy is the so-called pecking order among poultry. Every time a group of poultry cohabitate for a certain time length, they establish a pecking order. In these groups, one chicken dominates the others and can peck without being pecked. A second chicken can peck all the others except the first, and so on. Chickens higher in the pecking order may at times be distinguished by their healthier appearance when compared to lower level chickens. While the pecking order is establishing, frequent and violent fights can happen, but once established, it is broken only when other individuals enter the group, in which case the pecking order re-establishes from scratch.

== Social behaviour ==
Several animal species, including humans, tend to live in groups. Group size is a major aspect of their social environment. Social life is probably a complex and effective survival strategy. It may be regarded as a sort of symbiosis among individuals of the same species: a society is composed of a group of individuals belonging to the same species living within well-defined rules on food management, role assignments and reciprocal dependence.

When biologists interested in evolution theory first started examining social behaviour, some apparently unanswerable questions arose, such as how the birth of sterile castes, like in bees, could be explained through an evolving mechanism that emphasizes the reproductive success of as many individuals as possible, or why, amongst animals living in small groups like squirrels, an individual would risk its own life to save the rest of the group. These behaviours may be examples of altruism. Not all behaviours are altruistic, as indicated by the table below. For example, revengeful behaviour was at one point claimed to have been observed exclusively in Homo sapiens. However, other species have been reported to be vengeful including chimpanzees and camels.

Classification of social behaviours
Type of behaviour	Effect on the donor	Effect on the receiver
Egoistic	Neutral to Increases fitness	Decreases fitness
Cooperative	Neutral to Increases fitness	Neutral to Increases fitness
Altruistic	Decreases fitness	Neutral to Increases fitness
Revengeful	Decreases fitness	Decreases fitness

Altruistic behaviour has been explained by the gene-centred view of evolution.

=== Benefits and costs of group living ===
One advantage of group living is decreased predation. If the number of predator attacks stays the same despite increasing prey group size, each prey has a reduced risk of predator attacks through the dilution effect. Further, according to the selfish herd theory, the fitness benefits associated with group living vary depending on the location of an individual within the group. The theory suggests that conspecifics positioned at the centre of a group will reduce the likelihood predations while those at the periphery will become more vulnerable to attack. In groups, prey can also actively reduce their predation risk through more effective defence tactics, or through earlier detection of predators through increased vigilance.

Another advantage of group living is an increased ability to forage for food. Group members may exchange information about food sources, facilitating the process of resource location. Honeybees are a notable example of this, using the waggle dance to communicate the location of flowers to the rest of their hive. Predators also receive benefits from hunting in groups, through using better strategies and being able to take down larger prey.

Some disadvantages accompany living in groups. Living in close proximity to other animals can facilitate the transmission of parasites and disease, and groups that are too large may also experience greater competition for resources and mates.

=== Group size ===
Theoretically, social animals should have optimal group sizes that maximize the benefits and minimize the costs of group living. However, in nature, most groups are stable at slightly larger than optimal sizes. Because it generally benefits an individual to join an optimally-sized group, despite slightly decreasing the advantage for all members, groups may continue to increase in size until it is more advantageous to remain alone than to join an overly full group.
