= Round dance (honey bee) =

Honeybee behavior

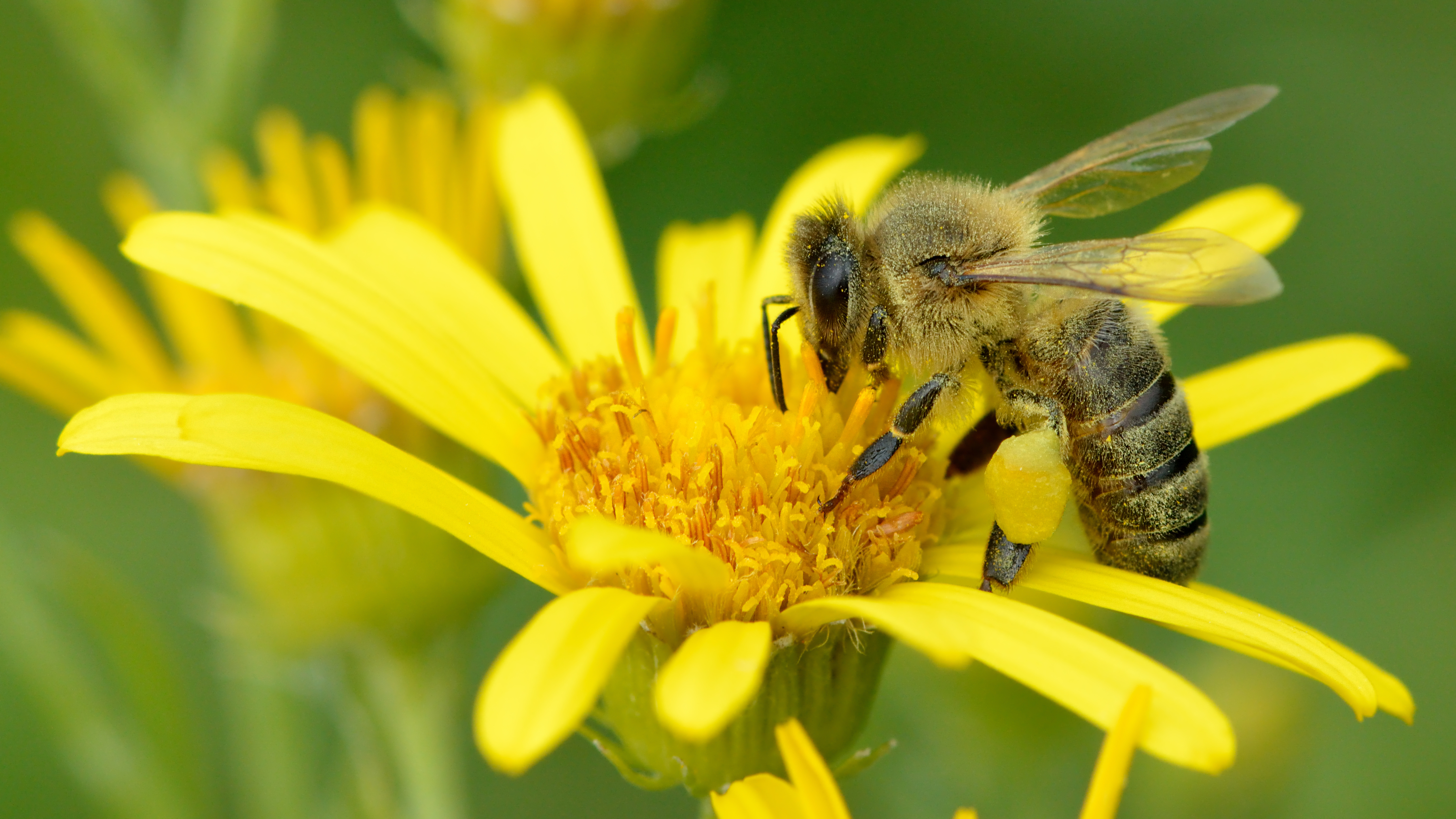
Honey bee (Apis mellifera)

A round dance is the communicative behaviour of a foraging honey bee (Apis mellifera), in which it moves on the comb in close circles, alternating right and then left. It was previously believed that the round dance indicates that the forager has located a profitable food source close to the hive and the round dance transitions into the waggle dance when food sources are more than 50 meters (160 ft) away. Recent research shows that bees have only one dance that always encodes distance and direction to the food source, but that precision and expression of this information depends on the distance to the target; therefore, the use of "round dance" is outdated. Elements of the round dance also provide information regarding the forager's subjective evaluation of the food source's profitability.

Nobel laureate Karl von Frisch was one of the first ethologists to investigate both the waggle dance and round dance through his studies examining honey bee foraging behaviours, and is credited with translating many of their underlying mechanisms.

== Description ==
If a foraging honey bee (Apis mellifera) locates a profitable food source, it returns to the hive and performs a round dance to communicate its location. The forager bee moves in close circles over the comb, alternating directions. The round dance is performed by the forager bee when the food source is located in the immediate vicinity of the hive. Karl von Frisch determined that the critical distance for switching between the round dance and the waggle dance exists at 50 meters (160 ft) away from the hive. The scent attached to the forager bee's body communicates the type of food source in question to the follower bees. However, the scent of the food source alone is not sufficient information to guide the follower bees to said food source.

== Mechanism ==
It has been shown that many of the mechanisms used to communicate distance and direction in the waggle dance are also employed in the round dance. The following section will focus on the role of each mechanism as a function of the round dance, specifically.

=== Acoustic signals ===
Acoustic signals are produced as a part of the round dance. These acoustic signals communicate information regarding direction, and give an indication of the distance to the food source. The dance sounds produced by the round dance are airborne, and are of sufficient strength to stimulate Johnston's organs in the antenna of the follower bees to which the forager is communicating. The follower bees extract information about the direction of the food source from the acoustic field that the forager produces. Direction to the food source is communicated through the sound information emitted by the forager bee, as well as through the air currents that accompany the dance sound, The duration and frequency of the sound produced, along with the magnitude of the pressure gradient produced provide the follower bees with information regarding the direction to the food source. Acoustic signals are also used to communicate distance. The duration of the acoustic signal transmitted is proportional to the distance to the food source. In that, the train of sound pulses produced by the forager bee, known as the dance sound, increases relative to the distance to the food source.

=== Position of the sun ===
The round dance uses the position of the sun to indicate the direction from the hive to the food source in the same way that the waggle dance does.

The round dance uses the position of the sun in order to indicate the direction of the food source in the same way that the waggle dance does. On the vertical surface of the comb, the forager expresses the angle between the position of the sun and the path to the food source through an angular deflection from perfect vertical. Honey bees use both the position of the sun and the polarization patterns of a blue sky to communicate the direction to the food source. Support for this theory rests in the observation that honey bees can still recognize the sun's position when it is obscured by a cloud or a mountain, for example. Honey bees also recognize the daily movements of the sun and can use the sun as a compass by calculating the hour of the day.

== Communicating profitability ==
The round dance communicates the subjective evaluation of a food resource's profitability made by the forager. In regards to nectar, a common food source for honey bees, profitability is determined by its energetic value. Karl von Frisch originally suggested a relationship between what he termed the "liveliness" of the round dance and the value of the food source. Since then, the liveliness of the round dance has been dissected into quantifiable parts. Honey bees communicate information regarding the profitability of a food source through: rate of reversals, number of reversals, and dance duration. Research indicates that the rate of reversals in the round dance is the measure of profitability that is most highly correlated to food source quality. The energetic value of the food source is also correlated with several aspects of the dance sound. There is a positive correlation between energetic value and mean carrier frequency, pulse repetition rate, amplitude, and duration of the sound bursts.

However, costs can be associated with the food sources, and consequently lower their subjective profitability. Some possible costs include: distance from the hive, and nectar flow rate. Furthermore, the forager's subjective rating of the profitability of a food source depends on the quality of food sources that the forager had previously encountered. If the forager had previously encountered a food source of higher energetic value, and less cost, it will rate the current food source as less profitable than if it had previously encountered a food source of less energetic value. Thus, the forager bee integrates the costs and benefits associated with each potential food source and communicates their subjective profitability through their round dance performance. However, the forager bee only communicates the food source if it passes a certain concentration threshold for dancing, by passing this threshold it is determined that there are enough benefits associated with the food source to justify expending the energy required for performing the round dance.

=== Response to communicated profitability ===
Although the round dance communicates the different profitabilities associated with each food source, the round dances displaying both rich and poor food resources are equally stimulating to the follower bees. The follower bees do not respond to only the most rich food resources because the benefits of being highly selective about which dance to respond to are low. It is suggested that honey bees benefit more from responding to a wide array of food sources rather than all congregating at the same, slightly richer food source. Also, since all food resources have to pass the concentration threshold for dancing in order to be communicated via the round dance, any food resource that is communicated through the round dance must have a relatively high profitability.
