= Wax or the Discovery of Television Among the Bees =

- Directed by: David Blair
- Written by: David Blair
- Produced by: David Blair
- Starring: David Blair; William S. Burroughs; Florence Ormezzano; Meg Savlov; Clyde Tombaugh
- Cinematography: Mark Kaplan; 3D Animation by Florence Ormezzano
- Music by: Beo Morales and Brooks Williams
- Release date: 1991
- Running time: 85 minutes
- Country: United States
- Language: English

Wax or the Discovery of Television Among the Bees is the first independent feature film by American filmmaker and artist David Blair. It was also the first film to be livestreamed on the Internet.

== Synopsis ==
Blair performs in the film, which additionally features a cameo by William Burroughs. As an anti-war statement, Wax provided an early critique of the Gulf War. It is a combination of digital animation, found footage, and live action.

Set in New Mexico around 1983, gun designer Jacob Maker inherited "Mesopotamian" bees from his grandfather.

== Production ==
Wax or the Discovery of Television Among the Bees and Waxweb have been supported by substantial grants, co-production, and international sales. Grants for this project include three awards from the New York State Council for the Arts, National Endowment for the Arts, New York Foundation for the Arts, American Film Institute, Jerome Foundation, and Checkerboard Foundation. The film took a total of six years to produce. According to Blair, "it started as a three-and-a-half minute piece [...] then I added a story to it".

== Reception ==
Released in 1991, Wax was a cult hit, playing cinemas in 26 U.S. cities and had additional theatrical play in Japan and Australia. Wax was a co-production with ZDF, German Television, and opened theatrically to rave reviews at the Public Theater in New York. Wax was included in a number of 10 Best Film lists that year.

== Legacy ==
As the first film streamed across the Internet in 1993 (at 2 frames per second), the New York Times declaring Wax or the Discovery of Television Among the Bees a “historic event.” That same year, the hypermedia version of the film, Waxweb, was one of the first sites on the World Wide Web, and thus has been repeatedly cited as a milestone of Internet Art. Waxweb has been presented in museums worldwide. Wax or the Discovery of Television Among the Bees was an early example of digital cinema, was one of the first independent films to be edited on a digital non-linear system, the Montage Picture Processor, and transferred from video to 16mm film for theatrical presentation.

== See also ==
- Internet art
- History of the Internet
