= Lucy Pullen =

Canadian artist based in New York

Lucy Pullen (born 1971) is a Canadian artist based in New York. She is best known for crossover projects, sculpture and drawing.

== Early life and education ==
Pullen was born to Gillian Lovitt (née Wickwire) and Hugh Francis Haswell Pullen in Montreal, Quebec and raised in Halifax, Nova Scotia. In 1994, she received a bachelor's degree in studio art from the Nova Scotia College of Art and Design in Halifax. In 2001, she received a Master of Fine Art from Tyler School of Art, Temple University, in Philadelphia.

From 2002 to 2013, Pullen was an assistant professor of visual art at the University of Victoria in British Columbia Canada, tenured in 2007.

== Work ==
In 2018, Pullen participated in the CAFKA (Contemporary Art Forum Kitchener and Area), a biannual, free public exhibition of contemporary art in the cities and surrounding areas of Kitchener, Waterloo and Cambridge. For CAFKA.18, Pullen produced a mural, titled Recognize Everyone, that covers the elevator shaft and the wraparound fire escape on the building of 27 Gaukel Street in Kitchener. The polychromatic star mural work is an immersive art work, that visitors can walk into as they climb the stairs of the building.

In her series Interval for Halifax (2013), Pullen wrapped playground swings in Scotchlite tape. Visitors interact with the work by playing on the swings. The artist suggests photographing the swings in action, using flash, in order to experience the work fully. "The swing is [wrapped] in reflective material, in a certain moment it looks like a line of light, as if someone is riding a bolt of lightning."

== Style ==
Her work has a playfulness and directness that opens it up to the viewer. It can be critically linked to conceptualism, and to a NSCAD trend to use unusual materials to make metaphysical points, but it is not necessary to know a secret art language to understand or enjoy it. Her work is marked by conceptual ambition, technical daring, and antic humor. Pullen's work is built on paradox. While her work varies dramatically in its final form, an analytical orientation can be isolated as a unifying thread throughout her recent work. Product and invention never seem to be the point. Discovery, arising from the process of creation and destruction, does. Preoccupied with changing the points of reference that box art in as art, she calls attention to the artistic potential within everyday experience.
