= Tremble dance =

Honey bee behavior

A tremble dance is a dance performed by forager honey bees of the species Apis mellifera to recruit more receiver honey bees to collect the nectar that the workers have brought back to the hive. When a bee performs the dance, she shakes her body, spins, and walks, all at the same time. This can sometimes last half an hour.

== History of discovery ==
The tremble dance was first described by Karl von Frisch in the 1920s (who was also first to describe the waggle dance), but no light was shed on its function until 1993 when Wolfgang Kirschner discovered that, when performed, the dance stopped nearby workers from flying to gather more nectar.

== Function ==
The tremble dance of the honeybee is used by a forager when it perceives a long delay in unloading its nectar or a shortage of receiver bees, indicating a need to switch worker allocation from foragers to receivers. It may also spread the scent released during the forager's waggle dance. The waggle and tremble dances are likely the two "primary regulation mechanisms" for controlling group behavior in the bee colony, and one of four or five observed mechanisms known to be used by honeybees to change the task allocation among worker bees.

== Linkage to ethanol consumption ==
The consumption of ethanol by foraging bees has been shown to increase the occurrence of the tremble dance while decreasing the occurrence of the waggle dance.

== See also ==
- Bee learning and communication
- Bee piping
- Eusociality
- Grooming dance
- Waggle dance

== Sources and further reading ==
- Arnold et al. (September 2002) Intra-Colonial Variability in the Dance Communication in Honeybees (Apis mellifera). Ethology Vol. 108, Issue 9. pp. 751–761.
- Biesmeijer, J. C. (May 2003) The occurrence and context of tremble dancing in free-foraging honey bees (Apis mellifera). Behavioral Ecology and Sociobiology. Volume 53, Number 6. pp. 411–416.
- Dyer, Fred C. (January 2002) The biology of the dance language. Annual Review of Entomology. Vol. 47. pp. 917–949.
- Schneider, Stanley S.; Lee A. Lewis. (2003) Honey bee communication: the "tremble dance", the vibration signal and the "migration dance", in: Webster T. (Ed.) Monographs in honey bee biology. Northern Bee Books, West Yorks, Great Britain. Vol. 1, pp. 1–26.
- Schneider, Stanley S.; Lee A. Lewis. (March 2004) The vibration signal, modulatory communication and the organization of labor in honey bees, Apis mellifera. Apidologie. Vol. 35, Issue 2. pp. 117–131.
- Seeley, Thomas D. (July 1997) Honey Bee Colonies are Group-Level Adaptive Units. The American Naturalist. Vol. 150, Supplement: Multilevel Selection. pp. S22-S41.
- Seeley, Thomas D. (June 1999) Born to Dance. Natural History. Vol. 108, Number 6. pp. 54–57.
- Takeshi, Otani. (2001) Dance performance at very near distance from the honeybee hive. Honeybee Science. Vol. 22, Number 3. pp. 127–138.
- Thom, Corinna. (2002) Dynamics and Communication Structures of Nectar Foraging in Honey bees (Apis mellifera). Dissertation zur Erlangung des naturwissenschaftlichen Doktorgrades der Bayerischen Julius-Maximilians -Universität Würzburg.
