= David Blair (filmmaker) =

American video artist

David Blair is a motion picture artist, known for his work in video art.

== Career ==
His first feature, the 1991 cult hit Wax or the Discovery of Television Among the Bees, was funded with public arts grants, and a co-production with ZDF, German Television. After the European broadcast, a 16mm print opened theatrically to excellent reviews at the Public Theater in New York. The copies of that print played in cinemas in 26 U.S. cities, further copying themselves for later theatrical play in Japan and Australia. Blair performs in the film. On May 23, 1993, a VHS copy of Wax or the Discovery of Television Among the Bees was the first film streamed across the Internet, with the New York Times declaring it a “historic event."
