= Bee learning and communication =

Cognitive and sensory processes in bees

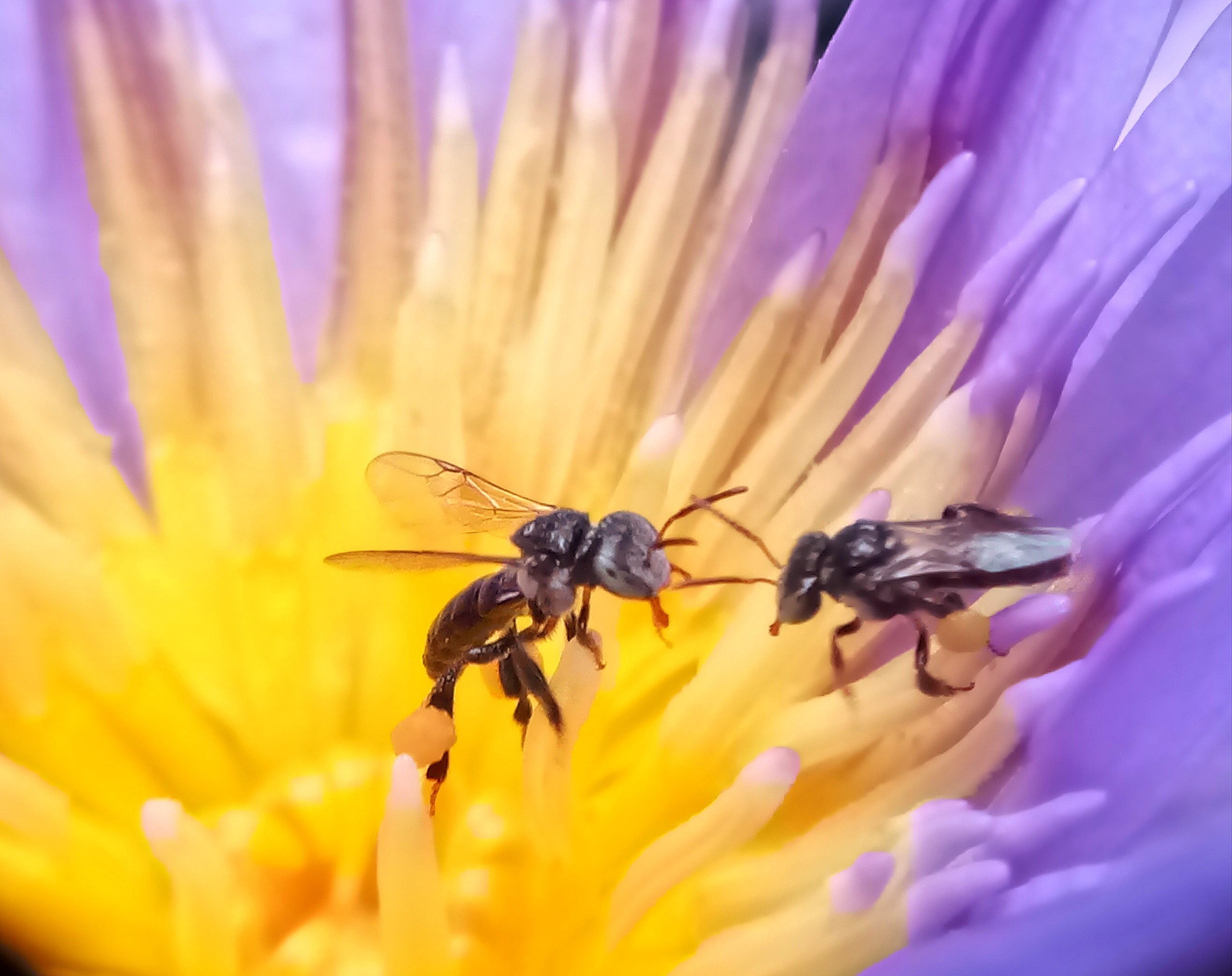
Bees learn and communicate in a variety of ways.

Bee learning and communication includes cognitive and sensory processes in all kinds of bees, that is the insects in the seven families making up the clade Anthophila. Some species have been studied more extensively than others, in particular Apis mellifera, or European honey bee. Color learning has also been studied in bumblebees.

Honey bees are sensitive to odors (including pheromones), tastes, and colors, including ultraviolet. They can demonstrate capabilities such as color discrimination through classical and operant conditioning and retain this information for several days at least; they communicate the location and nature of sources of food; they adjust their foraging to the times at which food is available; they may even form cognitive maps of their surroundings. They also communicate with each other by means of a "waggle dance" and in other ways.

== Learning ==
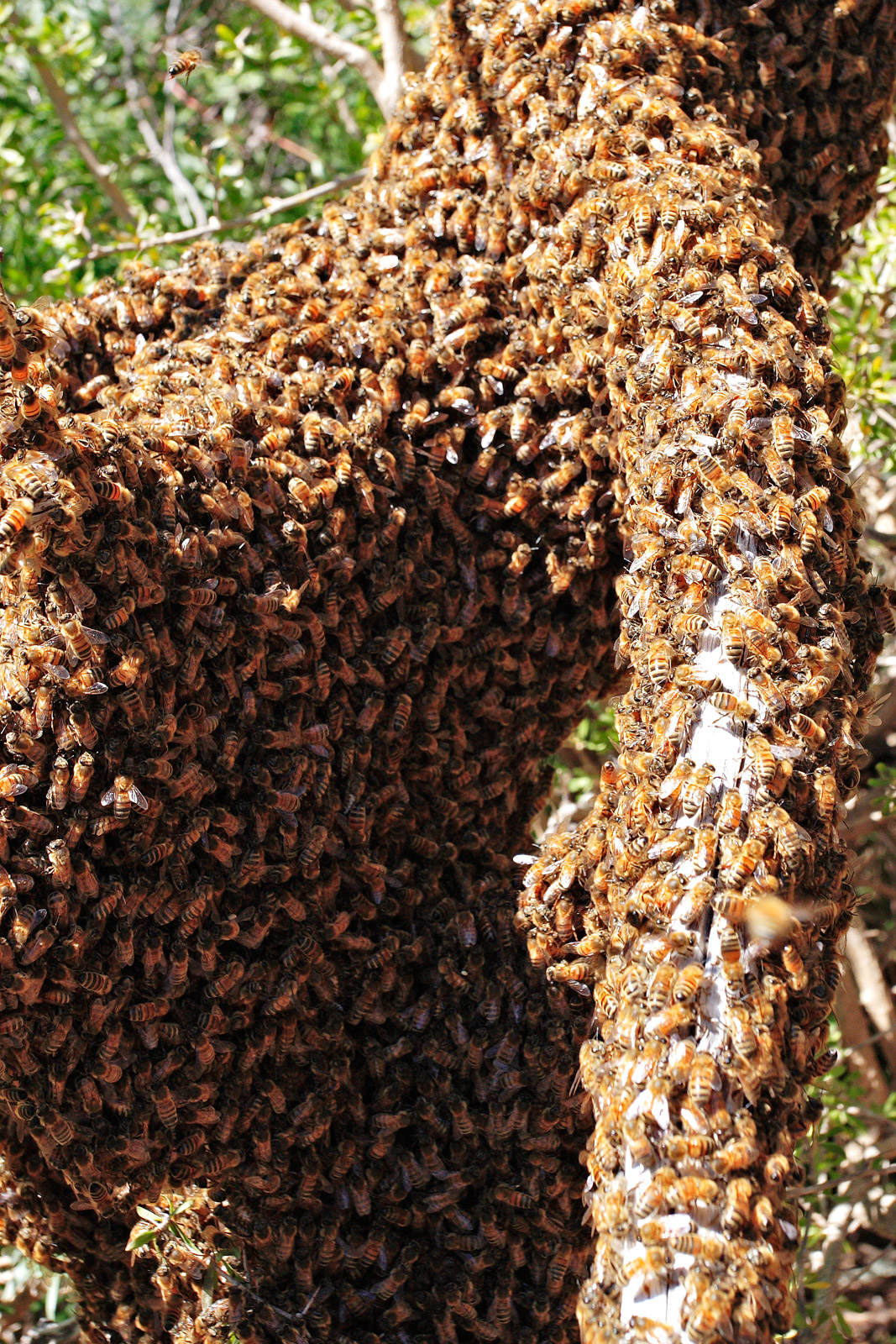
Swarming bees require good communication to all congregate in the same place

Honey bees are adept at associative learning, and many of the phenomena of operant and classical conditioning take the same form in honey bees as they do in the vertebrates. Efficient foraging requires such learning. For example, honey bees make few repeat visits to a plant if it provides little in the way of reward. A single forager will visit different flowers in the morning and, if there is sufficient reward in a particular kind of flower, she will make visits to that type of flower for most of the day, unless the plants stop producing nectar or weather conditions change.

=== Memory ===
A 2005 three-part study tested the working memory of honey bees, after learning to associate a certain pattern with a reward (delayed matching-to-sample). Bees were shown a pattern at the beginning of a tunnel, and then subjected to a series of variations: in the length of the tunnel (How long can bees retain the pattern in working memory?), in a choice between two patterns (matching and non-matching) placed at different distances (Can bees trained in the task continue to perform correctly when the matching pattern as well as a non-matching pattern are presented in the tunnel?); and a choice between two patterns (Can bees learn which of two sequentially encountered patterns in the tunnel is the pattern to be matched in the decision cylinder?). The researchers found that working memory in the honey bee is both robust and flexible. The experiments demonstrated that bees can choose between alternatives, determine if a stimulus is the same or different than one seen earlier, remember the earlier one for a short period, and generalize this performance to new pairs of stimuli. The bees retained information in working memory for about 5 seconds, and they might have been simultaneously learning a matching and a nonmatching task; further research was needed.

=== Color learning in honeybees ===
Honey bees are able to recognize, discriminate, and remember colors. Beginning in the early 1900s, scientists Karl von Frisch and later Randolf Menzel began asking questions about color vision and various aspects of color learning in bees.

Testing for color vision in honey bees. The majority of bees flew directly to the dish with the blue background as they had been trained to do. Thus, they were able to discriminate between gray and blue backgrounds, showing their capability for color vision.

The Austrian zoologist Karl von Frisch began the exploration of color vision in honey bees when, in 1919, he asked whether or not bees have color vision. He performed an elegant experiment that showed not only that the bees could discriminate colors but that they demonstrated associative learning. He first trained his bees to feed from a small dish filled with a nectar-like sugar water. This dish was placed on a piece of blue colored cardboard so that the color was visible to the bees as they arrived at the dish and fed. Next, von Frisch placed identically sized pieces of cardboard in varying shades of grey, each with a dish, all around the blue piece. Lacking color vision, the bees should visit one or more of the gray pieces as often as the blue piece, but he found the vast majority of the bees flew directly to the blue piece of cardboard on which they had previously obtained their reward. The bees largely ignored the gray pieces which had not been rewarded. Von Frisch repeated the experiment with other colors like violet and yellow and got the same results. Later other researchers used this experimental design to test the color vision of vertebrates.

The German scientist Randolf Menzel studied whether bees would learn certain colors faster than others. He used lights of various color and intensity to project circles of light on a surface, a set-up like that used by von Frisch except that, by using light instead of cardboard, Menzel was able to easily change the intensity and color of the circles.

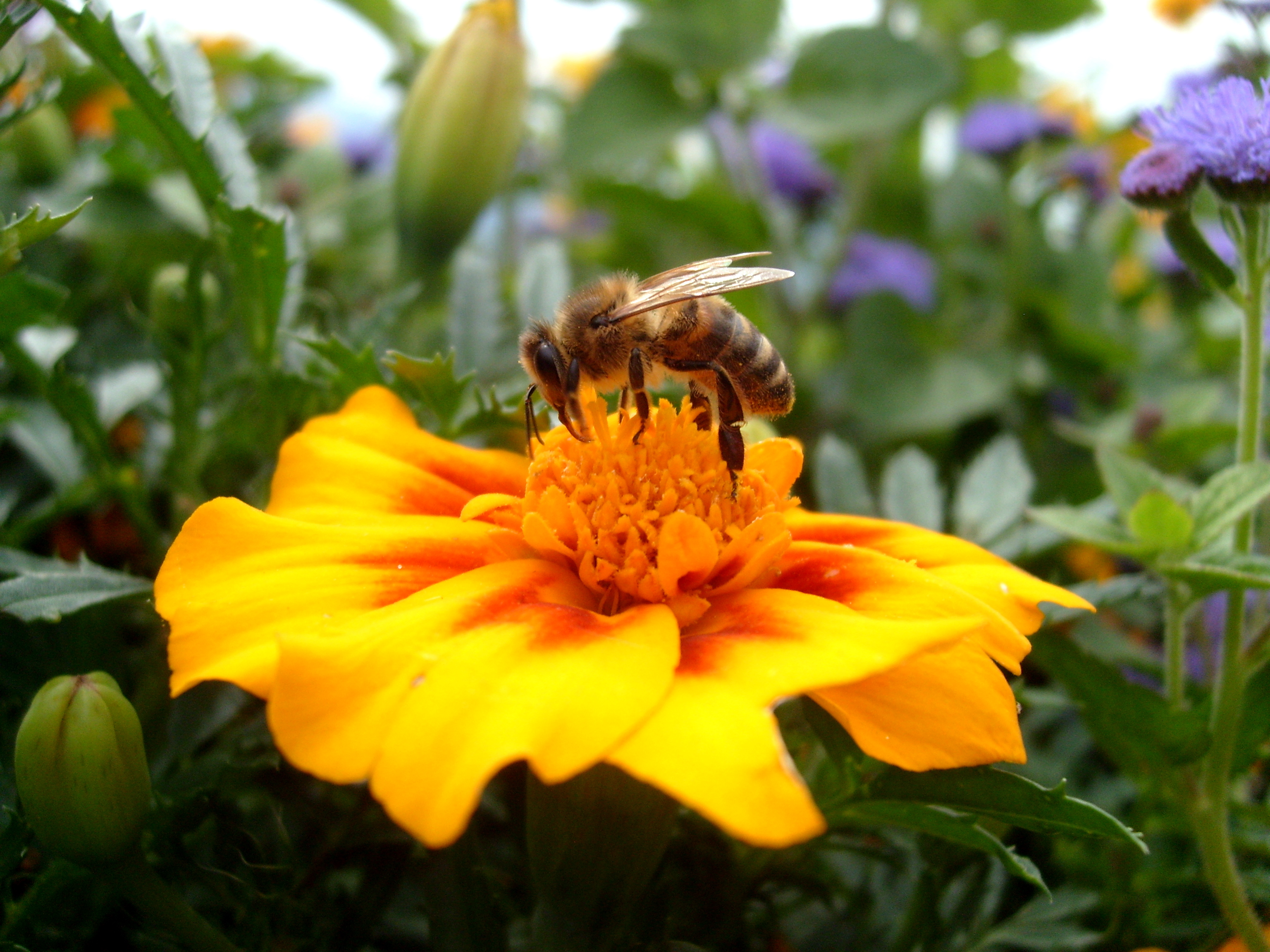
Honey bee collecting pollen

To test bees ability to distinguish between two different colors, Menzel placed a small dish containing sugar-water in one circle and a second empty dish some distance away on a differently colored circle. A single bee was placed equidistant between the two circles and allowed to choose between the dishes. The bees quickly learned to choose the color signaling the dish with the reward, and Menzel was able to measure how quickly the bees learned this task with various color differences.

Menzel's results showed that bees do not learn to discriminate between all color pairs equally well. Bees learned the fastest when violet light was rewarded, and the slowest when the light was green; the other colors fell somewhere in between. This evidence of inherent bias is evolutionarily reasonable, given that bees forage for differently-colored nectar-bearing flowers, many of which are to be found in green foliage which does not signal reward.

Menzel extended his experiments to study aspects of color learning and memory. He wanted to know how many trials bees need to reliably choose a previously rewarded color when they are presented with several alternatives, and how long they would remember the rewarded color. Menzel did several experiments to answer these questions. First, he gave individual bees a single sugar reward on a colored background. He then kept these bees in small cages for several days without any further trials. After a few days, he presented each bee with an array of several dishes, each on a different colored background. One of the colors was the same as that used during the initial trial, and the others were novel, unrewarded colors. Remarkably, after a single trial and several days without exposure to the rewarded color, bees correctly chose to explore the color used in the first trial more than fifty-percent of the time.

Menzel repeated this experiment with three initial trials with the rewarded color instead of just one. When, after several days in confinement, the bees were presented with a choice of colors they almost always chose the color that was used on the first three trials.

Menzel explored the timing of bee color learning by testing whether bees register color before, during, or after receiving their sugar-water reward. For this purpose he displayed the color beneath a rewarded dish at different stages of the feeding process: during approach, feeding and departure. He found that bees register color during both approach and feeding, and that they had to see the color for about a total of about 5 seconds, with best performance usually coming with about three seconds exposure during the approach and two seconds after landing and beginning to feed.

== Color learning in bumblebees ==
An American specialist in bee cognition, Dr. Felicity Muth, has studied the mechanism behind the associative learning in bumblebees, specifically Bombus impatiens. Bumblebees were shown to be able to learn multiple color-food associations and tended to continue to apply what they learned. In another study, Dr. Felicity Muth continued to learn more about these associations. Bumblebees initially preferred yellow anthers and blue corollas when foraging for pollen. After this initial test, they began associating floral color with pollen success. The bumblebees' association between pollen and features of the anther and petal also showed that they discriminated between rewarding and unrewarding patterns. This knowledge persisted, both after 24 hours of learning and after 7 days. Dr. Muth's studies have also shown that bumblebees do not prefer nor choose against a flower based on its complexity. However, they will learn those unique traits if the reward, the pollen, is great enough.

== Communication ==
Foragers communicate their floral findings in order to recruit other worker bees of the hive to forage in the same area. The factors that determine recruiting success are not completely known but probably include evaluations of the quality of nectar and/or pollen brought in.

There are two main hypotheses to explain how foragers recruit other workers—the "waggle dance" or "dance language" theory and the "odor plume" theory. The dance theory is far more widely accepted, and has far more empirical support than the odor theory. Supporters of the dance theory often grant odor a significant role in recruitment, while supporters of the odor theory have claimed that the dance is essentially irrelevant to recruitment. The academic debate between these theories has been polarized and sometimes hostile.

=== Dance communication ===
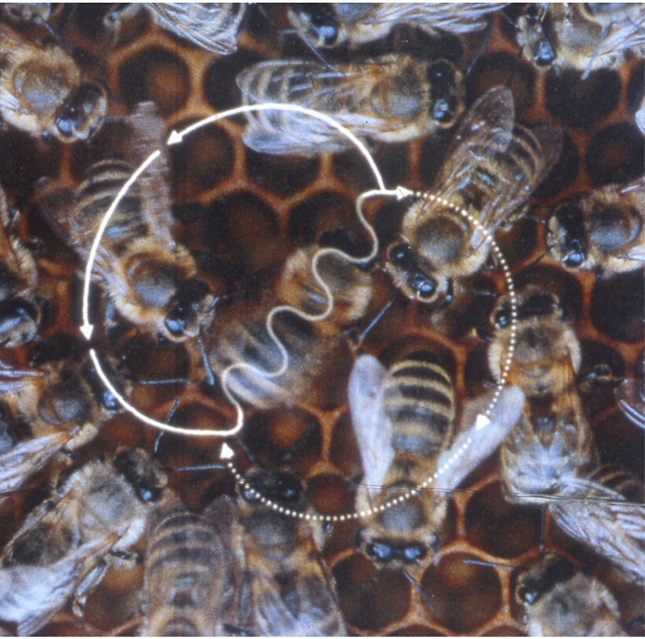
Figure-Eight-Shaped waggle dance of the honeybee (Apis mellifera). A waggle run oriented 45° to the right of ‘up' on the vertical comb indicates a food source 45° to the right of the direction of the sun outside the hive. The abdomen of the dancer appears blurred because of the rapid motion from side to side.

It has long been known that successfully foraging Western honey bees perform a waggle dance upon their return to the hive. The laden forager dances on the comb in a circular pattern, occasionally crossing the circle in a zig-zag or waggle pattern. Aristotle described this behaviour in his Historia Animalium. This waggle pattern of movement was thought to attract the attention of other bees. In 1947, Karl von Frisch correlated the runs and turns of the dance to the distance and direction of the food source from the hive. He reported that the orientation of the dance is correlated with the relative position of the sun to the food source, and the length of the waggle portion of the run is correlated to the distance of the food from the hive. Von Frisch also reported that the more vigorous the display is, the better the food. Von Frish published these and many other observations in his 1967 book The Dance Language and Orientation of Bees and in 1973 he was awarded the Nobel Prize in Physiology or Medicine for his discoveries.

Later work has supported Von Frisch's observations and added many details. It appears that all of the known species and races of honey bees exhibit the behavior, but details of its execution vary among the different species. For example, in Apis florea and Apis andreniformis (the "dwarf honeybees") the dance is performed on the dorsal, horizontal portion of the nest, which is exposed. The runs and dances point directly toward the resource in these species. Each honey bee species has a characteristically different correlation of "waggling" to distance, as well. Such species-specific behavior suggests that this form of communication does not depend on learning but is rather determined genetically. It also suggests how the dance may have evolved.

Other experiments further document the communicative nature of the waggle dance. For example, dances by robotic dummy bees induced some recruitment. Research has also shown that the dance may vary with the environmental context, a finding that may explain why the results of some earlier studies were inconsistent.

=== Odor plume ===
While many researchers believe that bee dances give enough information to locate resources, proponents of the odor plume theory argue that the dance gives little, or no actual guidance to a nectar source. They argue that bees instead are primarily recruited by odor. The purpose of the dance is simply to gain attention to the returning worker bee so she can share the odor of the nectar with other workers who will then follow the odor trail to the source. Most scientists agree that odor is used in recruitment to resources, but they differ strongly in opinion as to the information content of the dance.

The primary lines of evidence used by the odor plume advocates are

1. experiments with odorless sugar sources which show that worker bees are unable to recruit to those sources and
2. logical difficulties of a small-scale dance (a few centimeters across) giving directions precise enough to hold the other bees on course during a flight that could be several kilometers long. Misreading by even a few degrees would lead the bee off course by hundreds of meters at the far end.

Neither of these points invalidate the dance theory, but simply suggest that odor might be involved, which is indeed conceded by all proponents of dance theory. Critics of the odor plume theory counter that most natural nectar sources are relatively large—orchards or entire fields— so, precision may not be necessary or even desirable. They have also challenged the reproducibility of the odorless source experiment.

Odor learning in bees is usually tested by the proboscis extension reflex. Significant to the argument are the experiments of William F. Towne, of the Kutztown University in Pennsylvania, in which hives are moved to "mirror image" terrain settings, and the bees are thereby fooled into dancing about the wrong location for a nectar source. Foragers were successfully recruited to the wrong location, but only when the sun was obscured by clouds, forcing them to rely on terrain-based navigation rather than "solar ephemeris"-based navigation. As the cloud cover broke up, more and more bees corrected their dances to indicate the actual location of nectar, and forager visits shifted to the correct location.

Odor is essential and even necessary at various stages of the recruitment process, including once a recruited forager reaches the vicinity of the resource while some scientists think that dancing may be a simple idiothetic movement that conveys no information. Others see the dance as conveying information, but doing it poorly compared to other means and potentially used backup approach.

Note: much of the research on the two competing hypotheses of communication has been restricted to Western honey bees, according to F.C. Dyer. Other species of Apis use variants on the same theme, and other types of bees use other methods altogether.

=== Trophallaxis ===
The exchange of food, trophallaxis, can be used to communicate the quality of a food source, temperature, a need for water, and the condition of the queen (Sebeok, 1990).

2004 research under Zachary Huang, indicates that primer pheromones play an important part in how a honey bee colony adjusts its distribution of labor most beneficially. To survive as a bee colony of sometimes 50,000–100,000 individual bees, the communal structure has to be adaptable to seasonal changes and the availability of food. The division of labor has to adjust itself to the resources available from foraging. While the division of labor in a bee colony is quite complex, the work can be roughly seen as work inside the hive and outside the hive. Younger bees play a role inside the hive while older bees play a role outside the hive mostly as foragers. Huang's team found that forager bees gather and carry a chemical called ethyl oleate in the stomach. The forager bees feed this primer pheromone to the worker bees, and the chemical keeps them in a nurse bee state. The pheromone prevents the nurse bees from maturing too early to become forager bees. As forager bees die off, less of the ethyl oleate is available and nurse bees more quickly mature to become foragers. It appears that this control system is an example of decentralized decision making in the bee colony.

Bees like Trigona corvina rely on pheromones for much of their communication with nest mates and rivals. They produce pheromones from their labial glands. The function of signaling depends on the profitability, but they commonly will scent mark a food source either for self-orientation, to deter rivals or to direct a nest mate to the resource. Once an individual finds a good food source, they will return to the same source for many days. If an individual detects the scent of a rival bee, they will avoid the plant in order to avoid conflict and to save time. It has also been shown that pheromones are a method of sexual selection between male drones and queens.

== Cognition ==
Experiments by James Gould suggest that honey bees may have a cognitive map for information they have learned, and utilize it when foraging. In an experimental demonstration, Gould lured some bees to a dish of artificial nectar, then gradually moved it farther from the hive. He marked the trained bees, placed them in a darkened jar, and relocated them to a spot where the dish could not be seen but the hive was still visible. When released one by one, the bees appeared disoriented for a few seconds, then flew directly to the dish, 73 of 75 bees reaching it in about 28 seconds. They apparently accomplished this feat by devising a new flight path based on a cognitive map of visible landmarks.

Interpretations of another test suggested not only the use of a map, but also an ability to remember and combine relevant information. Gould moved a supply of sugar water 25% farther away from a hive each day. The bees communicated the location of the water to each other as usual. Then a researcher in his lab placed the sugar water on a boat in the middle of a small lake. When scouts returned to the hive to communicate their find, Gould claimed that other bees refused to go with them, even though they frequently flew over the lake to reach pollen sources on the opposite shore. To Gould, these observations suggested that "bees somehow consider information to see if it makes sense before they act on it". No one observed behavior of bees in the hive during this experiment, however, and when the experiment was replicated by Wray et al. in 2008, the researchers found no evidence for Gould's assertion that followers of waggle dances advertising "implausible" sites refused to respond to these dances. The authors' conclusion: "Contrary to prior findings, our results provide no evidence that honeybees assess the plausibility of information contained in waggle dances or reject dances for locations that are unlikely to yield food. Thus, we conclude that the original Lake Experiment should no longer be cited as evidence that honeybees possess cognitive maps, ‘insight’ or ‘imagination’."

A 2026 study found that bumblebees spontaneously used a tool to reach a reward, without prior training or trial-and-error learning. The bees rolled a polystyrene ball to a specific spot and used it to climb and reach a sugar-filled artificial flower. This form of insight and problem-solving has previously been documented only in some primates, elephants, and crows. The study's senior author, Dr Olli Loukola, suggested the findings might challenge the widespread assumption that insects are "reflex-based machines" and incapable of having emotional states.

== Neurobiology of color vision ==
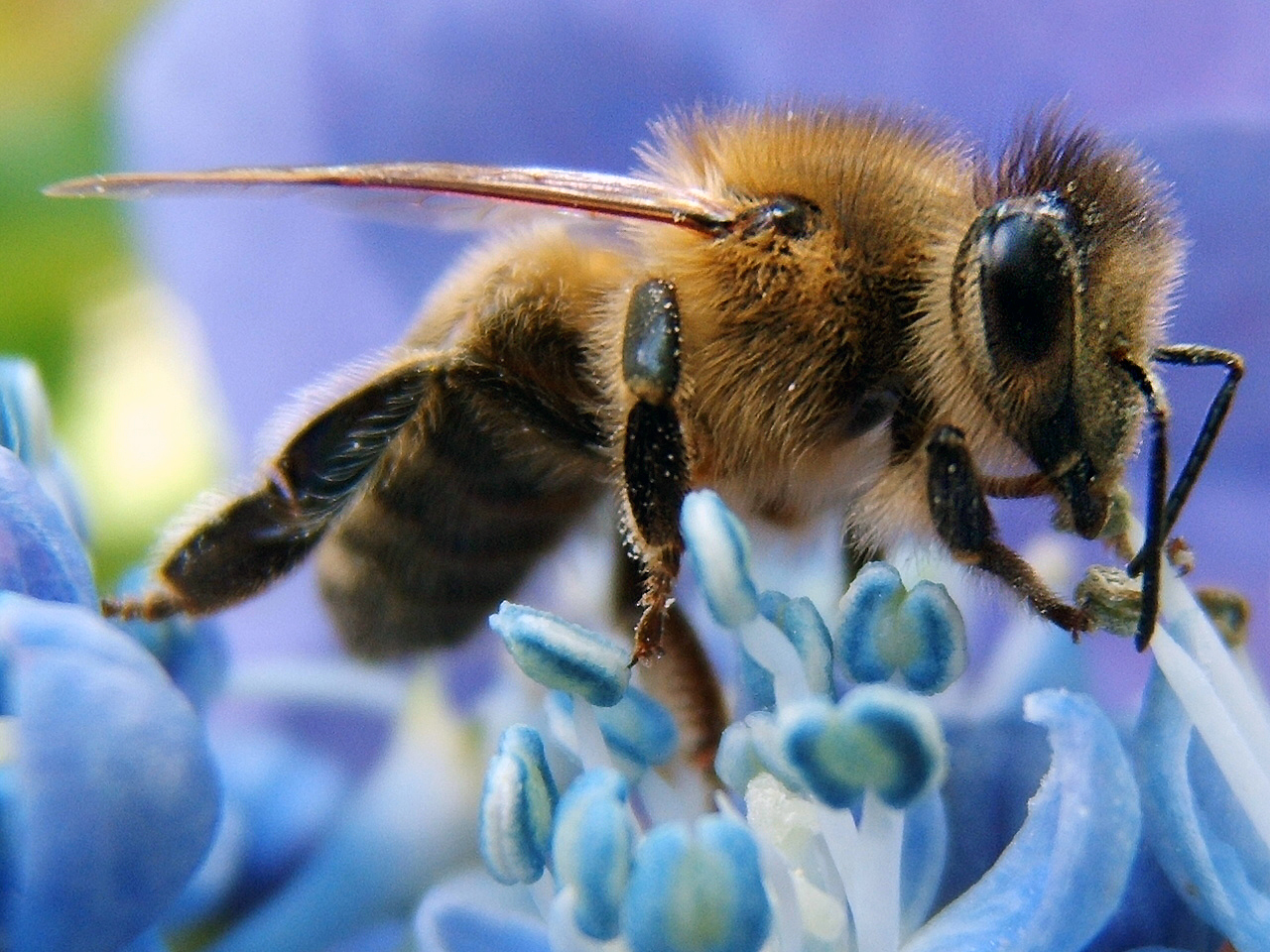
Western honey bee

A seminal paper by Menzel (1975) described the morphology and spectral sensitivity of the honey bee eye that underlie their color vision. He examined color-coding in the honey bee retina by marking individual cells with a fluorescent dye and recording from these cells as single units. From this analysis he determined that there are three types of receptors in the honey bee eye: 1) UV receptors, 2) blue receptors, and 3) green receptors The three receptors contain three rhodopsin-like pigments which have maximal absorbance at wavelengths of 350 nm, 440 nm, and 540 nm. Menzel also found that most of the cells he studied had secondary sensitivities that corresponded to wavelength regions at which the other two receptor types were maximally active. He used spectral efficiency experiments to suggest that these secondary sensitivities result from electric coupling between the receptors.

Certain morphologies distinguished the receptor types. UV cells were found to have long visual nerve fibers that penetrated the lamina with deep tree-like branchings. Blue and green receptor cells had more shallow fibers.

== See also ==
- Bumblebee communication
- Eusociality
- Grooming dance
- Trained hymenoptera
- Tremble dance
- Waggle dance
- Zoosemiotics

== Bibliography ==
- Leoncini I, Le Conte Y, Costagliola G, Plettner E, Toth AL, Wang M, Huang Z, Becard JM, Crauser D, Slessor KN, Robinson GE (December 14, 2004). "Regulation of behavioral maturation by a primer pheromone produced by adult worker honey bees". Proceedings of the National Academy of Sciences of the United States of America. 101 (50): 17559–64. Bibcode:2004PNAS..10117559L. doi:10.1073/pnas.0407652101. PMC 536028. PMID 15572455.
- Miller, Julie Ann (April 23, 1983). "Do Bees Plan Ahead Intelligently?". Science News. 123 (17). Society for Science: 271. doi:10.2307/3967590. JSTOR 3967590.
- Sebeok, T. A. (1990). Essays in Zoosemiotics. Toronto: Toronto Semiotic Circle. ISSN 0838-5858.
