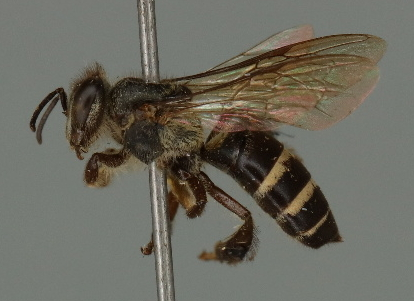
- Apis andreniformis, British Natural History Museum specimen

Scientific classification
- Kingdom: Animalia
- Phylum: Arthropoda
- Clade: Pancrustacea
- Class: Insecta
- Order: Hymenoptera
- Family: Apidae
- Genus: Apis
- Subgenus: Micrapis
- Species: A. andreniformis

Binomial name
- Apis andreniformis F. Smith, 1858
- Range of Apis andreniformis

= Apis andreniformis =

Species of bee

Apis andreniformis, or the black dwarf honey bee, is a relatively rare species of honey bee whose native habitat is the tropical and subtropical regions of Southeast Asia.

A. andreniformis was the fifth honey bee species to be described of the seven known species of Apis. (Note: There are 8 known species now with the addition of Apis laboriosa.) Until recently, however, the actual identity of the species was poorly understood. It was not recognized as its own species, but was instead considered to be a part of the species Apis florea. Recent studies have highlighted notable differences between the bees and have thus separated them into distinct species.

== Taxonomy and phylogeny ==
Apis andreniformis is a part of the family Apidae, which includes honey, cuckoo, carpenter, digger, bumble, and stingless bees. The genus Apis includes honey bees, the most common being Apis mellifera, otherwise known as the Western honey bee. A. andreniformis is most closely related to Apis florea, its sister species with which it is commonly seen in sympatric distribution throughout southeast Asia.

== Description and identification ==
=== Physical characteristics ===
A. andreniformis can be distinguished from other Apis species by noting their dark black coloration, making them the darkest of their genus. Originally, it was thought that A. andreniformis was a part of the species A. florea, but recent studies have noted morphological differences that have separated the two. Some distinctions include: structural differences in the endophalli, a larger wing venation in A. andreniformis, and a longer basitarsal extension in A. florea. Additionally, there are slight color variations between the two species. In typical A. andreniformis, its first two abdominal segments are black and its scutellum is reddish brown, while in A. florea, the first two abdominal segments are reddish brown and their scutellum is black, though there is some variation that makes color unreliable. Another distinguishing factor is the presence of black hairs on the tibia of A. andreniformis, which are white in A. florea.

Other differentiating characteristics include cubital indexes and proboscis length. A. andreniformis has an index of 6.37, while A. florea has one of 2.86. The proboscis of A. andreniformis has a length of 2.80 mm, while that of A. florea is 3.27 mm.

Within the species, queens can typically be distinguished from workers and drones by their near entire black coloration.

=== Nest structure ===
A. andreniformis nests are made of a single comb found hanging from small twigs in quiet forests, generally in darker areas where there is 25 to 30% of normal sunlight. This type of nest is called an open-air nest. They are commonly found hanging in small trees, shrubs, or bushes are usually hidden behind leaves or branches to avoid detection. They are usually built between 1 and 15 meters from the ground, though the average altitude is 2.5 m. The honeycomb typically ranges from 70 to 90 mm in size. This nest is distinct from other Apis species, like A. mellifera, who build their nests inside of cavities. This open-air structure—found also in A. florea, A. dorsata, and A. laboriosa—along with a relatively flat line of nectar cells along the top, creates a plateau above the nest that can be used as a stage for their communication method known as the waggle dance.

While creating the nest, plant resin is placed along the supporting branch and around the edges of the nest. This acts as a barrier against small insects, like ants, that may try to enter the nest. The major location of honey storage can be found in the area above and surrounding the branch. The entire area below the honey storage and branch is the brood area, where larva development occurs. Along the top of the brood area is the location of pollen storage. Drone development occurs in the cells toward the bottom of the nest, while queen cells can be found protruding vertically.

== Distribution and habitat ==
A. andreniformis is found in southeast Asia, specifically southern China, India, Burma, Laos, Vietnam, Thailand, Malaysia, Indonesia, and the Philippines. They are commonly found in sympatric distribution with A. florea. Although they are sympatrically distributed, it is uncommon to have nests of different species in the same tree or bush. Each species tends to be found closer to nests of its own species rather than its sister species. A. andreniformis is considered a lowland species because they are most commonly found in elevations below 1,000 m, although they may migrate to higher elevations during rainy seasons. Similarly, they are found in tropical and subtropical regions, while cavity-dwelling honey bees can be found in colder climates.

== Behavior ==
=== Queen determination ===
Queens are not genetically determined so any young female larva can become either a worker or a queen. In order to create a queen cell, royal jelly must be fed to the female larva. In cases of an unexpected loss of a queen, royal jelly is fed to a female worker larva to create a new emergency queen. Although emergency queen rearing is possible, most often, the loss of a queen results in the dispersal of a colony. If a queen becomes separated from her hive, the workers will leave the nest to search for her. Finding and joining a queen is an innate response for workers. The workers' strong attraction to queens is seen when a queen is lost, after a hive disruption by a predator, and during colony migration.

=== Queenless and interspecific colonies ===
In an Apis andrenformis queenright colony, worker policing occurs, which prevents workers from laying their own eggs and helps maintain the dominance hierarchy. After the loss of a queen, workers will first try to rear a new queen using royal jelly. If this fails, worker policing will decrease and workers will activate their ovaries in order to rear more drones before the colony dies. It is also possible for queenless colonies to adopt a queen from a related species, specifically Apis florea. This may suggest that worker bees of A. andreniformis are attracted to queen bee pheromones, even those belonging to other species in the same genera. Once inside the colony of A. florea, the non-natal workers of A. andreniformis may attempt to lay their own eggs in order to continue propagating their species, an action known as reproductive parasitism. In a study conducted by Sitthipong Wongvilas et al., they found that most eggs laid by the non-natal A. andreniformis were policed by the queenright workers of the A. florea colony. Although they adopted A. andreniformis workers in the hive, A. florea workers policed non-natal larvae, thereby preventing interspecies parasitism. Queenright colonies of A. andreniformis have also been observed to adopt queenless workers of A. florea as well, but their policing on non-natal larvae has not yet been studied.

=== Dominance hierarchy ===
Unlike cavity-dwelling honey bees whose queen has a distinct chemical signal from that of the worker bees, A. andreniformis queens have similar chemical signals as their workers. Chemical signals secreted from the mandibular gland in A. andreniformis are not caste-determining like it is in other honey bees. As stated previously, the presence of royal jelly on young female larva produced the queen bee. Drones, or male bees, are not used for pollination or honey production, but are instead used only to mate with the queen.

=== Communication ===
Different types of honey bees may use different types of dances to communicate with their hive. Most cavity-dwelling species use vertical waggle dances, while open-air nesters do not perform a gravity oriented waggle dance and instead perform a horizontal dance. The shape of the nest creates a platform above the nest that can be used as a stage for communication. The dance is a straight run pointing directly to the source of pollen or nectar that the forager has visited. Since the dance of other Apis species is vertical, it is not actually directed towards the food source, as it is in A. andreniformis.

=== Mating behavior ===
Queens of A. andreniformis commonly engage in polyandry, where the queen will mate with multiple drones, usually about 10-20 times in total. Due to the large amount of mating, queens must expel any excess semen. Excessive mating puts females at increased risk to predation since it must occur during flight and outside the nest in the open air. She is also at risk for sexually transmitted diseases and injury from unexpected inclement weather. Some Apis males put a "mating sign" in the sting chamber of the queen that she is unable to remove. This prevents her from avoiding unwanted copulation with other drones. In contrast, this sign is not found in A. andreniformis, suggesting that queens have control over the number of mates they copulate with. Although there is a lot of risk to the queen, benefits may arise from the increased genetic diversity within the colony. Genetic diversity can lead to increased resistance to disease and illnesses.

== Kin selection ==
In studies, A. andreniformis has shown a lack of recognition for its own species and nestmates. This has been shown in studies where queenless colonies of A. florea have joined the colony of A. andreniformis without facing aggression upon their initial arrival. Similarly, queenless colonies of A. andreniformis have been seen to join A. florea colonies, but in these cases, any A. andreniformis larvae are usually destroyed by the host colony, preventing parasitism from the foreign species. Worker bees of A. florea have complete reproductive dominance over A. Andreniformis in a queenless nest because they have recognition and kin selection, while A. Andreniformis does not. However, when a queen is present, worker bees do not reproduce and parasitism is turned off.

== Parasites ==
The main parasites of both A. andreniformis and A. florea belong to genus Euvarroa. However, A. andreniformis is attacked by the species Euvarroa wongsirii, while Euvarroa sinhai preys on A. florea, although Euvarroa sinhai have been found in hive debri of A. mellifera colonies it has not yet been confirmed to parasitize on them. The two species of Euvarroa have morphological and biological differences: while E. wongsirii has a triangular body shape and a length of 47 to 54 micrometres, E. sinhai has a more circular shape and a length of 39 to 40 micrometres.

== Human importance ==
Honey bees, as a whole, tend to provide many useful products for human consumption. For A. andreniformis specifically, some commercial products include royal jelly, wax, honey, and bee venoms. Additionally, they are important for the pollination of flowers and plants.
