= Ligurian =

Ligurian may refer to:

- Ligurian, pertaining to modern Liguria in Italy
- Ligurian, pertaining to the ancient Ligures
- Ligurian language, a modern Romance language spoken in parts of Italy, France, Monaco and Argentina
- Ligurian language (ancient), an extinct language spoken by the ancient Ligures
- Ligurian Sea, an arm of the Mediterranean Sea
- Ligurian bee, a type of Italian bee (Apis mellifera ligustica)
