= Maxim Petrov =

Russian serial killer

- Born: Maxim Vladimirovich Petrov; 14 November 1965 (age 60); Kolpino, Leningrad Oblast, RSFSR, Soviet Union
- Other name: Doctor Death
- Conviction: Murder
- Penalty: Life imprisonment

Details
- Victims: 11–19
- Span of crimes: 1999–2000
- Country: Russia
- Date apprehended: 17 January 2000

Maxim Vladimirovich Petrov (Russian: Максим Владимирович Петров, born 1965) is a Russian serial killer, convicted for the killing of 11 people in St Petersburg between 1999 and 2000. Petrov, nicknamed Doctor Death by the Russian media, was a practicing doctor who targeted patients from a local health center, killing them by lethal injection at their homes then robbing them.

Petrov was sentenced to life imprisonment and is suspected to have killed up to 19 people until his arrest.

== Background ==
Maxim Vladimirovich Petrov worked as an emergency doctor in St Petersburg, living in the central Vasilievsky Island area of the city. Petrov got married twice and has three children, one from his first marriage and two from his second marriage.

== Crimes ==
=== Early robberies ===
In 1997, Petrov began robbing his patients by visiting their homes unannounced and usually in the morning when relatives would be at work. He would then measure their blood pressure and suggest they needed an injection which anaesthetized them. While they were unconscious, Petrov stole their possessions, even taking rings and earrings from his victims' bodies. The first few victims did not die, instead waking up later after he had left. Petrov committed 47 robberies until his arrest in 2000.

=== Murders ===
Petrov committed his first murder on 2 February 1999 during his thirtieth robbery, when he was interrupted by the daughter of an anaesthetised patient who returned home while he was stealing. He stabbed the daughter with a screwdriver and then strangled the unconscious patient with a stocking. After this, Petrov's modus operandi changed: he began to use a lethal mix of a variety of different drugs to inject into his victims instead of an anaesthetic so that the victim would die, and so the police would think that the killer had little medical knowledge. Petrov would then set fire to their homes to destroy any evidence.

== Arrest and conviction ==
The police did not release a photofit of the suspect, thinking he would soon be caught. However, it took until the following year for them to realise how the victims were being selected. All were included in the same list of lung patients who had undergone a fluorography. Using this list, they identified 72 possible future victims in an operation called "Medbrat" ("Male Nurse") involving 700 police officers. They arrested Petrov when he visited one of the patients on 17 January 2000. On his arrest, Petrov admitted to the murders but recanted his confession a few months later, blaming it on the intense psychological pressure he had endured while in custody. Various possessions stolen from the victims were later found in his flat, though he had already sold others at the market. Six of the patients who were not killed were seriously injured.

Petrov was suspected of committing 19 murders but tried for just 17. In 2002, Petrov was found guilty of 11 murders and was sentenced by judge Valentina Kudriashova to life imprisonment.

== See also ==
- Dr John Bodkin Adams – Irish doctor suspected of killing patients
- Harold Shipman – British doctor and serial killer
- List of Russian serial killers
- List of serial killers by number of victims
