= Thomas White Woodbury =

English journalist and beekeeper

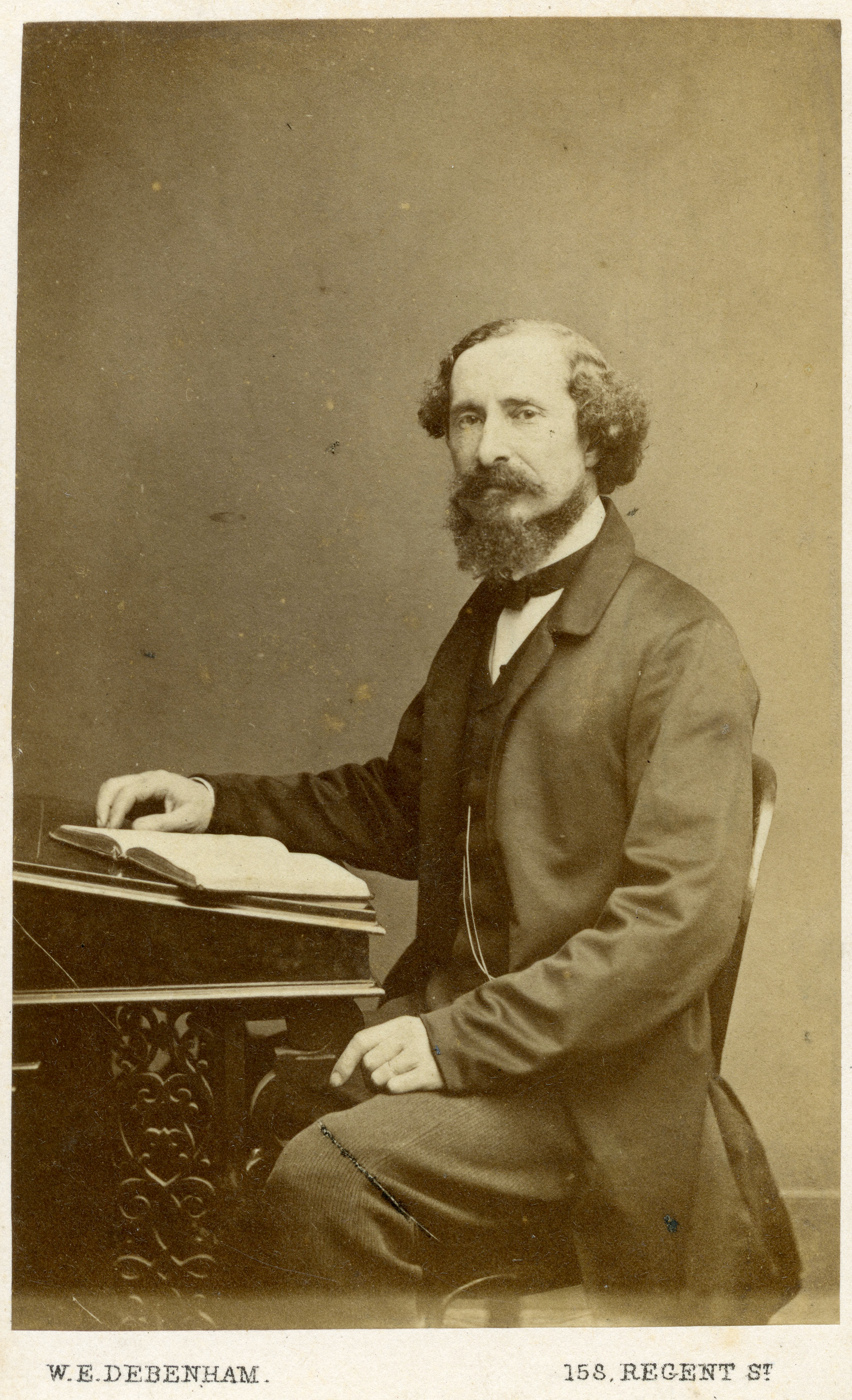

Thomas White Woodbury (18 December 1818 – 1871) was an English journalist and beekeeper, devoting himself entirely to beekeeping from 1850 onwards after the death of his son. He innovated hive designs and was responsible for introducing Ligurian or Italian bees to Britain in 1859. He wrote to the Journal of Horticulture where he had a section on bees to which his contributions were signed as "A Devonshire bee-keeper". Charles Darwin corresponded with him while examining variations in domesticated bees.

== Life and work ==
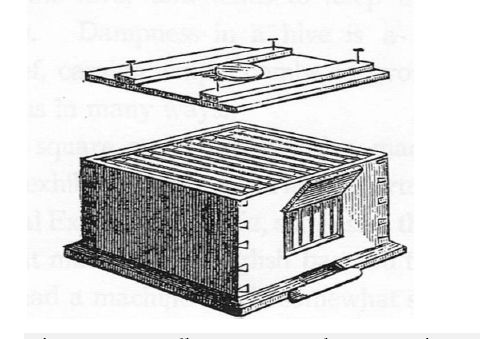
Woodbury's Bar and Frame Hive with the Lid Elevated

Woodbury was born in London, the only son of a distinguished linguist W. H. Woodbury who moved the family to Exeter due to the delicate health of their son and was a partner of "The Exeter and Plymouth Gazette". At the age of seventeen Woodbury joined his father's newspaper business and contributed prose and poetry. He also began to keep bees and made his own hives based on Taylor's Handbook of bee-keeping. He married in 1846 and from 1849 he spent more time on bee-keeping and lived in Edgbaston. He later moved to 17 Lower Mount Radford Terrace, Exeter, in Devon, where he had a garden with bee-hives. The death of his only son interrupted his work and from 1858 he began to write to horticultural journals where he signed his articles as "A Devonshire Bee-keeper". In 1859 he introduced Italian bees into England and still later bees from Egypt which he found too aggressive. Some of the earliest Italian bees were sent from England to Australia at the request of Edward Wilson (1813–1878), president of the 'Acclimatization Society of Victoria'. The bees left England in September 1862, spending 79 days at sea in Woodbury hives before landing at Melbourne.

In 1859 Woodbury imported a yellow Ligurian queen from Mr Hermann in Switzerland. She arrived by train on 3 August in a rough deal box with about a thousand worker bees. Woodbury had prepared an 8-bar hive, including four frames of honey and pollen plus one empty comb, and he gently shook the newcomers into this. Then he took a skep of local black bees weighing 34.5 pounds and shook them out in clusters on four cloths spread out on the grass; helped by his friend Mr Fox. He found and took out the queen, before placing the hive with Ligurian queen and bees over the shaken bees. Alas they fought, and in the morning there were many dead bees, but he hoped for the best. By 17 August, great loads of pollen were going in, and he knew that the first queen from outside Britain had been introduced. When he wrote about this in the 'Cottage Gardener' he had letters from all over the country asking for stocks from this queen for next year, so at once he telegraphed for two more queens (one for Mr Fox) and they arrived on 27 August having been four days on the way. Although most of the bees were dead, each package had their queen still living, and each queen was successfully introduced to a colony. Ron Brown Great Masters of Beekeeping

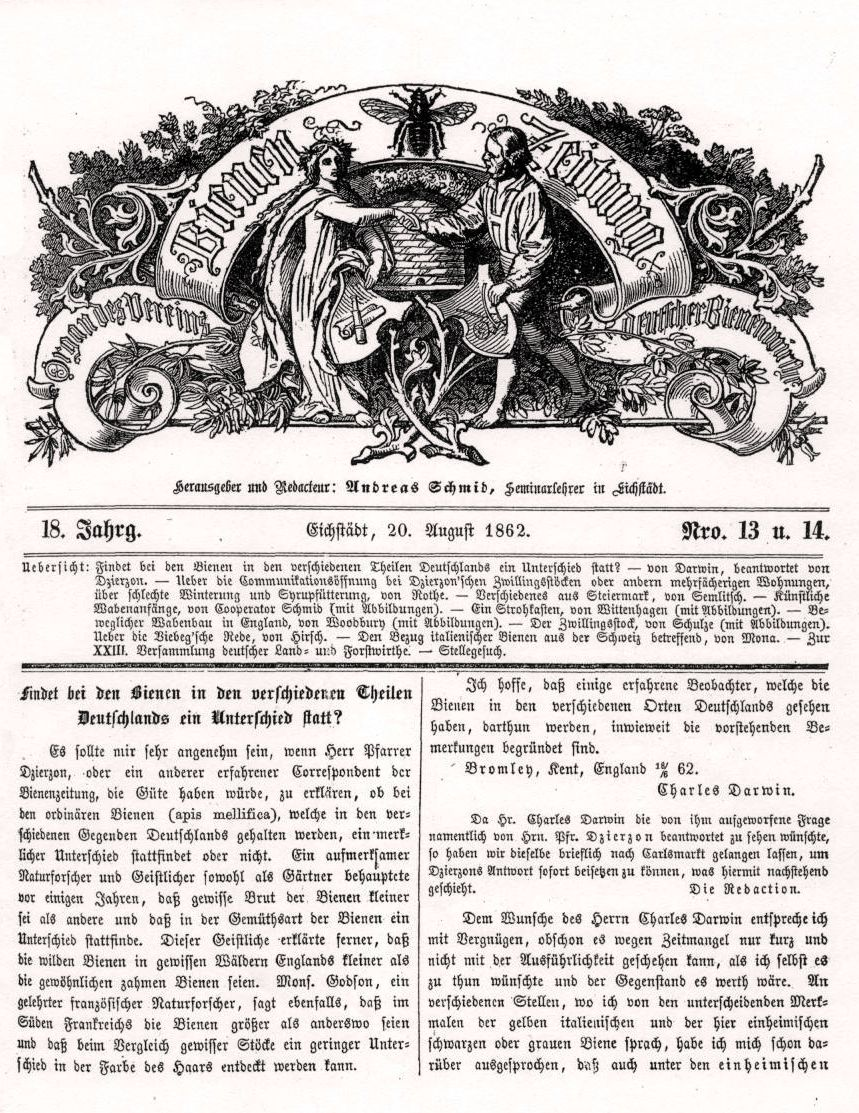
Charles Darwin's letter in the "Bienen Zeitung"

Woodbury held strong views on the superiority of Ligurian bees over the native Old English Black bee (A. m. mellifera). An article by him published in the "Bath and West of England Agricultural Journal" in 1862.

From my strongest Ligurian stock I took eight artificial swarms in the spring, besides depriving it of numerous brood combs. Finding in June that the bees were collecting honey so fast that the queen could not find an empty cell in which to lay an egg, I was reluctantly compelled to put on a super. When this had been filled with 38 lbs. of the finest honeycomb, l removed it, and as the stock hive, a very large one, could not contain the multitude of bees which issued from the super, I formed them into another very large artificial swarm. The foregoing facts speak for themselves; but as information on this point has been very generally asked, I have no hesitation in saying that l believe the Ligurian honey-bee to be infinitely superior in every respect to the only species that we have hitherto been acquainted with.

He further developed the Langstroth hive design of Rev. L.L. Langstroth, which featured a movable frame around the bee space. His version was known as the 'Woodbury Hive' and was marketed on his behalf by George Neighbour & Sons, the London specialists in beekeeping supplies. He was a regular contributor under the name of "A Devonshire Beekeeper" to the "Cottage Gardener", "Journal of Horticulture", "Gardeners' Chronicle", and "The Times".

Charles Darwin's enquiry about possible varieties of honeybee in Germany, landed on the desk of Woodbury, who at the time was editor of the bee section of the "Journal of Horticulture", and was forwarded by him to the German journal "'Bienen Zeitung'" in 1862. The following year Woodbury suggested to Darwin that it might be interesting to compare the cell sizes of Apis indica with those of the European species. He also tried to introduce Apis dorsata from India to England.

Woodbury died after an illness of nine months leaving two daughters and his wife.
