= Florești =

Florești may refer to several places:

== Moldova ==
- Florești, Moldova, a city in Moldova
- Florești District, in Moldova
- Florești, a village in Cobusca Veche Commune, Anenii Noi District
- Florești, a village in Buciumeni Commune, Ungheni District

== Romania ==
- Florești, Cluj, a commune in Cluj County
- Florești, Mehedinți, a commune in Mehedinţi County
- Florești, Prahova, a commune in Prahova County
- Florești, a village in Bucium Commune, Alba County
- Florești, a village in Câmpeni Town, Alba County
- Florești, a village in Râmeț Commune, Alba County
- Florești, a village in Scărișoara Commune, Alba County
- Floreşti, a village in Căiuți Commune, Bacău County
- Floreşti, a village in Huruiești Commune, Bacău County
- Floreşti, a village in Scorțeni Commune, Bacău County
- Floreşti, a village in Nimigea Commune, Bistrița-Năsăud County
- Floreşti, a village in Beceni Commune, Buzău County
- Floreşti, a village in Todireni Commune, Botoșani County
- Floreşti, a village in Șimnicu de Sus Commune, Dolj County
- Floreşti, a village in Florești-Stoenești Commune, Giurgiu County
- Floreşti, a village in Țânțăreni Commune, Gorj County
- Floreşti, a village in Laslea Commune, Sibiu County
- Floreşti, a village in Horia Commune, Tulcea County
- Floreşti, a village in Poienești Commune, Vaslui County

== See also ==
- Florea (name)
- Florescu (surname)
