= Alhambra (1855) =

1853 steamer ship

Coordinates: 32°53′S 151°54′E

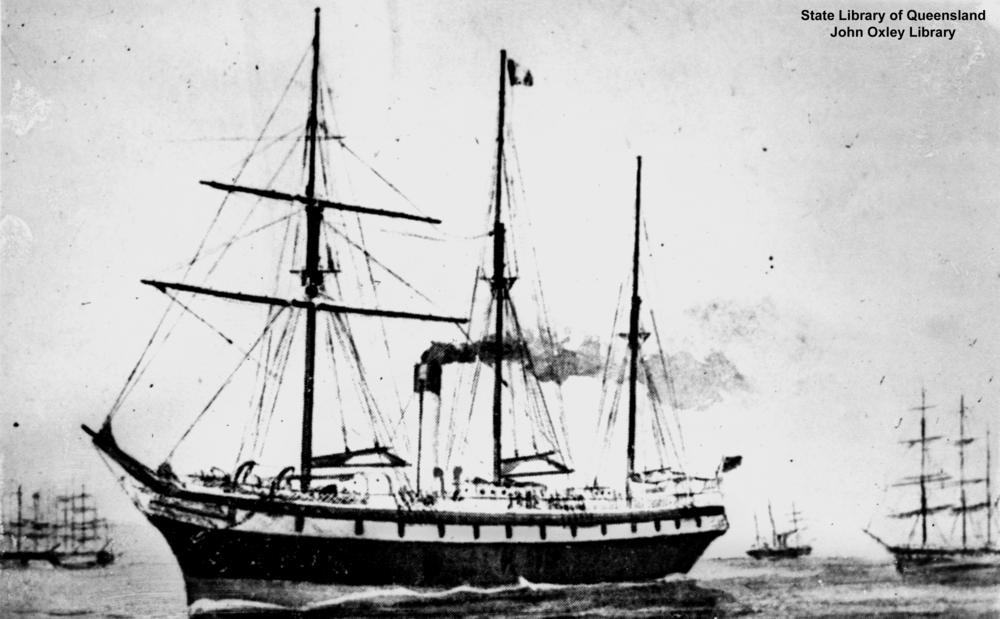
- The Alhambra

History

New South Wales
- Name: Alhambra
- Owner: Peninsular and Oriental Steam Navigation Company (1855–1862)
- Port of registry: London 1855–1862; Melbourne 1862–1882; Sydney 1882–1888
- Builder: Samuda Brothers Cubitt Town, London
- Launched: 31 May 1855
- Completed: 1855
- Maiden voyage: 7 July 1855
- Identification: Official number 24758; Registration number 56/1883; (United Kingdom) Melbourne; Code Letters PCFM
- Fate: Sank 30 June 1888

General characteristics
- Type: Iron steamer screw
- Tonnage: 766 GRT; 497 NRT
- Length: 63.8 m
- Beam: 8.3 m
- Draught: 5.0 m
- Installed power: Geared steam engine Humphrys, Tennant and Dykes 140hp (454 ihp (339 kW)?)
- Propulsion: Single screw
- Speed: 10 knots (19 km/h)

The Alhambra was an iron steamer screw built in 1853 by Samuda Brothers at Cubitt Town, London. It was wrecked in a collision off Newcastle, near Nobbys Head, New South Wales, on 30 June 1888.

== Construction ==
The Alhambra was named Cintra during its design. It was later renamed Braganza, which was finally changed to its current name shortly before the ship was launched on 31 May 1855. The name is derived from Al-Hambra, the Red Palace, an ancient fortress of the Moorish monarchs of Granada in southern Spain.

== Service history ==
The Alhambra took its maiden voyage to Marseille on 7 July 1855. It entered service in Gibraltar on 18 August 1856, and in May the following year was reported as loading in London for Portland Bay.

On 18 August 1857, Alhambra sailed for Mauritius from the Port of Geelong. In July, the ship experienced machinery failure off Portuguese coast. It was towed from Lisbon to Blackwall for repairs. On 27 December 1860, the ship returned to Southampton/Lisbon service until it was sold to McMechan Blackwood and Co. on 1 July 1862. On 26 September, the Alhambra sailed from Southampton for Melbourne, and became a pioneer boat between Melbourne and New Zealand. She transported the first four hives of Ligurian honeybees (Apis mellifera ligustica) to Australia, which were ordered from the company George Neighbour and Sons by the president of the Acclimatisation Society of Victoria, Edward Wilson at the 1862 International Exhibition. This successful introduction completed the species' cosmpolitan distribution.

In April 1868, en route to New Zealand, one of the Alhambra's engines broke down, and she was compelled to return to port to have the broken cylinder replaced; Langland’s Foundry Company took only five weeks to cast the new 4-ton cylinder. In mid-January 1869, she was passing Kent Group when her screw shaft broke, and despite the difficult conditions, the captain succeeded in making land near Cape Howe. From there, she was taken in tow by the Dandenong, but was once again placed in danger when the towline parted while the ships were coming through The Rip. The Alhambra cleared the reef inside of Shortland Bluff, and with the weather becoming hazy, she anchored off the Swanspit light. At 6am, she was again taken in tow by the Dandenong, and conveyed to Williamstown.

In 1882, the Alhambra was sold to Nipper & See, of Sydney. In 1883, it was purchased by Samuel Marsden of Blayney, who had recently acquired a large plot of land in Kimberley and intended to use the steamer to deliver a shipment of sheep. However, the shipment was not fulfilled, and Marsden was forced to sell the Alhambra at a considerable loss.

On 19 May 1885, the Alhambra collided with the Newcastle lightship, carrying away the moorings. The outward bound steamer Balmain then ran into the Alhambra, smashing her stanchions and main rails, and doing other damage. The Alhambra was floated off safely, and the Balmain, despite losing her deckhouse, continued on to her destination.

On 7 July 1885, an 82-year-old seaman named Henry Johnson was thrown over the wheel of the Alhambra during a storm, suffering spinal injuries and paralysis of the lower extremities. On 7 December 1886, a labourer named John Van Rampan fell down the hold of the ship Alhambra, a depth of about 10 feet (3.05 m). He was admitted to the Sydney Hospital suffering from back injuries and shock.

== Loss ==
In June 1888, the Sydney Marine Board warned of a derelict about eleven miles northeast of Newcastle that posed a potential shipping hazard. The captain of the Alhambra, Summerbell, was contracted to remove the derelict, and expected it to be done within forty-eight hours. A week later, the Alhambra had moved one of the anchors of the derelict vessel, but had not yet raised it, and the hulk remained in the same position.

On the morning of 30 June, the Alhambra was lying at anchor close to the derelict, accompanied by the Tasmania, which had gone out to assist in towing the derelict ashore. An account of the subsequent events was given in The Brisbane Courier:

A steel rope was fixed from the stern of the Alhambra to the chains of the derelict, and it was proposed to send a diver down in order to lash the chain to the cable. The diver, however, found that he could not work from the north-eastern side of the derelict, on which the Alhambra was lying, and the captain decided to shift around to get the bow of his vessel to westward of the derelict. Arrangements were completed shortly before 4 o'clock in the afternoon, and the steamer was just about bringing up to the desired position when she fouled the derelict about amidships. An attempt was made to alter the course of the steamer, but it was found that she had a huge hole knocked in her side. All attempts to stop the leak proved unavailing, and as the steamer was rapidly settling down, the crew took to the boats and reached the steamer Tasmania safely.

The Alhambra sank a few minutes later. She was owned by A. Wheeler of Sydney at the time of her sinking, and was insured in the South British Company of New Zealand for £6000. She was valued at £10,000.
