= Florea =

Florea is both a Romanian surname and a masculine Romanian given name. Notable people with the name include:

Surname:

- Daniel Florea, Romanian footballer
- Daniel Florea, Romanian politician
- Daniel Constantin Florea, Romanian footballer
- Dick Florea, American television personality
- John Florea, American photographer
- Laurenţiu Florea, Romanian footballer
- Nikolay Florea (1912–1941), Ukrainian Soviet astronomer
- Răzvan Florea, Romanian swimmer
- Sandu Florea, Romanian and American comic book artist

Given name:

- Florea Dudiță (1934–2025), Romanian academic, politician, and diplomat
- Florea Dumitrache (1948–2007), Romanian footballer
- Florea Voinea (born 1941), Romanian footballer
- Florea Rîmaru (1919–1972), Romanian serial killer and father of Ion Rîmaru.

Other uses

- Florea (millipede), a genus of crested millipedes in the family Tynommatidae.

== See also ==
- Florescu (surname)
- Florești (disambiguation)
- Apis florea, an Asian species of wild honeybees
