= Gârbești =

Gârbești may refer to several villages in Romania:

- Gârbești, a village in Todireni Commune, Botoșani County
- Gârbești, a village in Țibana Commune, Iași County
