= List of shipwrecks in June 1888 =

The list of shipwrecks in June 1888 includes ships sunk, foundered, grounded, or otherwise lost during June 1888.

== 1 June ==
List of shipwrecks: 1 June 1888
Ship	State	Description
Jersey	United Kingdom	The steamship was driven ashore 2 nautical miles (3.7 km) south of the Phanar Lighthouse, Ottoman Empire.
Maggie	United Kingdom	The Thames barge was run into by the brigantine Dagmar (Denmark) and sank in the English Channel 4 nautical miles (7.4 km) off Folkestone, Kent. Her crew survived. Maggie was on a voyage from London to Shoreham-by-Sea, Sussex.

== 2 June ==
List of shipwrecks: 2 June 1888
Ship	State	Description
Ninea	Flag unknown	The schooner foundered in the North Sea. Her five crew were rescued on 4 June by Thomas and Mary (United Kingdom). Ninea was on a voyage from Mömsteräs, Sweden to Sunderland, County Durham, United Kingdom.

== 4 June ==
List of shipwrecks: 4 June 1888
Ship	State	Description
Cromartyshire	United Kingdom	The ship was driven ashore near Hooghly Point, India. She was on a voyage from Colombo, Ceylon to Calcutta, India. She was refloated with assistance.
Élan	French Navy	The despatch boat foundered off Dunkirk, Nord. Her crew survived.
H. W. Crawford	United States	The ship was beached during a storm three miles (4.8 km) west of the West Pass of St. Andrew's Bar.
Unnamed	Flag unknown	The ship foundered 13 nautical miles (24 km) south of Cape Agulhas, Cape Colony with the loss of all on board. Witnessed by Drummond Castle (United Kingdom). She may have been Trevelyan (United Kingdom), on a voyage from the Clyde to Otago, New Zealand.

== 5 June ==
List of shipwrecks: 5 June 1888
Ship	State	Description
Lovie	United Kingdom	The fishing dandy foundered between the Eddystone Rocks and Rame Head, Cornwall with the loss of three of the four people on board. The survivor was rescued by the fishing dandy Mary Jane (United Kingdom).

== 6 June ==
List of shipwrecks: 6 June 1888
Ship	State	Description
Ashdale	United Kingdom	The steamship ran aground in the Clyde at Garvel, Ayrshire. She was later refloated and resumed her voyage.
Sir Bevis	United Kingdom	The steamship collided with another vessel off the Royal Sovereign Lightship ( Trinity House) and was severely damaged. She was on a voyage from Bilbao, Spain to the River Tyne. She completed her voyage.

== 7 June ==
List of shipwrecks: 7 June 1888
Ship	State	Description
Gleam	United States	The yacht was sunk in a collision with the steamship Joppa (United States) in Chesapeake Bay near Seven Foot Knoll Light (39°09′26″N 76°24′12″W), in the mouth of the Patapsco River with the loss of one life.
Janet Douglas	United Kingdom	The schooner ran aground on the Nigg Sands, off the coast of Cromartyshire.
Onward	United Kingdom	The schooner struck a rock off Cape Clear Island, County Cork and was wrecked. Her four crew were rescued. She was on a voyage from Newport, Monmouthshire to Dingle, County Kerry.
Raffaele Ligure	Italy	The ship ran aground on the Longsand, in the North Sea off the coast of Essex, United Kingdom and was wrecked. Her crew were rescued by the smack Increase (United Kingdom).

== 8 June ==
List of shipwrecks: 8 June 1888
Ship	State	Description
Prussia	United Kingdom	The steamship ran aground in the Clyde near Dumbarton.

== 9 June ==
List of shipwrecks: 9 June 1888
Ship	State	Description
Libra	United Kingdom	The steamship collided with the steamship Falcon (United Kingdom) in the River Thames at Wapping, Middlesex and was severely damaged.
Perseverance	United Kingdom	The fishing trawler was driven ashore in Dublin Bay.

== 10 June ==
List of shipwrecks: 10 June 1888
Ship	State	Description
Unnamed	Flag unknown	The steamship was driven ashore on Amack, Denmark.

== 12 June ==
List of shipwrecks: 12 June 1888
Ship	State	Description
Cumeria	United Kingdom	The ship was sighted in the South Atlantic whilst on a voyage from the River Tyne to Valparaíso, Chile. No further trace, reported missing.

== 14 June ==
List of shipwrecks: 14 June 1888
Ship	State	Description
Niobe	United Kingdom	The ship ran aground in the Bangka Strait 30 nautical miles (56 km) south of Muntok, Netherlands East Indies. She was on a voyage from Greenock, Renfrewshire to Singapore, Straits Settlements.
Pony	United States	The steamship capsized and sank during a turn on the Muskegon Lake. Her engineer drowned.

== 15 June ==
List of shipwrecks: 15 June 1888
Ship	State	Description
Drumlanrig	United Kingdom	The ship ran aground in the Humber. She was on a voyage from Hull, Yorkshire to San Francisco, California, United States. She was refloated and put back to Hull.

== 16 June ==
List of shipwrecks: 16 June 1888
Ship	State	Description
Princess of Wales	United Kingdom	The paddle steamer was run into by the steamship Balmoral Castle (United Kingdom) and sank off Skelmorlie, Ayrshire with the loss of three lives.

== 18 June ==
List of shipwrecks: 18 June 1888
Ship	State	Description
Guglielmo	Austria-Hungary	The barque caught fire at Cape Town, Cape Colony. She was scuttled.

== 19 June ==
List of shipwrecks: 19 June 1888
Ship	State	Description
Zadok	United Kingdom	The ship was sighted in the Indian Ocean whilst on a voyage from the Spencer Gulf to Falmouth, Cornwall. No further trace, reported overdue.

== 20 June ==
List of shipwrecks: 20 June 1888
Ship	State	Description
Pioneer	United Kingdom	The brig was driven ashore and wrecked at Beachy Head, Sussex. Her eight crew survived. She was on a voyage from Newcastle upon Tyne, Northumberland to Shoreham-by-Sea, Sussex.
Prima Donna	United Kingdom	The fishing lugger was run into by the steamship Blonde (United Kingdom) and was abandoned. Her crew subsequently reboarded her and she was taken in to Lowestoft, Suffolk in a severely leaky condition.

== 23 June ==
List of shipwrecks: 23 June 1888
Ship	State	Description
Ægean, and Northampton	United Kingdom; Germany	The steamship Ægean and the full-rigged ship Northampton collided off the Longships, Cornwall and both vessels sank. Northampton lost two of her crew. Survivors were rescued by the schooner Grace Darling (United Kingdom). Ægean was on a voyage from Bilbao, Spain to Glasgow, Renfrewshire.
Olivette	United States	The pleasure launch struck a dike in Newark Bay and capsized with the loss of six lives.

== 24 June ==
List of shipwrecks: 24 June 1888
Ship	State	Description
Werra	Germany	The steamship was driven ashore at Dungeness, Kent, United Kingdom. She was refloated the next day and taken in to Southampton, Hampshire, United Kingdom.

== 27 June ==
List of shipwrecks: 27 June 1888
Ship	State	Description
Dunvegan Castle	United Kingdom	The steamship ran aground at Corsewall Point, Wigtownshire. She was refloated and taken in to Loch Ryan in a leaky condition.
Minerva	United Kingdom	The steamship ran aground off Sanda Island. She was on a voyage from Glasgow, Renfrewshire to Danzig, Germany. She was later refloated and put back to Glasgow for repairs.
Unnamed	United States	The pleasure launch was sunk in a collision with the steamship James W. Baldwin (United States) one mile (1.6 km) above Newburg, New York with the loss of two of the eight people on board.

== 29 June ==
List of shipwrecks: 29 June 1888
Ship	State	Description
Sensation	United Kingdom	The tug was run into by the tug Victoria (United Kingdom) 3 nautical miles (5.6 km) off Sunderland, County Durham. Sensation was beached at Sunderland.

== 30 June ==
List of shipwrecks: 30 June 1888
Ship	State	Description
Alhambra	New South Wales	The steamship collided with the derelict steamship John T. Berry (United States), which she was trying to salvage, and sank off Newcastle, New South Wales. The steamship Tasmania (United Kingdom) rescued her crew. The steamship Thetis (United Kingdom) later sank John T. Berry as a danger to navigation.

== Unknown date ==
List of shipwrecks: Unknown date in June 1888
Ship	State	Description
Abo	Russia	The steamship was driven ashore on Seskar. Her passengers were taken off by the steamshihp Boy (United Kingdom).
Active	United Kingdom	The Thames barge collided with another vessel and sank in the English Channel off Beachy Head, Sussex. Her seven crew were rescued. She was on a voyage from Deptford, Kent to Plymouth, Devon.
Anna	Norway	The barque ran aground and was wrecked at Vardø. She was on a voyage from Liverpool, Lancashire, United Kingdom to Vardø.
Auckland	United Kingdom	The steamship was driven ashore and sank at "Bronosound", south of Bodø, Norway.
Aurora	Russia	The schooner ran aground on the Middlegrunden, in the Baltic Sea. She was on a voyage from Riga to La Rochelle, Charente-Inférieure, France. She was refloated with assistance.
Berbice	Flag unknown	The ship was driven ashore at Newcastle, New South Wales. She was a total loss.
Celestina Rocca	Italy	The brigantine was driven ashore and wrecked at "Bancochico", Argentina. She was on a voyage from Gualeguaychú, Argentina to the English Channel.
Chattanooga	United States	The ship was wrecked at Boston, Massachusetts.
Chrysolite	Norway	The barque was driven ashore on Caribou Island, Canada. Her crew were rescued. She was on a voyage from Marseille, Bouches-du-Rhône, France to Quebec City, Canada.
Coban	Canada Canada	The ship was driven ashore on Green Island. She was on a voyage from Sydney, Nova Scotia to Montreal, Quebec.
Como	United Kingdom	The steamship collided with the steamship Caloric (United Kingdom) and sank in the Boca Channel, off Buenos Aires, Argentina.
Confidence	United Kingdom	The steamship ran aground and sank at Cullivoe, Yell, Shetland Islands.
Daphne	France	The barque was driven ashore at Pará, Brazil. She subsequently broke up.
Einar	Norway	The barque was driven ashore in the Rio Grande do Norte. She was a total loss. She was on a voyage from Macau to Rio de Janeiro, Brazil.
Ellida	Norway	The barque was wrecked at Danger Point, Cape Colony.
Emma	Norway	The barque was driven ashore and wrecked at Grahamstown, Cape Colony with some loss of life.
Emma	United Kingdom	The ship was destroyed by fire at Hedon, Yorkshire.
Emma	Germany	The schooner was driven ashore and wrecked at Mahanoro, Madagascar. Her crew were rescued.
Emily	United Kingdom	The schooner collided with the steamship Manitoba (United Kingdom) and sank at Antwerp, Belgium. Emily was on a voyage from Teignmouth, Devon to Antwerp.
Essex	United Kingdom	The steamship put in to Aden, Aden Governorate on fire. She was on a voyage from Sydney, New South Wales to London.
Freischutz	Germany	The brig was abandoned in the North Sea 7 nautical miles (13 km) south west of Lindesnes, Norway. Her crew were rescued by the brig Sylfide (Norway).
George	Russia	The schooner ran aground on the Gunfleet Sand, in the North Sea off the coast of Essex, United Kingdom. She was refloated on 6 June and taken in to Rochester, Kent, United Kingdom in a severely leaky condition.
Guglielmo D.	Austria-Hungary	The barque caught fire at Cape Town, Cape Colony. She was scuttled.
Ino	United Kingdom	The ketch foundered in the North Sea off Mundesley, Norfolk. Her crew survived.
Joseph Nicholson	United Kingdom	The schooner ran aground on the Leman Sands, in the North Sea. She was on a voyage from Fredrikstad, Norway to London. She was refloated and assisted in to Great Yarmouth, Norfolk in a leaky condition.
Lancaster Castle	United Kingdom	The full-rigged ship was driven ashore at Victoria, British Columbia, Canada. She was on a voyage from Nanaimo, British Columbia to San Francisco, California, United States.
Manitoba	United Kingdom	The barque was driven ashore and damaged at Brunswick, Georgia, United States. She was refloated and taken in to Savannah, Georgia.
Mary Ellen	United Kingdom	The schooner sprang a leak off the Flannan Isles. She put in to the Bay of Kilda, where she foundered. Her crew survived. She was on a voyage from Liverpool, Lancashire to Reykjavík, Iceland.
Murga	Spain	The barque collided with the steamship Camma (United Kingdom) and was severely damaged. She was towed in to Málaga.
Norseman	United Kingdom	The barque was destroyed by fire in the Atlantic Ocean. Her crew took to the boats; they were rescued by the full-rigged ship Ardencraig (United Kingdom).
Sotera	United Kingdom	The barque was abandoned at sea. Her fourteen crew were rescued by the barque Rewa (United Kingdom). Sotera was on a voyage from Cochin, India to New York.
St. Fillans	United Kingdom	The ship was driven ashore at Saugor, India. She was refloated.
Teno	Chile	The hulk sprang a leak and was beached at Valparaíso.
Vaides	flag unknown	The steamship was lost off Ouessant, Finistère, France.
Waarbud	Norway	The brigantine was driven ashore at Macau, Brazil. She was on a voyage from Macau to Rio de Janeiro.
Warren	United Kingdom	The schooner was abandoned in the Atlantic Ocean before 11 June.
Unnamed	Flag unknown	The schooner was wrecked by an onboard explosion 45 nautical miles (83 km) south east of the Delaware Capes, United States.
