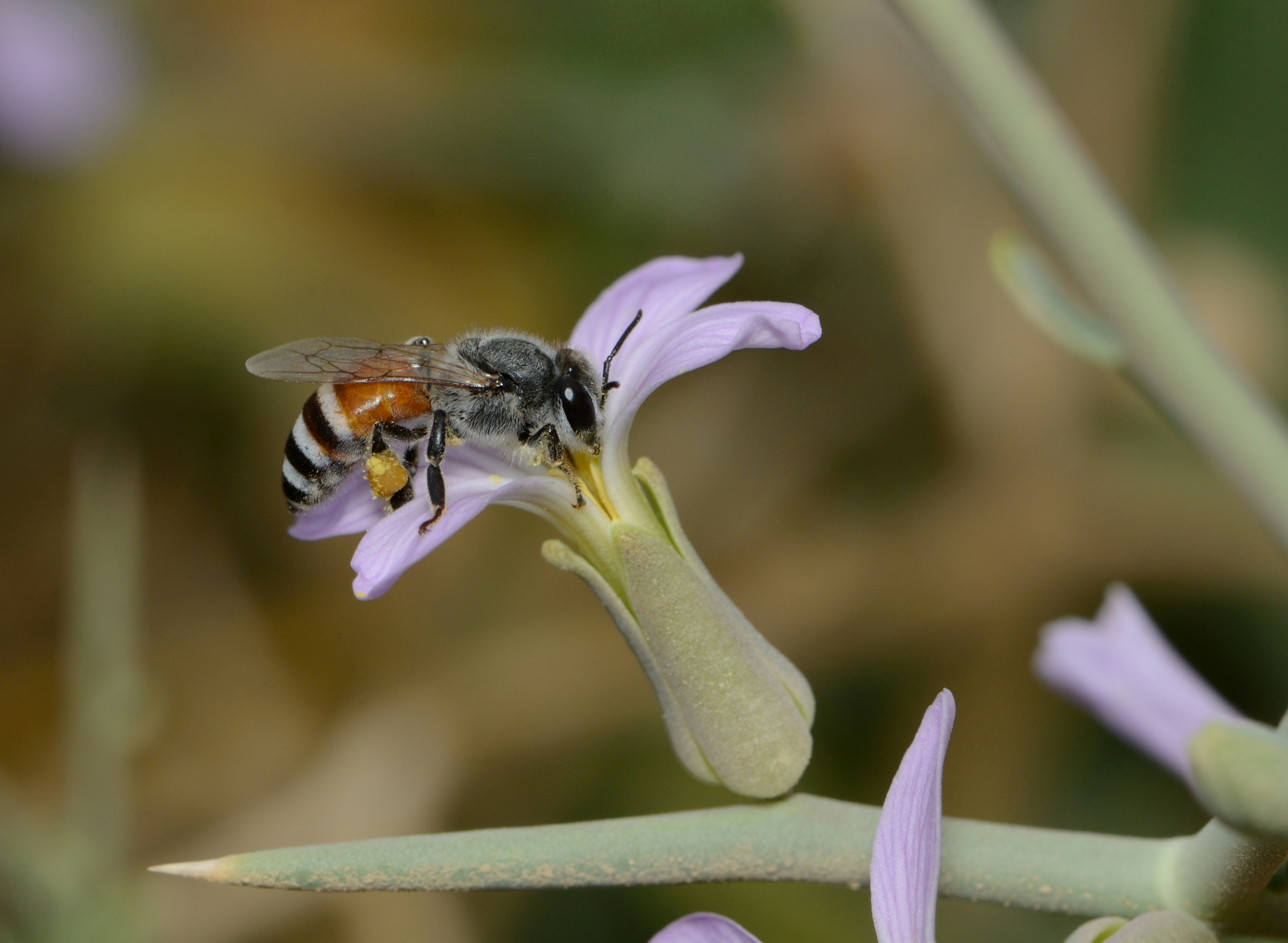
- Worker

Scientific classification
- Kingdom: Animalia
- Phylum: Arthropoda
- Clade: Pancrustacea
- Class: Insecta
- Order: Hymenoptera
- Family: Apidae
- Genus: Apis
- Subgenus: Micrapis
- Species: A. florea

Binomial name
- Apis florea Fabricius, 1787
- Range of Apis florea

= Apis florea =

Species of bee

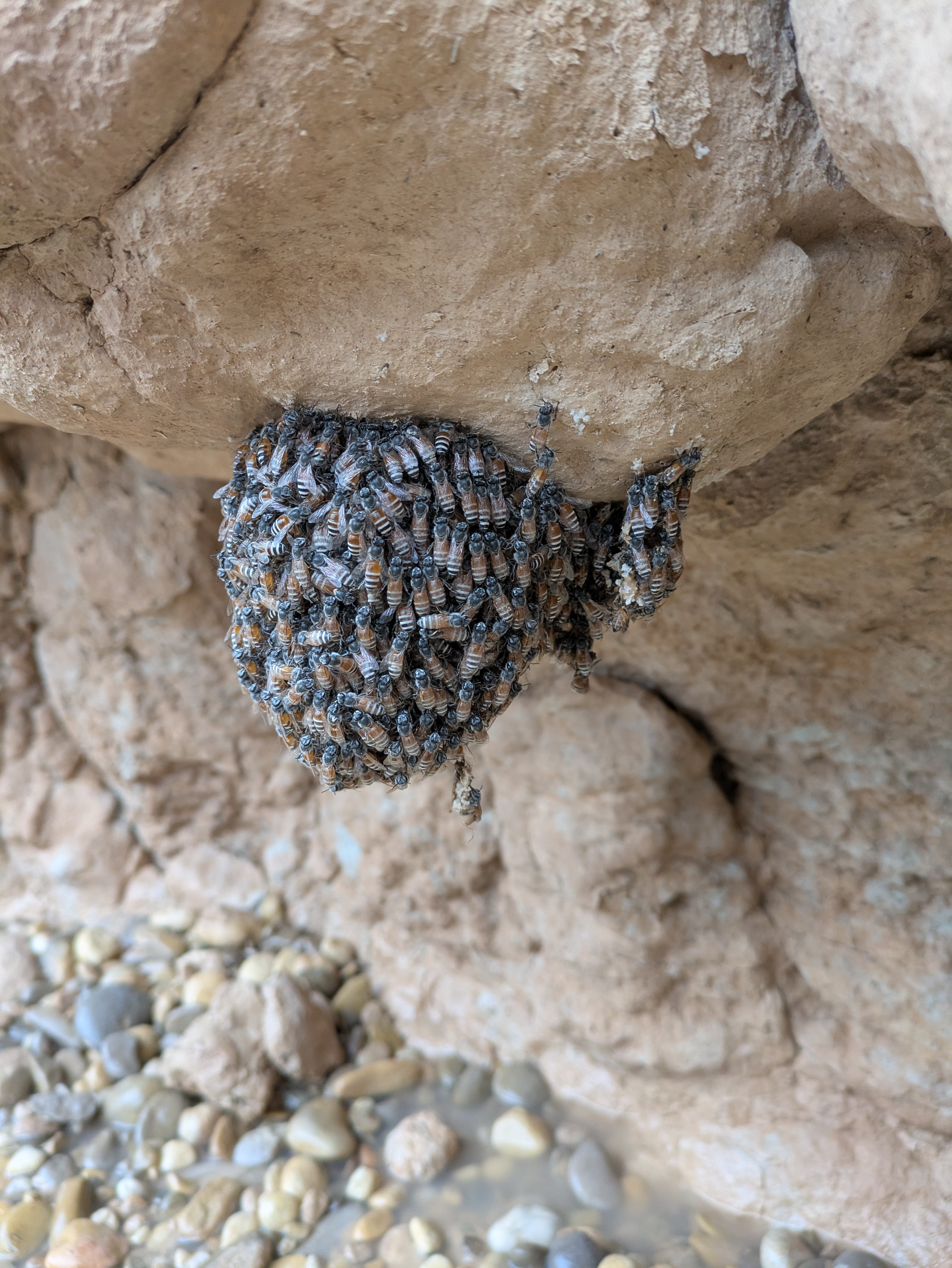
Dwarf honey bees in Behbahan

The dwarf honey bee (or red dwarf honey bee), Apis florea, is one of two species of small, wild honey bees of southern and southeastern Asia. It has a much wider distribution than its sister species, Apis andreniformis. First identified in the late 18th century, Apis florea is unique for its morphology, foraging behavior and defensive mechanisms like making a piping noise. Apis florea have open nests and small colonies, which makes them more susceptible to predation than cavity nesters with large numbers of defensive workers. The species is an important pollinator in many parts of its range and its nests are occasionally exploited as a source of wild honey.

== Taxonomy and phylogeny ==
Danish zoologist Johan Christian Fabricius first identified Apis florea in 1787. A. florea is a member of the Apis genus. The name Florea is a personal name of Romanian origin.

A. florea and its sister species A. andreniformis together form the subclade Micrapis and are the most basal extant species of honey bees, diverging before the two other extant honey bee clades, Megapis (the giant honey bees) and Apis (the eastern and western honey bees and their close relatives). The timing of the Micrapis species' divergence from the other extant honey bee species is not known with certainty due to the difficulty in calibrating molecular phylogenies with the fossil record for the Apis genus.

== Description and identification ==
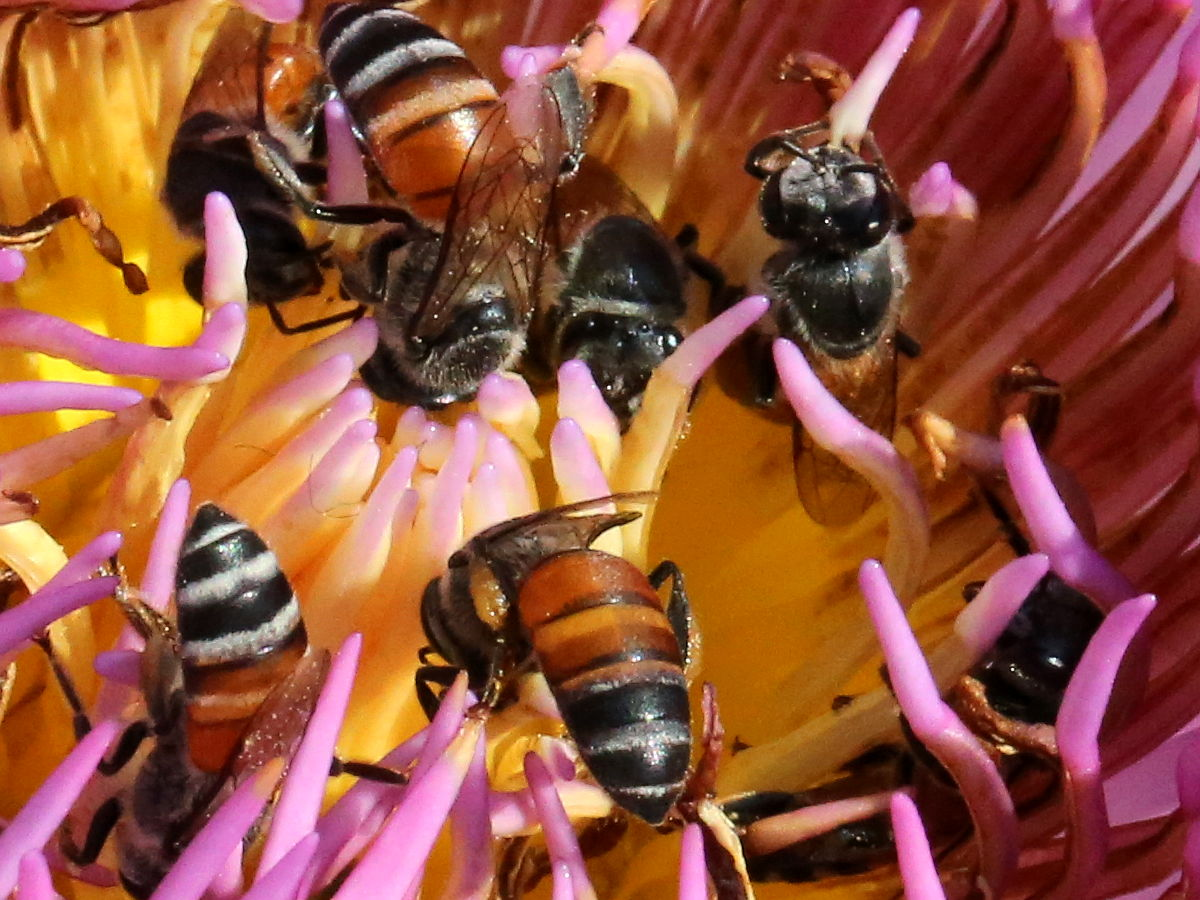
Pollinating a lotus flower. Wat Phra Kaew, Thailand

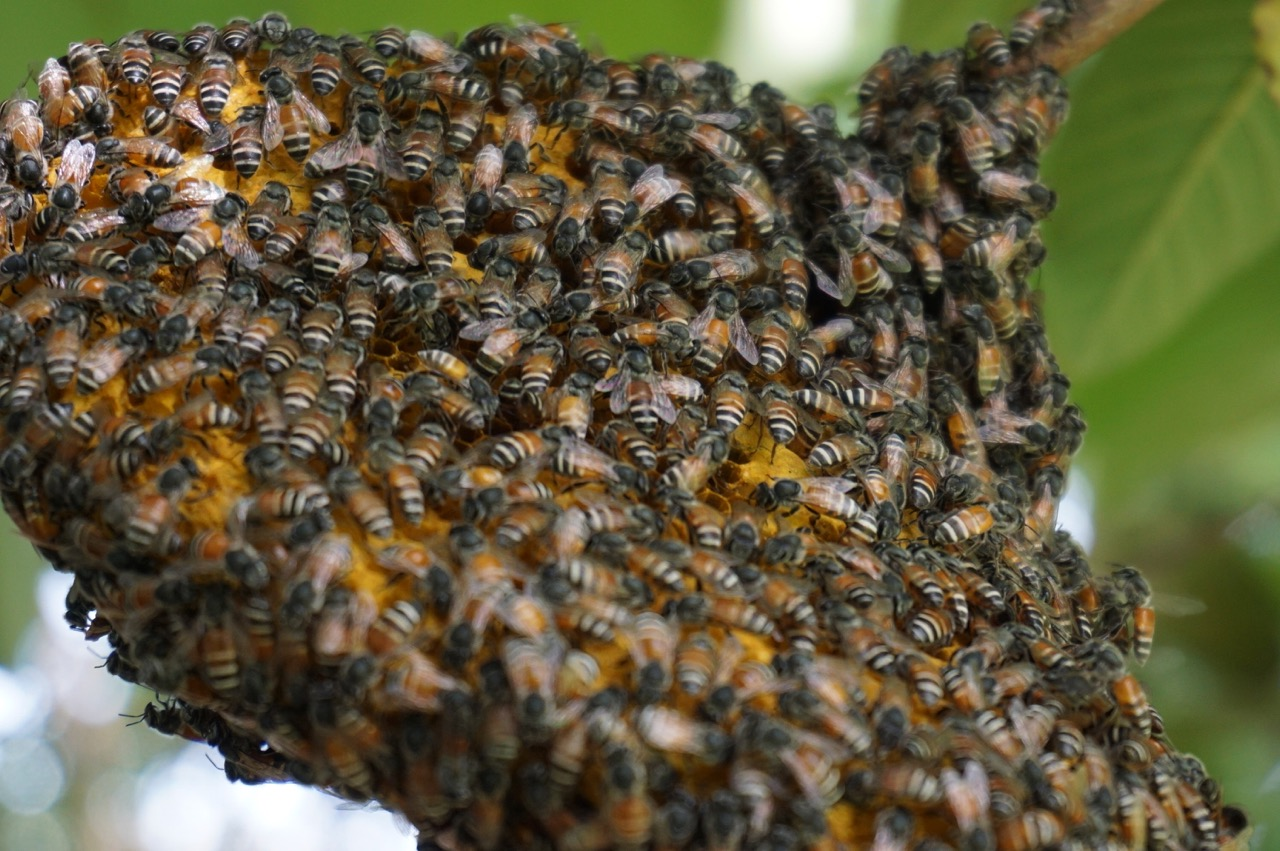
Apis florea nest on a tree branch in Vietnam

A. florea is called the dwarf honey bee due to its small size compared to other honeybees. A worker is typically 7–10 mm in body length and its overall coloration is red-brown. A colony builds a single, exposed comb usually on tree branches or shrubs. A. florea produce honey that is harvested and eaten in parts of its range. They are excellent pollinators, which gives them an important ecological role in the places they inhabit. Drones carry a thumb-like bifurcation called the basitarsus, which is located two-thirds along the length of the tibia. The fimbriate lobe of A. florea has three protrusions and they sting using two stylet barbs.

Apis florea and its sister species together comprise the subgenus Micrapis, and are the most primitive of the living species of Apis, reflected in their small colony size, and simple nest construction. The exposed single combs are built on branches of shrubs and small trees. The forager bees do not perform a gravity-oriented waggle dance on the vertical face of the comb to recruit nestmates as in the domesticated Apis mellifera and other species. Instead, they perform the dance on the horizontal upper surface where the comb wraps around the supporting branch. The dance is a straight run pointing directly to the source of pollen or nectar the forager has been visiting. The distinctiveness of the two species A. florea and A. andreniformis was established unequivocally in the 1990s. A. florea is redder and old workers always have a red first abdomen (younger workers are paler in colour, as is the case in giant honey bees); A. andreniformis is generally darker and the first abdomen segment is completely black in old bees. Distinguishing characteristics of the dwarf honey bees are outlined below:

Characteristic	A. florea	A. andreniformis
Workers
Body length (mm)	7-10	8-9
Overall coloration	Red-brown	Black
Proboscis length (mm)	3.11-3.37	2.797-2.798
Forewing length (mm)	6.17-6.74	6.43-6.49
Forewing width (mm)	2.12-2.32	2.17-2.21
Hindwing length (mm)	3.17-4.83	3.22-3.23
Hindwing width (mm)	1.36±0.04	1.25-1.28
Comb dimensions
Vertical length (from support bottom) (cm)	12.0±3	10.0±3.3
Horizontal width (cm)	16.9±5.3	12.2±3.6
Branch diameter (cm)	0.8±0.07	1.7±1.7
Worker cell dimensions
Depth of cell (cm)	0.93±0.07	0.76±0.02
Width of 10 cells (cm)	2.98±0.15	2.78±0.23
Drone cell dimensions
Depth of cell (cm)	1.33±0.07	1.45±0.71
Width of 10 cells (cm)	4.88±0.21	4.18±0.24
Queen cell dimensions
Depth of cell (cm)	1.41±0.15	1.24±0.26
Internal diameter of cell (cm)	0.47±0.09	0.54±0.08

== Distribution and habitat ==
A. florea spans the continents of Asia and Africa and is most commonly seen in Southeastern Asia (Thailand), the Northeastern part of India, China, and forested regions of the Middle East. A. florea reach a decision about a new nesting site via dancing. They decide on a site when the largest number of individuals dance in the direction of the new site. The workers use an auditory signal of piping to indicate a decision about a new site has been reached, with the top of the swarm lifting off into the air first, followed by the bottom of the swarm and then the middle reaching the air last, but all within one minute of the swarm’s initial lift off. Since dancing is a common mechanism of communicating about a new nesting site in both A. florea and A. mellifera, it is suggested that this form of nest site selection evolved in the common ancestor of Apis. However, A. florea do not re-evaluate a site before several individuals move to the new site like A. mellifera does. Instead, swarms travel to the new site as a group and leave to a new site if it is later discovered to be unsuitable. This makes searching for new sites a much faster process for A. florea, but not necessarily more accurate.

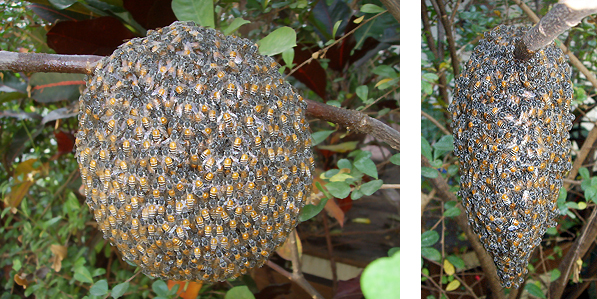
Apis florea nest, Thailand. The nest is 20 cm in diameter and contains approximately 3600 cells on each side. The reflective substance on the branch either side of the nest is propolis which acts as a sticky and chemically repellent barrier to protect the nest from ants, particularly weaver ants (Oecophylla smaragdina). The curtain of bees covering the comb is 3–4 bees thick (~10 mm).

Apis florea are found in southeastern Asian countries, especially in Thailand, Iran, Oman, United Arab Emirates, India, Myanmar, and some parts of China, Cambodia, and Vietnam. Since 1985 Apis florea is also found in Sudan. They live in forest habitats but they are also pollinators of tropical fruit crops in Thailand. Apis florea build exposed nests always with a single comb on a single branch. If they are building a new nest near to the old one, they salvage the wax from the old nest. Other species of honeybee do not exhibit this behavior, perhaps because of the risk of contaminating pathogens. Even within the species this behavior differs, the colonies that migrate less than 200 meters engage in wax recycling, but the colonies that migrate longer distances do not.

In 2024, a fully established colony of Apis florea was recorded for the first ever time in Europe in Malta.

== Colony cycle ==
The annual colony cycle of honeybees involves migration, swarming, and absconding. A. florea migrate seasonally from one habitat to another. This might increase colony fitness, as the honeybees search for new territories, resources, or a reduction in parasites. Once a colony has outgrown its hive space, it will reproduce via swarming. During warmer seasons like spring and summer, ambient temperatures allow honeybees to forage actively, and they will reproduce frequently. During the colder seasons of autumn and winter, colonies diminish in size because they depend on food stores. Before swarming, the colony will build queen cells in order for virgin queens to rear young queens. Before the new queens emerge, the colony’s workers search for a new nesting site. Afterwards, the bees will choose who stays and who goes. Similar to absconding behavior, the old queen will swarm while the new queens prepare for emergence.

== Breeding and lifespan ==
In a single patriline, more workers mean the colony will produce more drones. High mating frequency in A. florea has been evolutionarily selected for as observed in other members of the genus. The average lifespan of a drone is 15.6 days, ranging from 6–41 days. The queen has a much longer lifespan consistent with the longevity of the colony. A. florea have workers that police to ensure that workers’ eggs are destroyed at twice the rate of queens’ eggs using oophagy. The queens’ eggs are marked as to avoid destruction by worker bees. Since this behavior is also observed in A. mellifera, this suggests that policing mechanism behaviors evolved before the divergence of the genus Apis.

== Diet ==
A. florea adults eat primarily honey and nectar but also feed the brood on pollen. Future queens are fed royal jelly and are reared in larger cells so they become larger.

== Foraging ==
A. florea adopt the open-comb branch site as an information center for foraging. The branch platforms serves as a location for bee dancing that conveys important foraging information to other bees. They are commonly seen foraging near branches and small bushes. They mainly forage for pollen and nectar as food sources as well as water and safety from predators. Their frequent foraging and long migration range displays their high degree of mobility. They tend to build combs at lower elevations, away from direct sunlight and on the peripheral side of plant branches. A. florea forage openly, unlike A. cerana that mostly forage in parts of the hive that are not visible. Dialect observed in A. florea does not correlate with foraging range. A. florea tend to have longer foraging durations when compared to other bees in this genus, perhaps because they require smaller territories at lower altitudes and build open-combs on branches or twigs. Their small size necessitates more time to forage for pollen or nectar because they have a limit on how much food they can carry. Therefore, it is worth the cost of foraging for a longer duration if it means gaining the benefit of a highly nutritious food source.

== Competition ==
A. florea demonstrate aggressive behaviors when competing for territory. Additionally, they compensate for their small size and limited flight range with more aggressive behavior since their flight range is also limited. This suggests that aggressive behavior is naturally selected for in A. florea because it facilitates defending flowers in a smaller territory.

== Mating systems ==
When a queen mates, the sperm is transferred into the spermatheca directly. Specifically, A. florea females produce no mucus as a sign of mating, unlike A. mellifera queens. A. florea males use a clasper organ at the hindleg to hold the queen’s leg during mating. Anatomical studies support the hypothesis that A. florea mate via direct sperm transfer. A. florea queens typically mate with 3-4 males. A. florea mate with fewer drones than A. mellifera. A. mellifera queens mate with as many as 25 drones and simply deposit spermatozoa in the oviducts of the queen, where only 10% of spermatozoa reach the spermatheca. Thus, A. florea use the more energetically efficient method of sperm transfer.

== Defense ==
A. florea show highly specific social defense mechanisms when they sense predators nearby. For instance, they typically display hissing and shimmering behavior, in addition to nesting amidst dense foliage to camouflage themselves from potential predators. A more poignant example is the specific behavioral response they exhibit against their predominant predator, the O. smaragdina weaver ant. When these ants are in close proximity, the bees produce and deposit sticky barriers to obstruct their path. The guard bees take cover at this sticky zone and start to alert other bees using specific hissing sounds with the goal of preventing full blown raids by the ants. Over time, more bees are recruited to contribute to this sticky zone barrier which reinforces their defense.

=== Piping ===
Defending a large social honey bee colony containing several thousands of workers requires simultaneous action of many individuals, which ideally involved communication between workers, enabling coordinated action and a fast response. Apis florea employ a defensive strategy called "piping", in which one individual emits an initial warning signal ("piping"), which is followed 0.3-0.7 seconds later by a general response from a large number of bees ("hissing"). With a fundamental frequency of 384±31 Hz that lasts 0.82±0.35 seconds, piping is audible to the human ear. Hissing is a noisy, broad band signal that is also audible to the human ear and produced by slight movements of the bees' wings. Individuals close to the piping bee are the first to hiss, which spreads rapidly to neighbors until an impressive coordinated crescendo is produced by the entire colony. Piping and hissing are accompanied by workers ceasing activity such as foraging dancing and departures from the colony.

== Communication ==
As social bees, A. florea require a mechanism of communication, especially when conveying important spatial information about foraging, including direction and distance. The time elapsed during the waggle phase when a dancer moves forward while shaking the abdomen from side to side indicates the distance to a site. The longer the waggle phase, the longer the distance to a site and vice versa. In order to indicate direction, A. florea workers orient the waggle phase in the direction of the site, while dancing on the crow of the nest or swarm. The precision of dance does not depend on the type of site i.e. nest sites or food patches. In other words, A. florea do not change the precision of the waggle dance to indicate a goal is a nest site or food patch, unlike A. mellifera, which do change precision when conveying information about food patches specifically. This suggests that A. florea do not prioritize nesting site nor food patch information by changing the precision of dance.

== Genetic diversity ==
Even in a single nest there is high genetic diversity among the Apis florea bees. Since honey bee queens are polygamous, strong genetic variability exists. The tendency of this species to perform certain tasks is dependent on this variation. For example, fanning of the nest is done by specific set of workers, when the nest reaches a specific temperature threshold.

=== Division of labor ===
Apis florea's younger individuals work within the nests performing maintenance while older individuals are responsible for protection and foraging. Some specific tasks like fanning of the comb to maintain a stable temperature are done by a specific set of workers, which is genetically motivated. This is completed by patrilines because diverse patrilines respond to a specific temperature threshold. When a queen mates with multiple unrelated males, genotypically diverse workers emerge in the colony. These colonies may be more fit than genetically uniform colonies perhaps because they are able to tolerate a wider range of environmental conditions. In such cases, A. florea may use genetically based task specialization, in which highly related daughters of a haploid male have genetic predispositions to undertake certain tasks. This could explain why polyandry has evolved and been maintained.

== Ecology ==
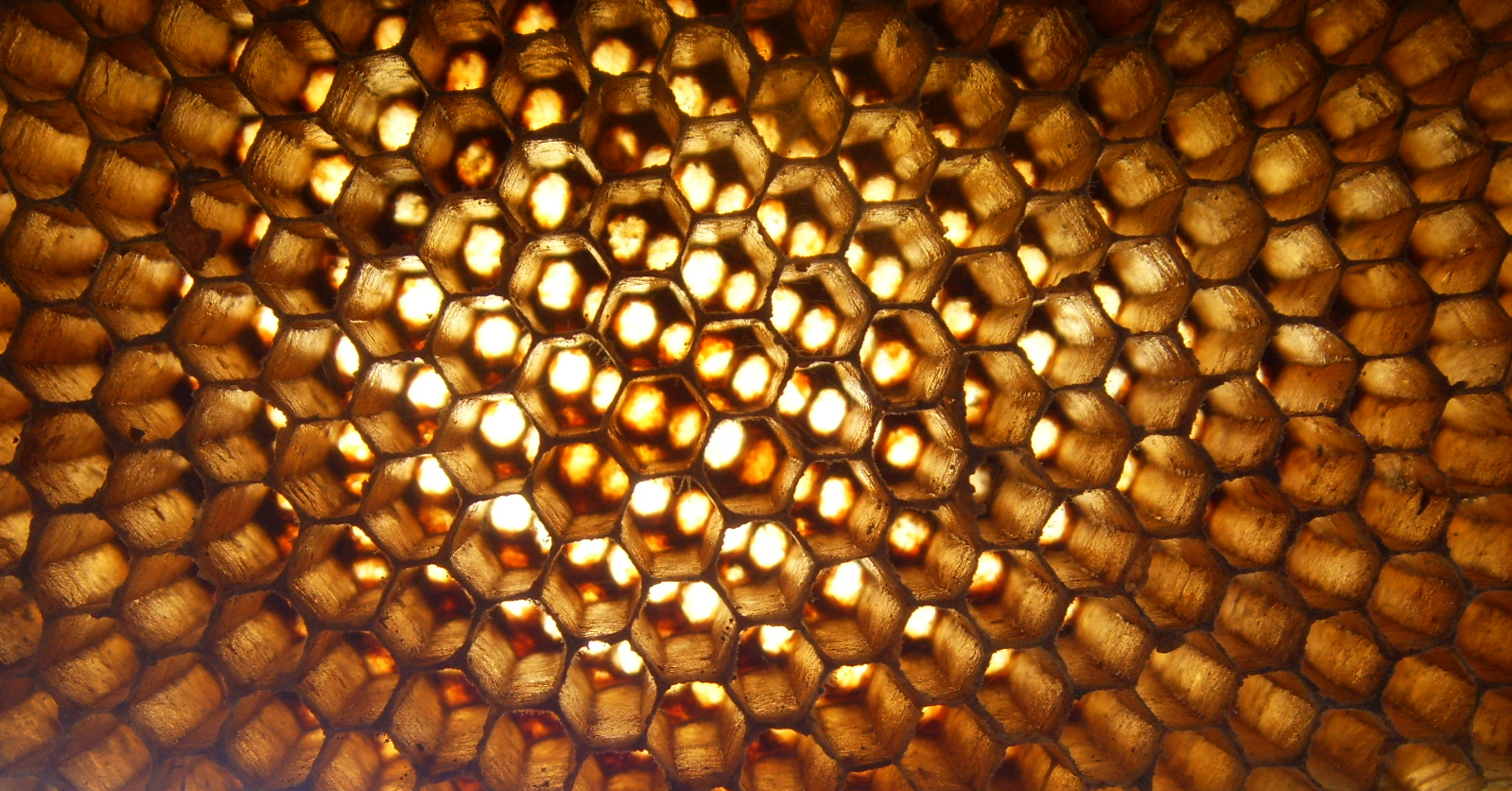
Close-up of an abandoned A. florea nest, Thailand: The hexagonal wax cells on either side of the nest are slightly offset from each other. This increases the strength of the comb and reduces the amount of wax required to produce a robust structure.

Aside from their small size, simple exposed nests and simplified dance language, the lifecycle and behavior of this species is fairly similar to other species of Apis. Workers of A. florea, like those of the species A. mellifera, also engage in worker policing, a process where nonqueen eggs are removed from the hive. Queenless A. florea colonies have been observed to merge with nearby queen-right A. florea colonies, suggesting workers are attracted to queen bee pheromones.

=== Worker policing ===
In the presence of a multiply mated queen, eggs laid by workers are removed in a process called worker policing. Worker policing is thus a result of genetic conflicts of interest among workers used non-exclusively by honeybees and wasps. With worker policing, workers control the production of males by other workers in favor of reproduction by the queen. In a colony with a single, multiple mating queen, all workers are equally related to male eggs laid by the queen [relatedness (r) = 0.25]. However, each worker is more related to a male egg laid by itself (r=0.5) or a male egg laid by a full sister (r=0.375). So in a colony with a singly mated queen, workers do not eat each other's eggs since their own and other's eggs are more closely related to them than the queen eggs are. But Apis florea is multiply mated, which reduces relatedness of workers to the eggs laid by other workers. If they do not share the same father, then relatedness of a worker to her half sister's son is only 0.125, half that of her relatedness to her brothers. So in this case each worker wants to lay her own eggs but her sisters prevent it and worker policing occurs. As an evolutionarily stable strategy (ESS), workers thus compromise by raising the eggs laid by the queen only and removing any eggs laid by other workers. Worker policing is therefore more beneficial to workers than rearing their own eggs because they are better able to ensure the survival of their genetic material through working policing as an ESS. This may explain why workers have inactive ovaries in queenright colonies of this multiply mated species.

Queenless colonies therefore face a reproductive dilemma. Once a colony becomes queenless, some workers activate their ovaries within just four days and lay eggs in a last effort to ensure gene survival before the colony disappears via absconding behavior. In queenless colonies, worker policing decreases as all workers lay male eggs. However, the dilemma occurs when other workers parasitize a queenless colony and thus worker policing may be re-installed to some extent in this case. Workers that contribute resources and/or time to a queenless colony may succumb to the Concorde fallacy, in which investing in a colony with high rates of parasitism diminishes reproductive success and the benefits of remaining within that colony. Therefore, queenless colonies are observed to abscond within three weeks of losing a queen. This further supports the notion that Apis florea prefer to have a queenright colony and use worker policing as an ESS.

=== Parasites ===
The main parasites of both A. andreniformis and A. florea belong to the mite genus Euvarroa. However, A. andreniformis is attacked by the species Euvarroa wongsirii, while Euvarroa sinhai preys on A. florea and colonies of imported A. mellifera. The two species of Euvarroa have morphological and biological differences: while E. wongsirii has a triangular body shape and a length of 47–54 μm, E. sinhai has a more circular shape and a length of 39–40 μm.

=== Migration ===
Apis florea can migrate to a variety of diverse locations due to human introduction or of their own volition. It poses a threat to native insects like Apis mellifera because they compete for the same resources.

=== Predators ===
The most dominant predators for Apis florea are ants and other arthropods. Since A. florea use open-combs, they must protect their comb from the outside, specifically at site of a branch. They employ two lines of defense. The first is against any falling object like leaves or other debris. A. florea use the head-pushing technique to move obstructions. The second line of defense is against ants and other arthropods. They accomplish this by creating sticky or repellent barriers.

== Human interaction ==
A. florea have two main interactions with humans: hunting and tourism. In Asia, there is widespread hunting of these bees because they are harmless to humans and they also have social and cultural significance to the two main religions in Asia: Hindu and Buddhism. In Hindu culture, the honey from such bees represents “the blendedness of everything” and is served with other ingredients in a variety of traditional ceremonies. In Buddhist culture, gifting honey to fellow monks is considered equal to giving alms, one of the most expressive ways that one can reward a good deed. In addition to being widely hunted and holding high cultural value, honey hunting sites are considered tourist sites in places like Nepal. Increased deforestation due to industrialization has enhanced bee migration to areas which are less populated, thus human interaction is mainly limited to fairly rural regions of Asia.
