= Maria Baciu =

Romanian poet

Maria Baciu (born 4 March 1942) is a Romanian poet, professor, and literary critic. She also writes novels, for adults as well as children. In 2006, she received the 2005 award from the Writers' Union of Romania for children's literature. She taught at the Pedagogical High School in Botoșani.

== Biography ==
Maria Baciu was born on March 4, 1942, in Cernești, Todireni, Botoșani County.) In 1966, she graduated from the Faculty of Philology of Alexandru Ioan Cuza University of Iași. From 1966 to 1970 she was a teacher of Romanian language and literature at the Trușești High School, and from 1970 at the Nicolae Iorga School of Botoșani, moving later to the Pedagogical High School there. She became remarkable for her great didactic activity.

Baciu served as Editor-in-Chief of the Sotron children's magazine in 1994–1996 and of the Pardon! magazine for adolescents. In 1980, she founded the Literary Circle Mihai Eminescu, then in 1983 edited the publication The Educator. In parallel with her departmental and editorial work, she published lyrics, literary articles and reviews in numerous newspapers and magazines. In addition she wrote children's prose, a book of teaching methods for schools, and another on theater for children.

== Publications ==
- "Oglinzi", versuri, Iași, Junimea, 1988
- "Bună dimineața, Puf", poezii pentru copii, Botoșani, Inspectoratul Școlar al județului Botoșani, 1994
- "Cartea cu semnele rupte", poezii, Botoșani, Eldos, 1995
- "Daruri de Crăciun", poezii pentru copii, Iași, Fides, 1996
- "Lume îndrăzneață", Botoșani, Grafik Art, 1998
- "Zodie cu...otrăvuri", Botoșani, Grafik Art, 1998
- "Fetița cu buline", versuri, Timișoara, Ed. Augusta, 2000
- "Vremea fragilor", poezii pentru copii, Augusta, Timișoara, 2000
- "Vinovatul spectacol", poezii, Ed. Augusta, Timișoara, 2001
- Necuprinsele iubiri. Anthology of Baciu's poetry. Augusta, Timișoara, 2003
- Țara ionuților pozitivi. Novel. Grafik-Art, Botoșani, 2003
- "Neîmblînzitele cercuri", Timișoara, Helicon
- Pelerinul ("The Pilgrim"). Poems. 2006
- Ghetuțele copilăriei. Novel for young adults. Axa, 2009
- Et in Arcadia ego. Novel. Axa, 2009

== Bibliography ==
- Silvia Lazarovici, Dicționarul scriitorilor botoșăneni. Geea, 2000.
- Gellu Dorian, Nord – Antologia poeților botoșăneni de azi. Axa, 2009.
