= Varroinae =

Scientific classification
- Kingdom: Animalia
- Phylum: Arthropoda
- Subphylum: Chelicerata
- Class: Arachnida
- Order: Mesostigmata
- Family: Laelapidae
- Subfamily: Varroinae; Delfinado & Baker, 1974

Synonyms
- Varroidae Delfinado & Baker, 1974

Subfamily of mites

Varroinae is a subfamily of parasitic mesostigmatan mites associated with bees.

It was originally established as a family level rank by Delfinado & Baker, 1974, however, subsequently it was revised as a subfamily of Laelapidae in a molecular phylogenetic study by Oh et al., 2024.

As of December 2025 the group includes two genera:

- Euvarroa Delfinado & Baker, 1974
- Varroa Oudemans, 1904
