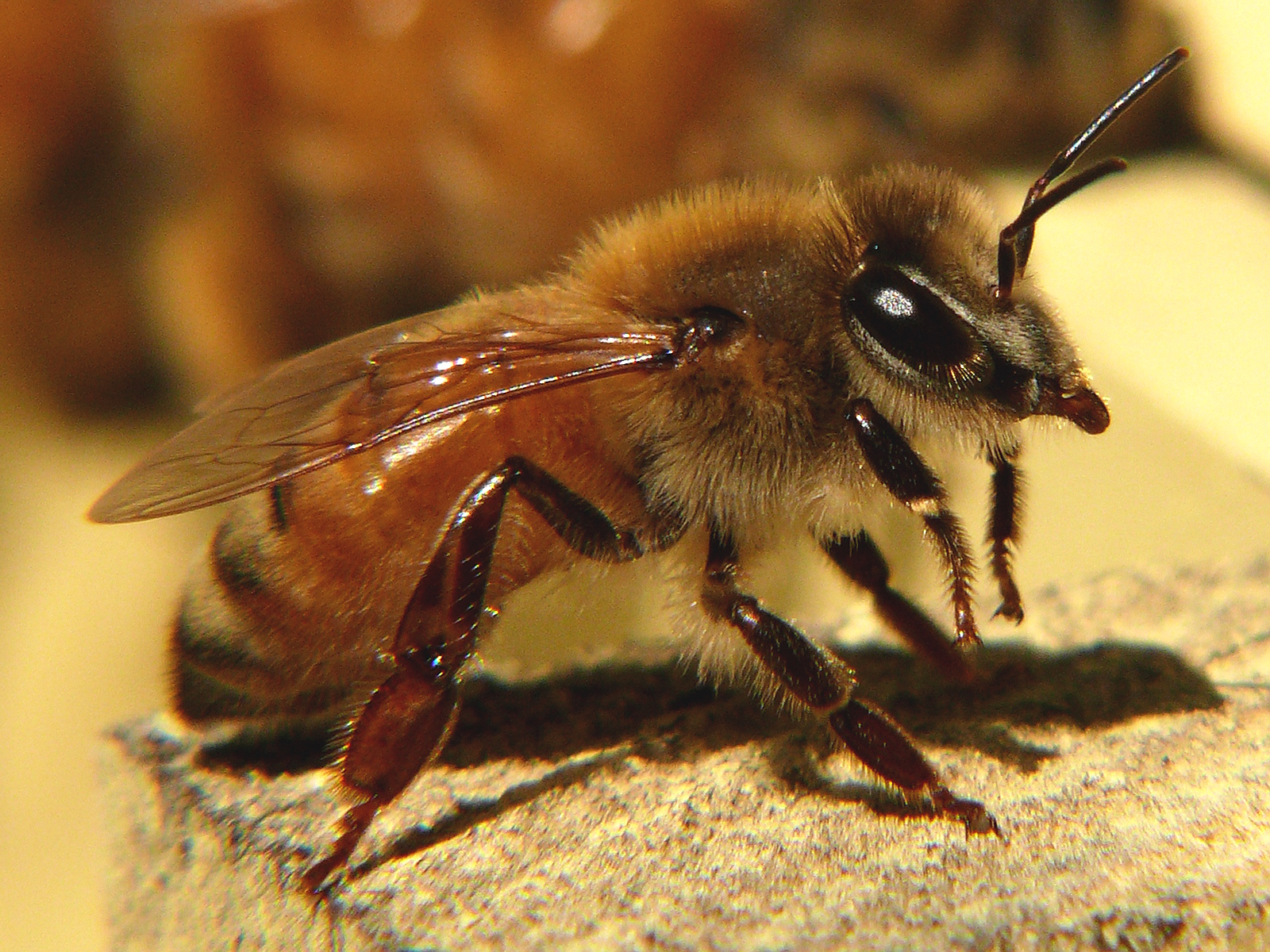

Scientific classification
- Kingdom: Animalia
- Phylum: Arthropoda
- Clade: Pancrustacea
- Class: Insecta
- Order: Hymenoptera
- Family: Apidae
- Genus: Apis
- Species: A. mellifera
- Subspecies: A. m. ligustica

Trinomial name
- Apis mellifera ligustica Spinola, 1806

= Italian bee =

Italian bee Apis mellifera ligustica

Subspecies of honey bee

The Italian bee or Italian honey bee (Apis mellifera ligustica) is a subspecies of the western honey bee (Apis mellifera).

== Origin ==
The Italian honey bee is endemic to the continental part of Italy, south of the Alps, where it survived the last ice age. On Sicily the subspecies is Apis mellifera siciliana. It is likely the most commercially distributed of all honey bees, and has proven adaptable to most climates from subtropical to cool temperate, but it is less successful in humid tropical regions. Italian bees that originate from the Ligurian alps in northern Italy are often referred to as the Ligurian bee, which is claimed only survives on Kangaroo Island.

Italian bees, having been conditioned to the warmer climate of the central Mediterranean, are less able to cope with the "hard" winters and cool, wet springs of more northern latitudes. They do not form such tight winter clusters. More food has to be consumed to compensate for the greater heat loss from the loose cluster. The tendency to raise broods late in autumn also increases food consumption. Noted beekeeper Thomas White Woodbury first introduced the Italian bee to Britain in 1859, and regarded it as vastly superior to the Old British Black bee (A. m. mellifera).

== Anatomy ==
- Color: Abdomen has brown and yellow bands. Among different strains of Italian bees, there are three different colors: Leather; bright yellow (golden); and very pale yellow (Cordovan).
- Size: Their bodies are smaller and their overhairs are shorter than those of the darker honeybee races.
- Tongue length: 6.3 to 6.6 mm
- Mean cubital index: 2.2 to 2.5

== Characteristics ==
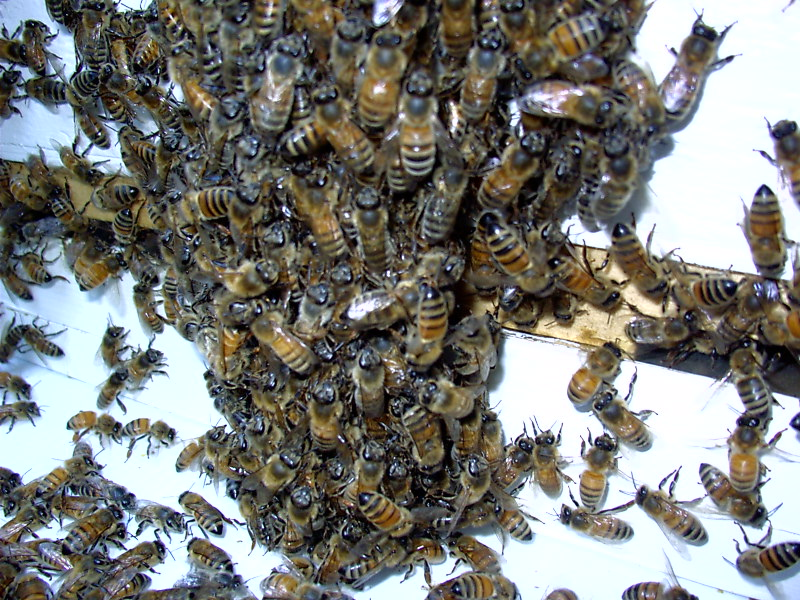
Italian honey bees bearding outside the hive entrance

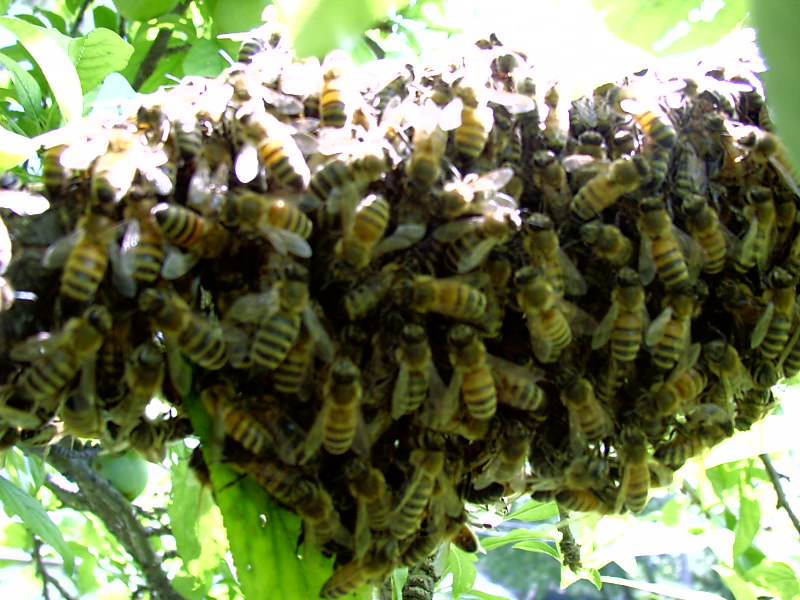
Italian honey bees swarming

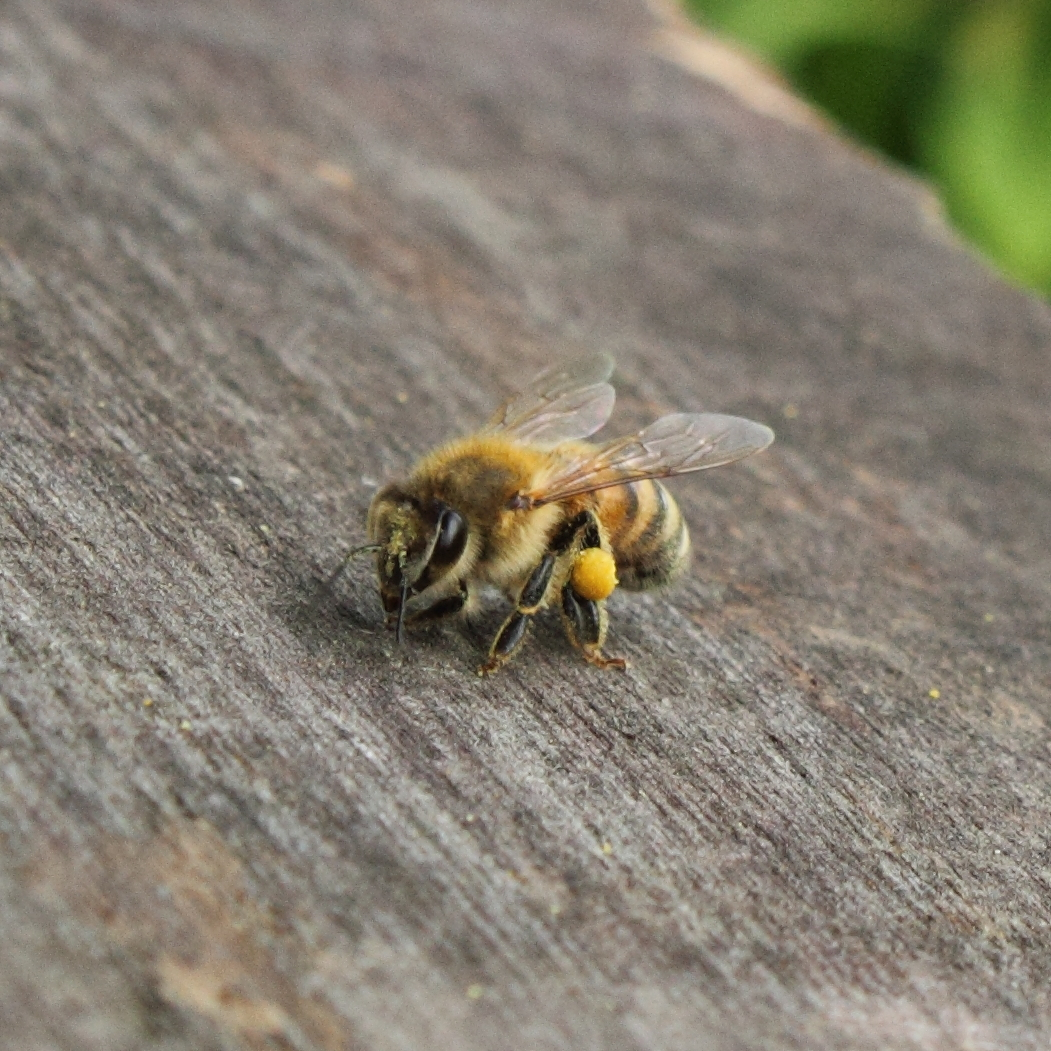
Italian honey bee carrying pollen from flowers

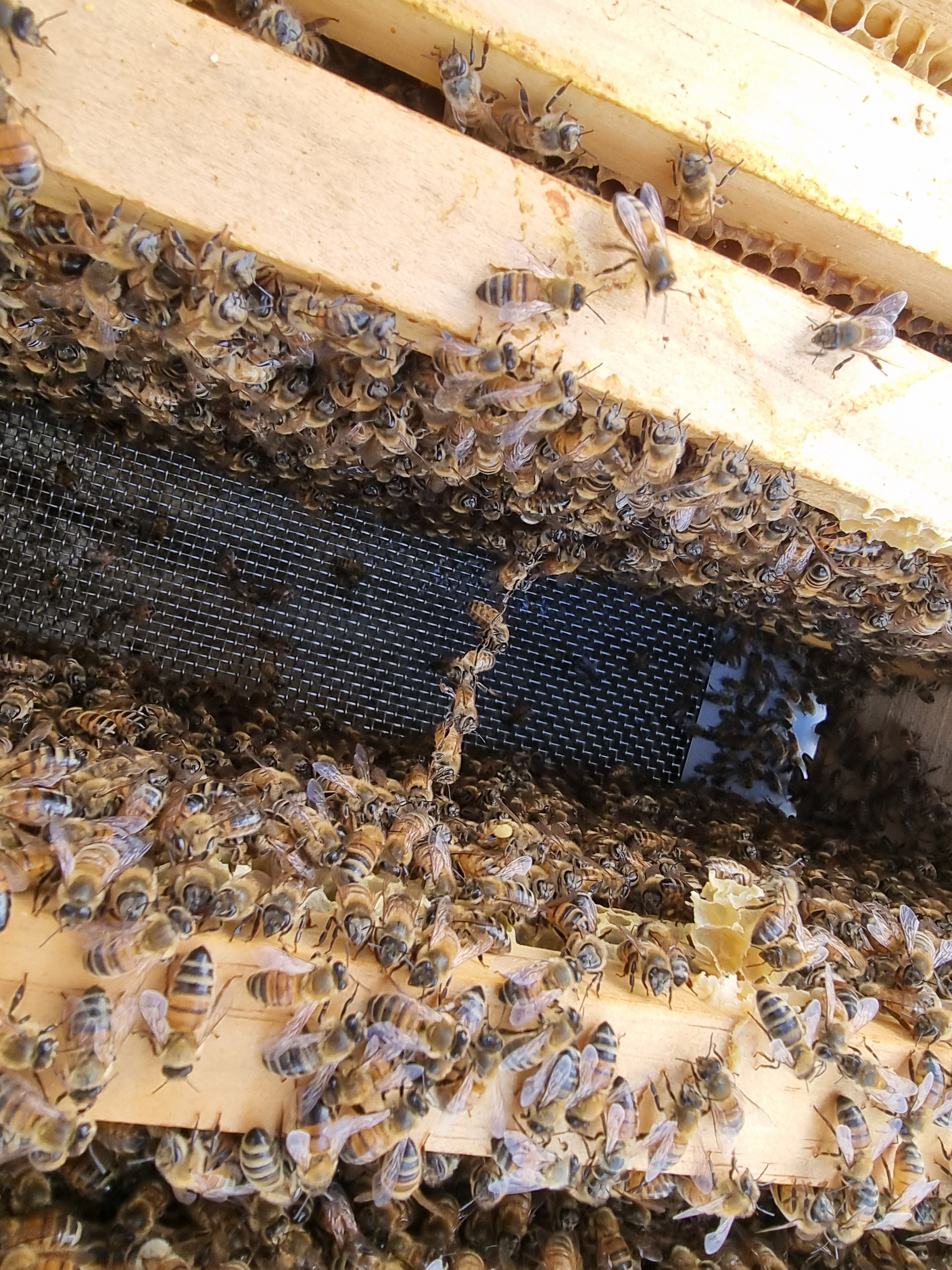
Italian honey bees festooning between two Langstroth hive frames

Brother Adam, a bee breeder and developer of the Buckfast bee, characterized the Italian bee in his book Breeding the Honeybee:

From the commercial and breeding point of view the value of the Ligustica lies in a happy synthesis of a great number of good characteristics. Among these we must mention industry, gentleness, fertility, reluctance to swarm, zeal for building comb, white honey-cappings, a willingness to enter supers, cleanliness, resistance to disease, and the tendency to collect flower honey rather than honey dew. The last-named trait is of value only in countries where the colour of the honey determines the price. The Ligustica has shown that she is able to produce good crops from the red clover. In one other characteristic has the Ligustica proved exceptional and that is in her resistance to Acarine. This is especially true of the dark, leather-coloured variety, whereas the golden strains are highly susceptible to Acarine.

— Brother Adam, "Breeding the Honeybee" (Northern Bee Books: Mytholmroyd, 1987), pp. 96–98.

While the Italian bee has many strong points, among the A.m. ligustica it has a large number of weak points:

The Ligustica has her drawbacks, and these are serious. She lacks vitality and is inclined to excessive brood rearing. These two faults are the root cause of her other disadvantages. She has too a tendency to drift which is caused by a poor sense of orientation and this can prove a drawback where colonies are set out in rows facing in one direction as is the common practice in apiaries almost world-wide ...

Curiously enough, all the above mentioned faults of the Ligustica appear in greatly emphasised form in the very light coloured strains, with an additional one, an unusually high consumption of stores. In European countries such strains have proved highly unsatisfactory as they tend to turn every drop of honey into brood. These light coloured varieties are likewise as already stated unusually susceptible to Acarine. The reason for this is not known in spite of all the work spent on trying to find it. It is all the more surprising when we consider that the dark, leather-coloured Ligustica has over a period of more than 60 years proved to be one of the most resistant to Acarine.

The almost exclusive concentration of these light-coloured Italian strains in North America seems to be due to the fact that in sub-tropical Southern and Western States the large queen-rearing centres are concerned mainly with the sale of bees, where honey production plays a secondary role. Hence they need a bee which is given to brood rearing to an extreme degree, something which in entirely different climatic conditions constitutes a serious drawback.

— Brother Adam, "Breeding the Honeybee" (Northern Bee Books: Mytholmroyd, 1987), pp. 97–98.

=== Strengths ===
- shows strong disposition to breeding and very prolific
- cleanliness/excellent housekeeper (which some scientists think might be a factor in disease resistance)
- uses little propolis
- excellent foragers
- superb comb builder (writing in Switzerland in 1862, H. C. Hermann stated the comb of an Italian bee-cell occupied only 15 cells for every 16 of the common black bee, and the cubic content was larger by 30%)
- covers the honey with brilliant white cappings
- shows lower swarming tendency than other Western honey bee races
- for areas with continuous nectar flow and favorable weather throughout the summer
- industry
- gentleness
- a willingness to enter supers
- tendency to collect flower honey rather than honey dew (of value only in countries where the colour of the honey determines the price)

=== Weaknesses ===
- lacks vitality
- inclined to excessive brood rearing
- susceptibility to disease
- high consumption of stores
- more prone to drifting and robbing than the other principal races of Europe.
- the strong brood rearing disposition often results in large food consumption in late winter or early spring that causes spring dwindling and hence slow or tardy spring development
- brood rearing starts late and lasts long into late summer or autumn, irrespective of nectar flow
- tends to forage over shorter distances than either carnica or mellifera, and may therefore be less effective in poorer nectar flows
- for cool maritime regions
- for areas with strong spring flow
- for areas with periods of dearth of nectar in the summer

== Foraging behavior ==
Apis mellifera ligustica are more concerned with nectar processing behaviors, honey storage, and adult maintenance over brood expansion when compared to the African honey bee, A. m. scutellata.

== Selective breeding ==
Breeders of Italian bees, as well as other honey bee subspecies, look for certain beneficial characteristics. Depending on the breeding goal, one or more of the following characteristics may be emphasized:

1. Gentleness or excitability
2. Resistance to various diseases including tracheal mite and Varroa mite
3. Early spring buildup in population
4. Wintering ability
5. Tendency to limited swarming
6. Ability to ripen honey rapidly
7. Honeycomb cappings are white
8. Minimal use of propolis
9. Availability and queen cost
10. Color

Source: George Imrie's pink pages

== Worldwide distribution ==
- 1853 introduced to Germany
- 1854 introduced into Poland by Dr. Jan Dzierżon
- 1859 introduced into the United Kingdom
- 1859 introduced to the United States
- 1862 introduced to Australia, on 9 December into Victoria aboard the steam ship Alhambra There is strong evidence that the subsequent Italian virgin queens hybridised with the English 'black' bee previously imported (source: Barrett, P. "The Immigrant Bees, 1788 to 1898", Vol. IV). Wilhelm Abram brought several queens from Italy to Sydney in December 1880 but it's probable they reached New South Wales through other hands earlier on.
- 1866 introduced to Russian Empire
- 1880 introduced to New Zealand
- 1884 (Easter) introduced to Kangaroo Island in South Australia, sourced from Brisbane where they were previously imported in 1880 from Italy by Chas. Fullwood. Jas. Carroll received a hive of Italian bees in Brisbane, Queensland, in 1877 when Angus Mackay accompanied a hive aboard the City of New York, packaged by Harbison in California. After a week's stopover in Sydney, the bees arrived in Brisbane. The government of the colony of South Australia passed legislation in 1885 intended to "encourage the culture of Ligurian Bees on Kangaroo Island." Honey from Kangaroo Island is marketed (in 2014) as being from the only pure Ligurian bees in the world.
