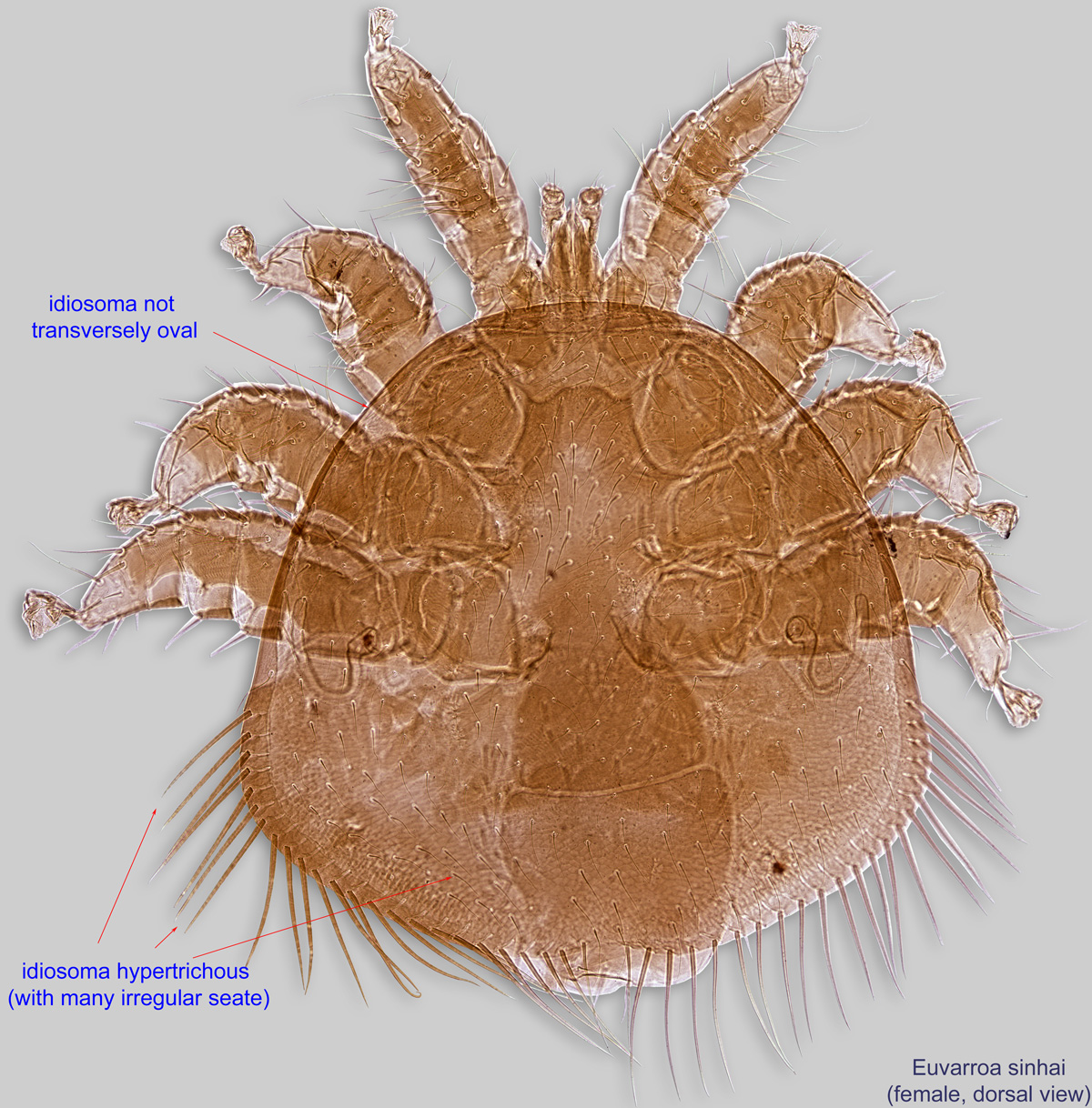

Scientific classification
- Kingdom: Animalia
- Phylum: Arthropoda
- Subphylum: Chelicerata
- Class: Arachnida
- Order: Mesostigmata
- Family: Laelapidae
- Genus: Euvarroa
- Species: E. sinhai

Binomial name
- Euvarroa sinhai Delfinado & Baker, 1974

= Euvarroa sinhai =

Species of bee mite

Euvarroa sinhai is a species of bee mite originally described from India. It can be found in areas ranging from Iran to Thailand, for the latter where and lives alongside Euvarroa wongsirii another bee mite of the same genus. The species E. sinhai is a parasite of bees, using them as a food source. This mite has been found almost exclusively in the bee Apis florea in India and later Sri Lanka and Thailand .
