= Florescu =

Florescu is a Romanian surname. Notable people with the surname include:

- Alexandru Emanoil Florescu (1822–1907), Romanian politician
- Bonifaciu Florescu (1848–1899), Romanian polygraph and politician
- Gheorghe Florescu (born 1984), Romanian footballer
- Ioan Emanoil Florescu (1819–1893), general and Prime Minister of Romania
- Radu Florescu (1925–2014), Romanian historian
- Stefan Florescu (1926/1927–2010), American paralympic swimmer and table tennis player
- Victor Florescu (born 1973), Moldovan judoka

== See also ==
- Florea (name)
- Florești (disambiguation)
