= Robbing =

Robbing is a term used in beekeeping. Bees from one beehive will try to rob honey from another hive.

== Occurrence ==
Robbing behavior is especially strong when there is little nectar in the field. Strong colonies with the largest stores are the most apt to prey upon weaker colonies. Some robbing is carried out so secretly that it escapes notice. Most of the time, when robbing is going on, one can see bees from the opposing hives fight. The fights can lead to significant losses of bees. Robbing may go on between hives in one apiary or hives of different apiaries.

Among the races of the Western honeybee, the Italian bee has been identified with an especially strong tendency to rob.

== Defense measures ==
Robbing can be prevented by reducing the entrances of the hive so the attacked hive has a better chance of defending itself. Bees are immediately attracted when a hive is opened and honey supers are removed.

== Alternative Terminology ==
In the US South, 'robbing' is an archaic term for removing honey. Beekeepers do not actually "rob" bees in modern times, but "harvest a surplus." Some historical methods of bee "keeping" actually were bee "robbing" in that hives were killed for harvest. As recently as the 1940s Southern beekeepers would "sulphur" hives to take honey. This killed the hives and required bee "keepers" to catch spring swarms to replenish their livestock. In some extreme latitudes bees are still killed at the end of the season to take all their honey, then bees are imported from lower latitudes (or even the opposite hemisphere) to begin the next season, but this practice is also dying out, mostly due to expense and movement restrictions.
