= Euvarroa wongsirii =

Scientific classification
- Kingdom: Animalia
- Phylum: Arthropoda
- Subphylum: Chelicerata
- Class: Arachnida
- Order: Mesostigmata
- Family: Laelapidae
- Genus: Euvarroa
- Species: E. wongsirii

Binomial name
- Euvarroa wongsirii Lekprayoon & Tangkanasing, 1991

Species of bee mite

Euvarroa wongsirii is a species of bee mite native to Southeast Asia first records from Thailand, then Malaysia. It can be found in areas ranging from southern China to the Palawan Island of the Philippines and in some mainland regions alongside Euvarroa sinhai a different bee mite species of the same genus Euvarroa first described from India. The species E. wongsirii is a parasite of bees, using them as a food source. This mite has been found almost exclusively in the bee Apis andreniformis.
