= Euvarroa =

Scientific classification
- Kingdom: Animalia
- Phylum: Arthropoda
- Subphylum: Chelicerata
- Class: Arachnida
- Order: Mesostigmata
- Family: Laelapidae
- Subfamily: Varroinae
- Genus: Euvarroa; Delfinado & Baker, 1974

Genus of mites

Euvarroa is a genus of parasitic mesostigmatan mites associated with bees, originally placed into its own family, Varroidae, but later revised as a subfamily.

== Species ==
The genus Euvarroa contains two species:

- Euvarroa sinhai Delfinado & Baker, 1974 – a relatively benign parasite of Apis florea.
- Euvarroa wongsirii Lekprayoon & Tangkanasing, 1991 – a relatively benign parasite of Apis andreniformis.
