= 1–7 Constitution Hill, Birmingham =

Building in Birmingham, England

Coordinates: 52°29′11.83″N 1°54′5.23″W

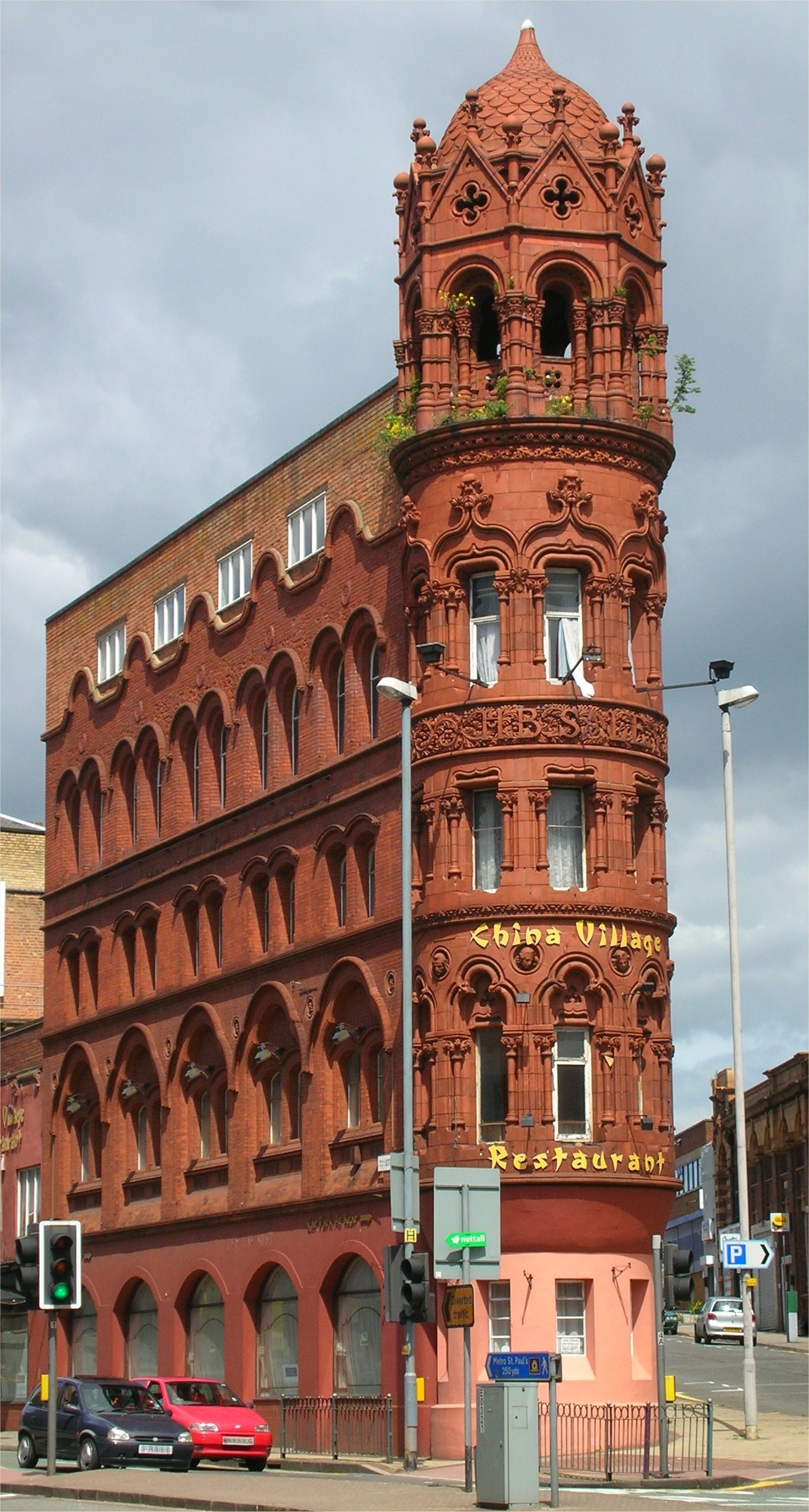
1–7 Constitution Hill

1–7 Constitution Hill in Birmingham, England is a Grade II listed building at the acute junction with Hampton Street, and is a former H.B. Sale factory (grid reference SP 0679 8763). The red brick and terracotta structure is extremely thin, with a tower at one end.

== History ==
It was designed in 1895 and 1896 by William Doubleday and James R. Shaw for H. B. Sale, a die-sinker firm that as of 2012 occupies premises on Summer Lane within 100 metres of the original building. The original plans were for five stories, but only four were built. A fifth storey was added in the mid-20th century before planning laws were in force to protect the integrity of original structures and as a result, the fifth floor is not of the same architectural style of the 1895 building. The tower is original, built in 1896 as a memorial to Lord Roberts of Kandahar (1832–1914) who led a successful campaign in Afghanistan in 1879 before a career in India. Plans show three independent shops and offices at ground level. Each upper floor, measuring approximately 900 square feet (84 m^{2}), was designed as a single workshop with an office in the tower. There was an engine room and dynamo in the basement.

The present owner also purchased the adjacent buildings numbers 9-11 Constitution Hill in the early 1990s in order to provide better access to the listed main body of the property.

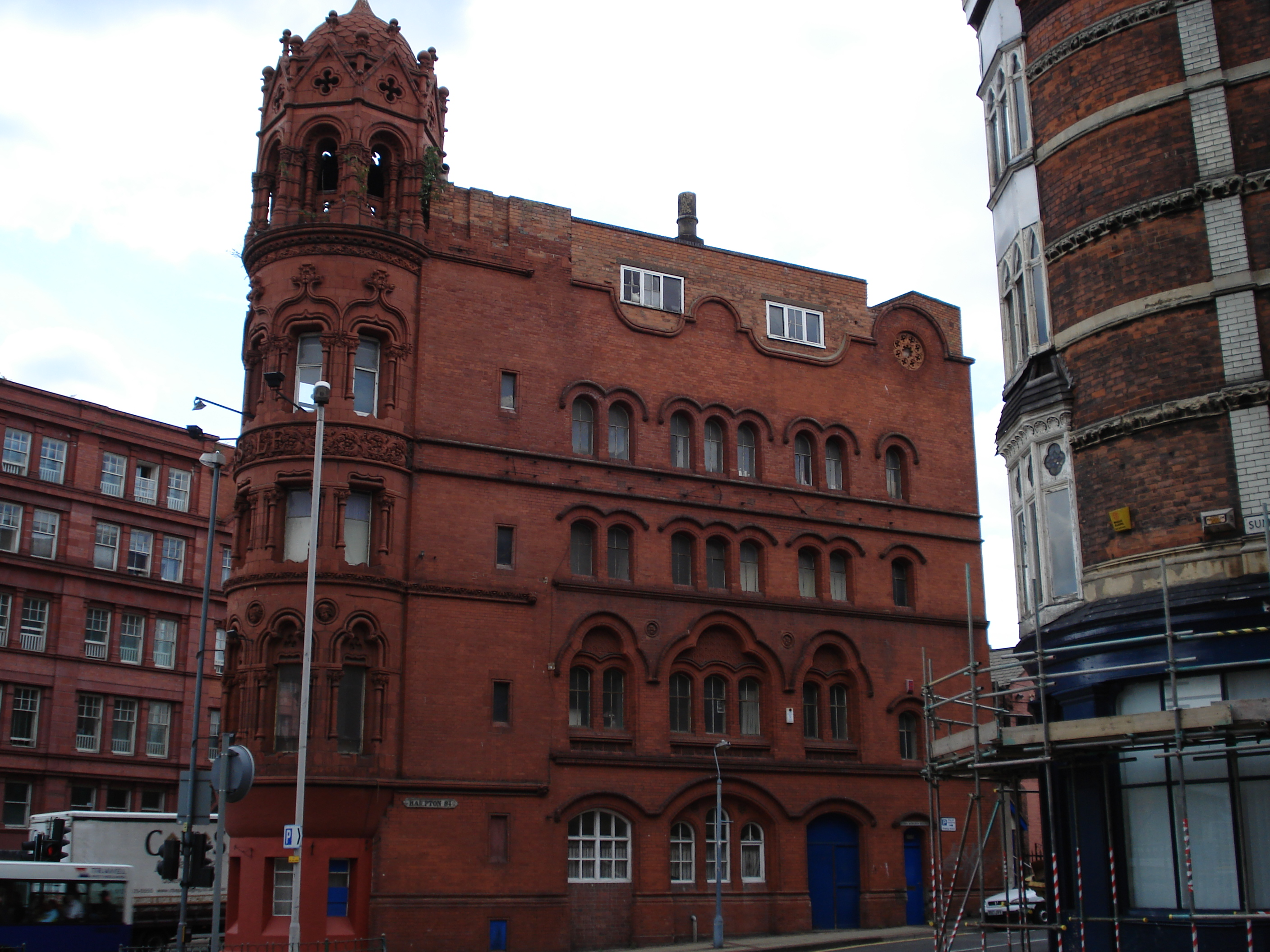
Red Palace from Hampton Street taken 2006

Known locally as the 'Red Palace', the building as of 2007 was only occupied on the top two floors. The lower floors remained empty after the previous tenant, a Chinese restaurant trading as 'China Village', vacated in approximately 2002. The basement floor was used as the kitchens serving the main restaurant on the ground floor and function room on the first floor. The building fabric has been deteriorating for a number of years and needs a significant investment if the building is to survive long term.

The ground and first floor re-opened as a Syrian/Lebanese restaurant called 'Syriana' in April 2008.

In January 2026, the building was the scene of a major fire, requiring the attendance of over 30 firefighters.
