= Nikolay Florea =

Soviet astronomer

Nikolay Florea (Floria) (October 19, 1912, Odessa – October 1941, Vyazma) was a Soviet astronomer of mixed Romanian and Russian origin.

== Biography ==
Florea was born in Odessa in the village of Moldovanca, where many people of Romanian origin have lived since the Middle Ages. His father was a teacher of Latin language. The young Nikolay (Nicolae) was interested in astronomy and begun amateur observations of variable stars at the popular astronomical observatory in that city. Later, he graduated from his secondary school and astronomical department of the University. He was employed as astronomer in Tashkent (Uzbekistan) starting in 1932. In 1934 was transferred to the Shternberg Astronomical Institute of the Moscow State University. He was a scientific secretary of the "Astronomicheskii Zhurnal".

Prior the beginning of the Great Patriotic War (22 June 1941) he finished the 1-st part of his doctoral work. After the beginning of the War he was a volunteer and participated in the battles near the town of Vyazma 200 km southwest from Moscow. He died in October 1941. Nikolay Florea (Floria) is the father of Russian historian and Slavist, corresponding member of the Russian Academy of Sciences, Boris Florea (Floria).

== Publications ==
- ADS NASA
