= Todireni =

- Commune
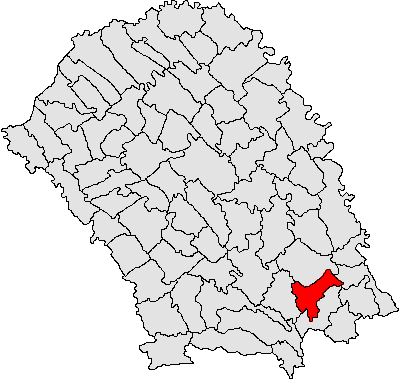
- Location in Botoșani County

- Location in Romania
- Coordinates: 47°38′N 27°7′E
- Country: Romania
- County: Botoșani
- Subdivisions: Todireni, Cernești, Florești, Gârbești, Iurești

Government
  - Mayor (2024–2028): Petru Toma (PSD)
- Area: 59.8 km^{2} (23.1 sq mi)
- Elevation: 85 m (279 ft)
- Population (2021-12-01): 3,344
  - Density: 56/km^{2} (140/sq mi)
- Time zone: EET/EEST (UTC+2/+3)
- Postal code: 717395
- Area code: +40 x31
- Vehicle reg.: BT

Todireni is a commune in Botoșani County, Western Moldavia, Romania. It is composed of five villages: Cernești, Florești, Gârbești, Iurești and Todireni.

== Natives ==
- Maria Baciu
