= Cubital index =

Ratio of two of the wing vein segments of honeybees

Cubital index is the ratio of two of the wing vein segments of honeybees. The cubital index is used in morphology, the study of form and structure, one way to differentiate species and sub species of living organisms. The pattern of the veins of the fore wings is specific for each breed of bees. The cubital index is consistent for a given race of bee. It can be used to distinguish between similar populations of honeybees and to determine degrees of hybridization.

Cubital index

== Procedure ==
To obtain reliable average results, at least 100 bee fore wings have to be analyzed. Measurements are taken under a dissecting microscope with a magnification of 10x to 20x.

== See also ==
- Beekeeping
- Western honeybee
