= Edward Wilson (journalist) =

English-Australian journalist and philanthropist

Edward Wilson (13 November 1813 – 10 January 1878) was an English-Australian journalist and philanthropist.

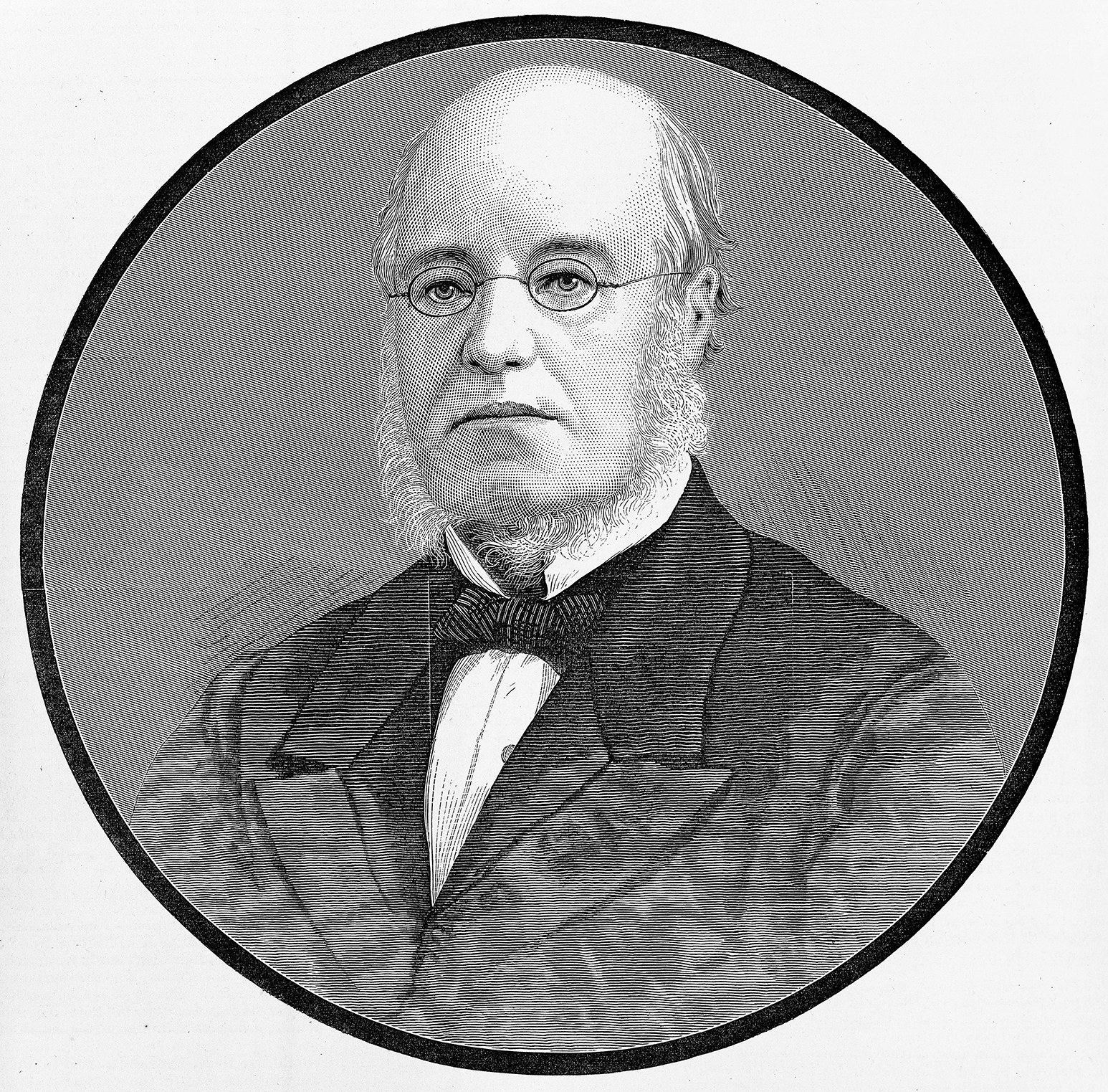

== Family ==
The second of the three children of John Wilson (1774–1834), a linen draper, and Mary Wilson (née Jones; 1766–1838), Edward Wilson was born at Hampstead, London on 13 November 1813. He never married.

== Education ==
He was educated at a "large private school" in Hampstead – where, among his schoolmates, were William Clark Haines (1810–1866), the first Premier of Victoria, the brothers James Spowers (1813–1879) and Allan Spowers (1815–1876), proprietors of The Argus, and Douglas Thomas Kilburn (1813–1871), the artist, ethnographer, and daguerreotypist.

Having left school, with his parents wanting him to "engage in commerce", he entered a business house at Manchester, and subsequently went to London, involved in the "Manchester trade".

== Australia ==
In 1842 he migrated to Australia.

He bought The Argus around 1847.

Costs of running the Argus had increased and Wilson was close to ruin, but was saved when Lauchlan Mackinnon bought a partnership from James Gill, and took over management.

=== Rambles at the Antipodes ===
In 1857 and 1858, he travelled throughout colonial Australia and New Zealand, and on to England – where he consulted experts in relation to his failing eyesight (due to cataracts) – via the "Overland Route"; and, whilst doing so wrote an extended series of 21 articles for The Argus' newspaper. The articles, which were published on a regular basis (often three articles in a single week), were later collected together and published in their aggregate (with an additional statistical appendix, and 12 lithographs by Samuel Thomas Gill) in 1859, as Rambles at the Antipodes (1859).

== Death ==
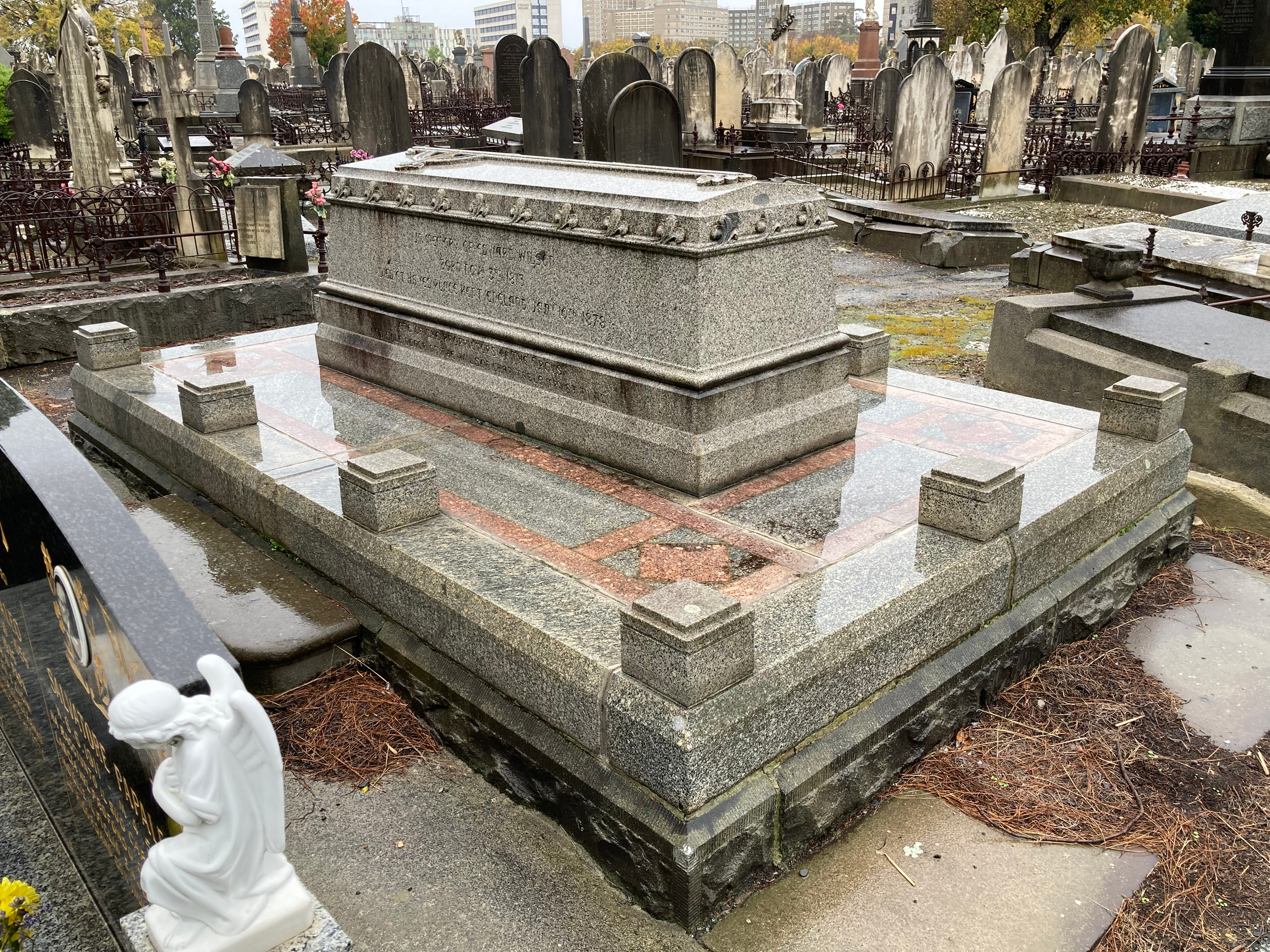
Wilson's grave at Melbourne General Cemetery

He died at Hayes, in Kent, on 10 January 1878. His remains were repatriated to Australia on the SS Aconcagua, and he was buried in the Melbourne General Cemetery, on 7 July 1878, in a grave that "is immediately opposite the burial place of Sir Charles Hotham".

== Estate ==
The bulk of his estate was used to form the Edward Wilson Trust which since his death has distributed several million dollars to Victorian charities, in particular the Melbourne, Alfred and Children's hospitals in Victoria.

== Works ==
- Wilson, Edward (1856a), "The Aborigines", The Argus, (Sunday, 16 March 1856), pp.4-5.
- Wilson, Edward (1856b), "The Aborigines", The Sydney Morning Herald, (Saturday, 22 March 1856), p.5: a better quality reprint of 1856a.
- Wilson, Edward (1857a), "Moreton Bay. No.I", The Argus, (Saturday, 22 August 1857), p.4.
- Wilson, Edward (1857b), "Moreton Bay. No.II", The Argus, (Saturday, 24 August 1857), p.5.
- Wilson, Edward (1857c), "Moreton Bay (No.III)", The Argus, (Thursday, 27 August 1857), p.5.
- Wilson, Edward (1858), "The Overland Route. No.VI", The Argus, (Monday, 18 October 1858), p.5.
- Wilson, Edward (1857d), "A Trip down the Murray (No.I)", The Argus, (Tuesday, 24 November 1857), p.5.
- Wilson, Edward (1857e), "A Trip down the Murray (No.II)", The Argus, (Thursday, 26 November 1857), p.4.
- Wilson, Edward (1857f), "A Trip down the Murray (No.III)", The Argus, (Wednesday, 2 December 1857), p.5.
- Wilson, Edward (1857g), "A Trip down the Murray (No.IV)", The Argus, (Saturday, 5 December 1857), p.5.
- Wilson, Edward (1857h), "A Trip down the Murray (No.V)", The Argus, (Saturday, 5 December 1857), p.5.
- Wilson, Edward (1857i), "A Trip down the Murray (No.VI)", The Argus, (Tuesday, 8 December 1857), p.5.
- Wilson, Edward (1858a), "A Glance at New Zealand. No.I", The Argus, (Friday, 11 June 1858), p.5.
- Wilson, Edward (1858b), "A Glance at New Zealand. No.II", The Argus, (Saturday, 12 June 1858), p.5.
- Wilson, Edward (1858c), "A Glance at New Zealand. No.III", The Argus, (Monday, 14 June 1858), p.5.
- (Wilson, Edward (1858d), "A Glance at New Zealand. No.IV")
- Wilson, Edward (1858e), "A Glance at New Zealand. No.V", The Argus, (Friday, 18 June 1858), p.5.
- Wilson, Edward (1858f), "The Overland Route. No.I", Supplement to The Argus, (Tuesday, 12 October 1858), p.1.
- Wilson, Edward (1858g), "The Overland Route. No.II", Supplement to The Argus, (Wednesday, 13 October 1858), p.1.
- Wilson, Edward (1858h), "The Overland Route. No.III", Supplement to The Argus, (Thursday, 14 October 1858), p.1.
- Wilson, Edward (1858i), "The Overland Route. No.IV", The Argus, (Friday, 15 October 1858), p.6.
- Wilson, Edward (1858j), "The Overland Route. No.V", Supplement to The Argus, (Saturday, 16 October 1858), p.1.
- Wilson, Edward (1858k), "The Overland Route. No.VI", Supplement to The Argus, (Monday, 18 October 1858), p.5.
- Wilson, E (1859), Rambles at the Antipodes: A Series of Sketches of Moreton Bay, New Zealand, the Murray River and South Australia, and the Overland Route: With two Maps and twelve Tinted Lithographs, illustrative of Australian Life, by S.T. Gill, London : W.H. Smith and Son.
