= List of honey bee pheromones =

The pheromones of the honey bee are mixtures of chemical substances released by individual bees into the hive or environment that cause changes in the physiology and behaviour of other bees.

== Introduction ==
Honey bees (Apis mellifera) have one of the most complex pheromonal communication systems found in nature, possessing 15 known glands that produce an array of compounds. These chemical messengers are secreted by a queen, drone, worker bee or laying worker bee to elicit a response in other bees. The chemical messages are received by the bee's antenna and other body parts. They are produced as a volatile or non-volatile liquid and transmitted by direct contact as a liquid or vapor.

Honey bee pheromones can be grouped into releaser pheromones which temporarily affect the recipient's behavior, and primer pheromones which have a long-term effect on the physiology of the recipient. Releaser pheromones trigger an almost immediate behavioral response from the receiving bee. Under certain conditions a pheromone can act as both a releaser and primer pheromone.

The pheromones may either be single chemicals or a complex mixture of numerous chemicals in different percentages.

== Types of honey bee pheromones ==
=== Alarm pheromone ===
Two main alarm pheromones have been identified in honeybee workers. One is released by the Koschevnikov gland, near the sting shaft, and consists of more than 40 chemical compounds, including isopentyl acetate (IPA), butyl acetate, 1-hexanol, n-butanol, 1-octanol, hexyl acetate, octyl acetate, n-pentyl acetate and 2-nonanol. These chemical compounds have low molecular weights, are highly volatile, and appear to be the least specific of all pheromones. Alarm pheromones are released when a bee stings another animal, and attract other bees to the location and causes the other bees to behave defensively, i.e. sting or charge. The alarm pheromone emitted when a bee stings another animal smells like bananas. Smoke can mask the bees' alarm pheromone.

The other alarm pheromone is released by the mandibular glands and consists of 2-heptanone, which is also a highly volatile substance. This compound has a repellent effect and it was proposed that it is used to deter potential enemies and robber bees. The amounts of 2-heptanone increase with the age of bees and becomes higher in the case of foragers. It was therefore suggested that 2-heptanone is used by foragers to scent-mark recently visited and depleted foraging locations, which indeed are avoided by foraging bees. However, this has recently been proven false. In a new discovery, it was determined that bees actually use 2-heptanone as an anesthetic and to paralyze intruders. After the intruders are paralyzed, the bees remove them from the hive.

=== Brood recognition pheromone ===
Another pheromone is responsible for preventing worker bees from bearing offspring in a colony that still has developing young. Both larvae and pupae emit a "brood recognition" pheromone. This inhibits ovarian development in worker bees and helps nurse bees distinguish worker larvae from drone larvae and pupae. This pheromone is a ten-component blend of fatty-acid esters, which also modulates adult caste ratios and foraging ontogeny dependent on its concentration. The components of brood pheromone have been shown to vary with the age of the developing bee. An artificial brood pheromone was invented by Yves Le Conte, Leam Sreng, Jérome Trouiller, and Serge Henri Poitou and patented in 1996.

=== Drone pheromone ===
Drone Mandibular Pheromone attracts other flying drones to suitable sites for mating with virgin queens.

=== Dufour's gland pheromone ===
The Dufour's gland (named after the French naturalist Léon Jean Marie Dufour) opens into the dorsal vaginal wall. Dufour’s gland and its secretion have been somewhat of a mystery. The gland secretes its alkaline products into the vaginal cavity, and it has been assumed to be deposited on the eggs as they are laid. Indeed, Dufour’s secretions allow worker bees to distinguish between eggs laid by the queen, which are attractive, and those laid by workers. The complex of as many as 24 chemicals differs between workers in "queenright" colonies and workers of queenless colonies. In the latter, the workers’ Dufour secretions are similar to those of a healthy queen. The secretions of workers in queenright colonies are long-chain alkanes with odd numbers of carbon atoms, but those of egg-laying queens and egg-laying workers of queenless colonies also include long chain esters.

=== Egg marking pheromone ===
This pheromone, similar to that described above, helps nurse bees distinguish between eggs laid by the queen bee and eggs laid by a laying worker.

=== Footprint pheromone ===
This pheromone is left by bees when they walk and is useful in enhancing Nasonov pheromones in searching for nectar.

In the queen, it is an oily secretion of the queen's tarsal glands that is deposited on the comb as she walks across it. This inhibits queen cell construction (thereby inhibiting swarming), and its production diminishes as the queen ages.

=== Forager pheromone ===
Ethyl oleate is released by older forager bees to slow the maturing of nurse bees. This primer pheromone acts as a distributed regulator to keep the ratio of nurse bees to forager bees in the balance that is most beneficial to the hive.

=== Nasonov pheromone ===
Nasonov pheromone is emitted by the worker bees and used for orientation and recruitment. Nasonov pheromone includes a number of terpenoids including geraniol, nerolic acid, citral and geranic acid.

=== Other pheromones ===
Other pheromones produced by most honey bees include rectal gland pheromone, tarsal pheromone, wax gland and comb pheromone, and tergite gland pheromone.

== Types of queen honey bee pheromones ==
=== Queen mandibular pheromone ===
Queen mandibular pheromone (QMP), emitted by the queen, is one of the most important sets of pheromones in the bee hive. It affects social behavior, maintenance of the hive, swarming, mating behavior, and inhibition of ovary development in worker bees. The effects can be short term or long term or both. Some of the chemicals found in QMP are carboxylic acids and aromatic compounds. The following compounds have been shown to be important in retinue attraction of workers to their queen and other effects.

- (E)-9-Oxodec-2-enoic acid (9-ODA) – inhibits queen rearing as well as ovarian development in worker bees; strong sexual attractant for drones when on a nuptial flight; critical to worker recognition of the presence of a queen in the hive
- (R,E)-(−)-9-Hydroxydec-2-enoic acid] (-9-HDA) promotes stability of a swarm, or a "calming" influence
- (S,E)-(+)-9-Hydroxydec-2-enoic acid (+9-HDA)
- Methylparaben (also known as methyl p-hydroxybenzoate) (HOB)
- 4-Hydroxy-3-methoxy phenylethanol (HVA)

Work on synthetic pheromones was done by Keith N. Slessor, Lori-ann Kaminski, Gaylord G. S. King, John H. Borden, and Mark L. Winston; their work was patented in 1991. Synthetic queen mandibular pheromone (QMP) is a mixture of five components: 9-ODA, (−)-9-HDA, (+)-9-HDA, HOB and HVA in a ratio of 118:50:22:10:1.

=== Queen retinue pheromone ===
The following compounds have also been identified, of which only coniferyl alcohol is found in the mandibular glands. The combination of the 5 QMP compounds and the 4 compounds below is called the queen retinue pheromone (QRP). These nine compounds are important for the retinue attraction of worker bees around their queen.

- Methyl oleate
- Coniferyl alcohol
- Cetyl alcohol
- α-Linolenic acid

=== Other ===
The queen also contains an abundance of various methyl and ethyl fatty acid esters, very similar to the brood recognition pheromone described above. They are likely to have pheromonal functions like those found for the brood recognition pheromone.

== References listed alphabetically by author ==
- Imrie, George Georg Imrie's, Pink Pages Nov. 1999
- Katzav-Gozansky Tamar (2002). "Review" (PDF). Apidologie. 33: 525–537. doi:10.1051/apido:2002035.
- Blum, M.S. 1992. Honey bee pheromones in The Hive and the Honey Bee, revised edition (Dadant and Sons: Hamilton, Illinois), pages 385–389.
- Boch R., Shearer D.A. (1971). "Chemical releasers of alarm behaviour on the honey-bee, Apis mellifera". Journal of Insect Physiology. 17 (12): 2277–2285. Bibcode:1971JInsP..17.2277B. doi:10.1016/0022-1910(71)90077-1.
- Butler, C. 1609. The Feminine Monarchie. On a Treatise Concerning Bees, and the Due Ordering of them. Joseph Barnes: Oxford.
- Free, John B., Pheromones of social bees. Ithaca, N.Y.: Comstock, 1987.
- Imrie, George George Imrie's Pink Pages November 1999 accessed Feb. 2005
- Keeling C. I., Slessor K. N., Higo H. A., Winston M. L. (2003). "New components of the honey bee (Apis mellifera L.) queen retinue pheromone". Proceedings of the National Academy of Sciences. 100 (8): 4486–4491. Bibcode:2003PNAS..100.4486K. doi:10.1073/pnas.0836984100. PMC 153582. PMID 12676987.
- Leoncini I., Le Conte Y., Costagliola G., Plettner E., Toth A. L., Wang M., Huang Z., Bécard J.-M., Crauser D., Slessor K. N., Robinson G. E. (2004). "Regulation of behavioral maturation by a primer pheromone produced by adult worker honey bees". Proceedings of the National Academy of Sciences. 101 (50): 17559–17564. doi:10.1073/pnas.0407652101. PMC 536028. PMID 15572455.
- Maschwitz U (1964). "Alarm substances and alarm behavior in social Hymenoptera". Nature. 204 (4956): 324–327. Bibcode:1964Natur.204..324M. doi:10.1038/204324a0. S2CID 4271328.
- Moritz, Burgin H (1987). "Group response to alarm pheromones in socialwasps and the honeybees". Ethology. 76 (1): 15–26. Bibcode:1987Ethol..76...15M. doi:10.1111/j.1439-0310.1987.tb00668.x.
- Slessor K. N., Kaminski L.-A., King G. G. S., Borden J. H., Winston M. L. (1988). "Semiochemical basis of the retinue response to queen honey bees". Nature. 332 (6162): 354–356. Bibcode:1988Natur.332..354S. doi:10.1038/332354a0. S2CID 4362366.
- Vander Meer, R.K. et al. 1998. Pheromone Communication in Social Insects; Boulder: Westview Press
- Wager B.R., Breed M.D. (2000). "Does honeybee sting alarm pheromone give orientation information to defensive bees?". Annals of the Entomological Society of America. 3 (6): 1329–1332. doi:10.1603/0013-8746(2000)093[1329:DHBSAP]2.0.CO;2.
