= 9-Oxodecenoic acid =

9-oxodecenoic acid

Names
- Other names 9-oxo-2(E)-decenoic acid 9-ODA; Queen substance

Identifiers
| CAS Number | 334-20-3 |
| 3D model (JSmol) | Interactive image |
| ChEBI | CHEBI:165439 |
| ChemSpider | 1362276 |
| PubChem CID | 1713086 |
| UNII | 618LR3X900 |
- InChI: InChI=1S/C10H16O3/c1-9(11)7-5-3-2-4-6-8-10(12)13/h6,8H,2-5,7H2,1H3,(H,12,13)/b8-6+ Key: INJRDZMWIAYEMM-SOFGYWHQSA-N
- SMILES: CC(=O)CCCCC/C=C/C(=O)O

Properties
| Chemical formula | C_{10}H_{16}O_{3} |
| Molar mass | 184,23 g·mol^{−1} |
| Appearance | transparent flakes |
| Melting point | 54.5–55.5 °C (130.1–131.9 °F; 327.6–328.6 K) |
- Except where otherwise noted, data are given for materials in their standard state (at 25 °C [77 °F], 100 kPa). Infobox references

9-Oxodecenoic acid (9-oxo-2(E)-decenoic acid, also called 9-ODA) is an unsaturated ketocarboxylic or fatty acid and a pheromone secreted by the queen bee of the honeybee species Apis mellifera. It functions as a sex attractant that stimulates the olfactory receptors of male drones. Additionally, this acid plays a crucial role in regulating the colony's social structure; it inhibits the development of ovaries in worker bees, which are sterile females. However, its inhibitory effect on the worker bees' ovaries is only fully effective when combined with another pheromone, 9-hydroxydecenoic acid. When the queen bee is removed from the hive, the worker bees initiate the construction of new queen cells and the previously inhibited workers develop functional ovaries. The exact biological mechanisms through which 9-oxodecenoic acid and related substances influence these processes are not fully understood, but they are thought to affect the nervous system in some way.

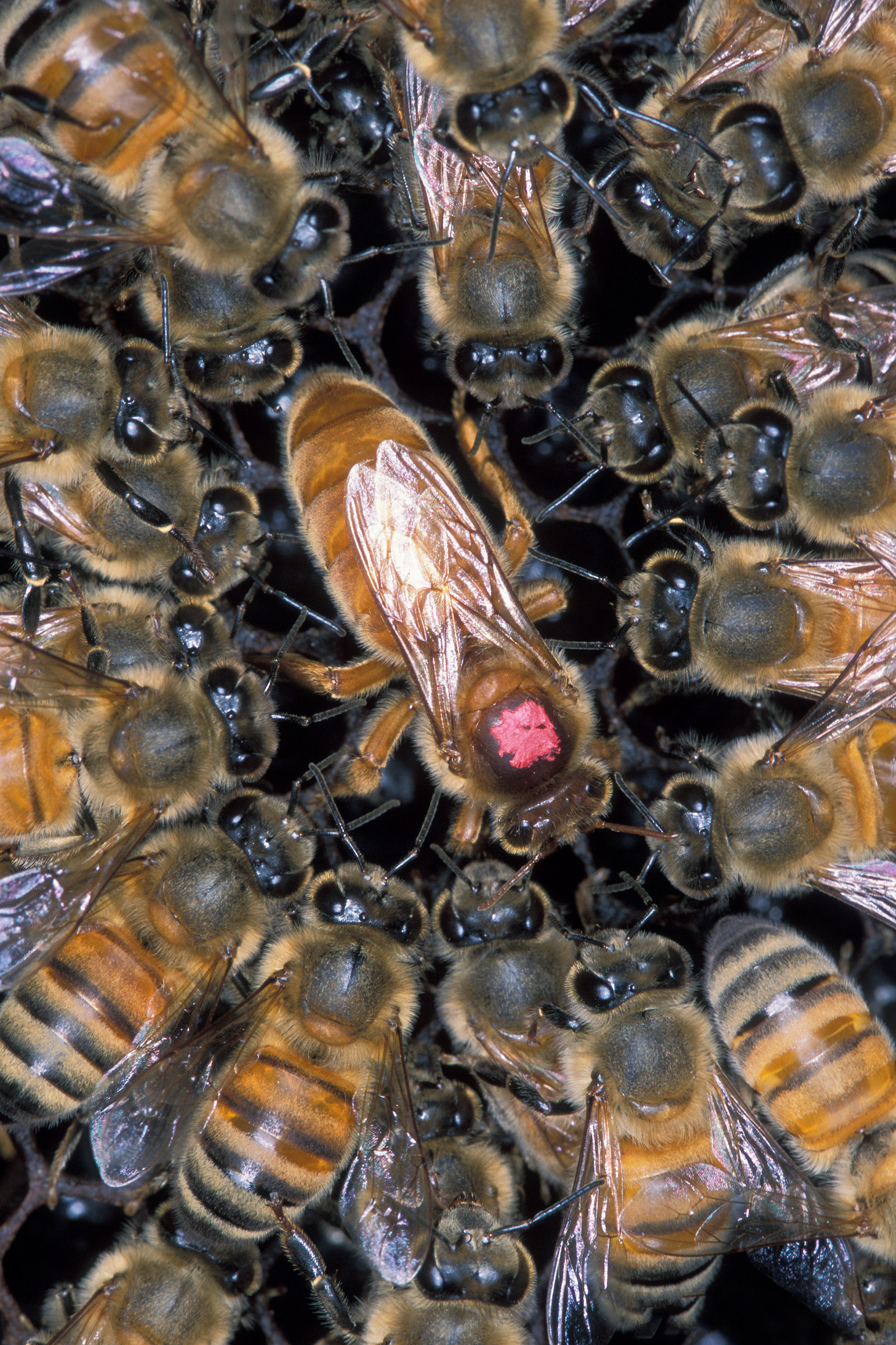
9-Oxodecenoic acid is an important component of the pheromone of queen bees (center)

== Synthesis ==
9-Oxodecenoic acid can be synthesized starting from azelaic acid.

An efficient synthesis is possible starting from diethyl-3-oxoglutarate. This is alkylated by 6-bromo-1-hexene and magnesium ethanolate, then decarboxylated. The double bond is oxidized to the aldehyde with osmium tetroxide and sodium periodate in aqueous tert-butanol. The acid group is introduced by condensation with malonic acid.
