= Honey bee life cycle =

Life cycle of Apis mellifera

The honey bee life cycle, here referring exclusively to the domesticated Western honey bee, depends greatly on their social structure.

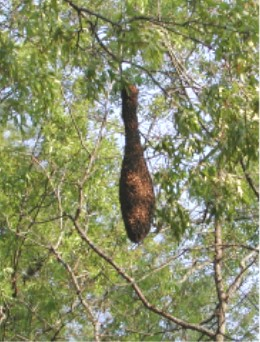
Honey bee swarm pitched on a high limb

== Honey bee colony life ==
Unlike a bumble bee colony or a paper wasp colony, the life of a honey bee colony is perennial. The three types of honey bees in a hive are: queens (egg-producers), workers (non-reproducing females), and drones (males whose main duty is to find and mate with a queen). Unlike the worker bees, drones do not sting. Honey bee larvae hatch from eggs in three to four days. They are then fed by worker bees and develop through several stages in hexagonal cells made of beeswax. Cells are capped by worker bees when the larva pupates. Queens and drones are larger than workers, so require larger cells to develop. A colony may typically consist of tens of thousands of individuals.

While some colonies live in hives provided by humans, so-called "wild" colonies (although all honey bees remain wild, even when cultivated and managed by humans) typically prefer a nest site that is clean, dry, protected from the weather, about 20 litres (4.4 imp gal; 5.3 US gal) in volume with a 4–6 cm^{2} (0.62–0.93 sq in) entrance about 3 m (9.8 ft) above the ground, and preferably facing south or south-east (in the Northern Hemisphere) or north or north-east (in the Southern Hemisphere).

== Development ==
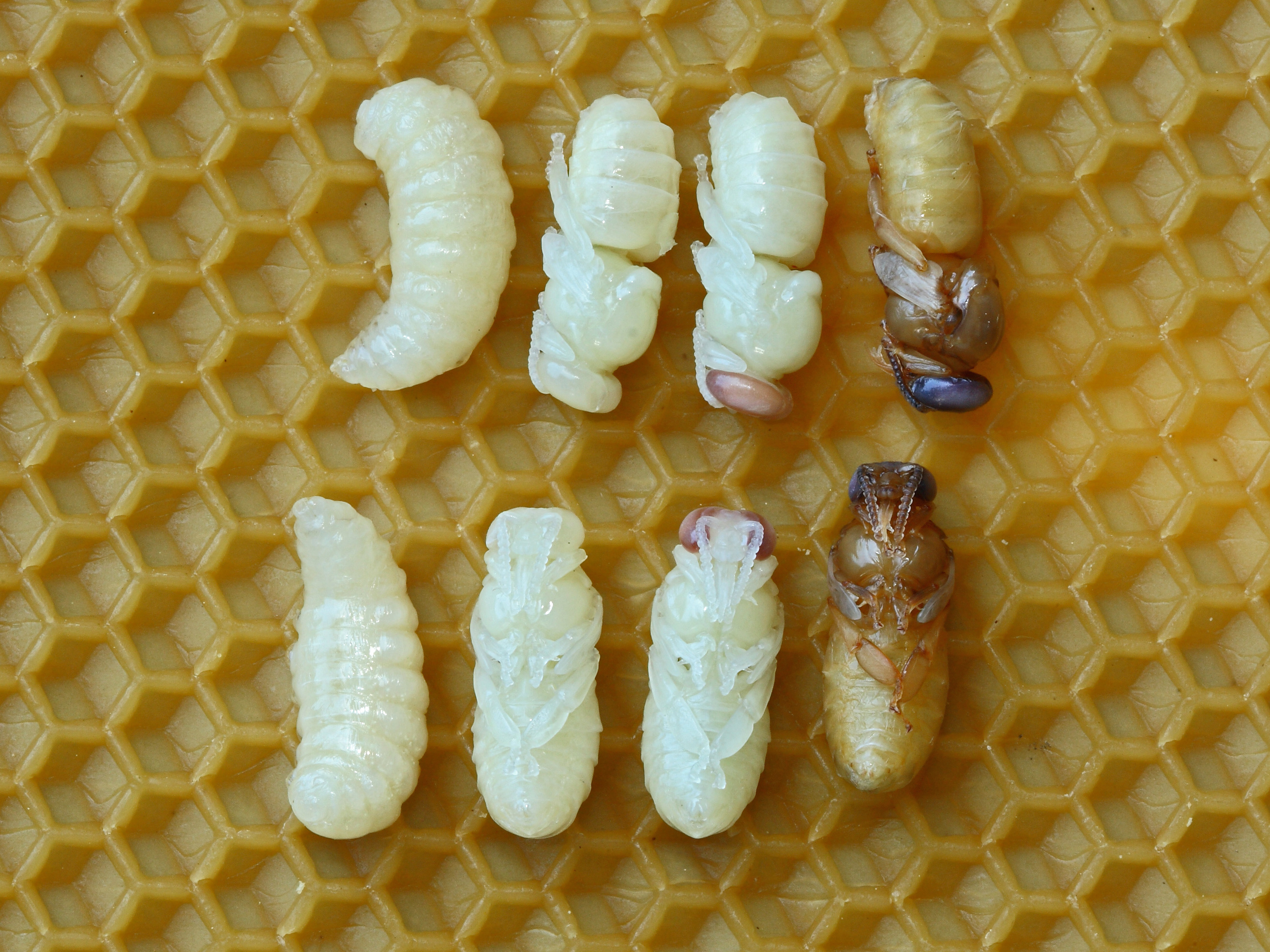
Stages of development of the drone pupae

Development from egg to emerging bee varies among queens, workers, and drones. Queens emerge from their cells in 15–16 days, workers in 21 days, and drones in 24 days. Only one queen is usually present in a hive. New virgin queens develop in enlarged cells through differential feeding of royal jelly by workers. When the existing queen ages or dies or the colony becomes very large, a new queen is raised by the worker bees. When the hive is too large, the old queen will take half the colony with her in a swarm. This occurs a few days prior to the new queen emerging. If several queens emerge they will begin piping (a high buzzing noise) signaling their location for the other virgin queens to come fight. Once one has eliminated the others, she will go around the hive chewing the sides of any other queen cells and stinging and killing the pupae. The queen takes one or several nuptial flights to mate with drones from other colonies, which die after mating. After mating, the queen begins laying eggs. A fertile queen is able to lay fertilized or unfertilized eggs. Each unfertilized egg contains a unique combination of 50% of the queen's genes and develops into a (haploid) drone. The fertilized eggs develop into either (diploid) workers or queens (if fed exclusively royal jelly).

Every honey bee (Apis mellifera) in a hive exists to perform specific duties determined by its sex and age. Like every member of its colony, the nurse honey bee plays a vital role in the survival of its hive. Nurse bees are charged with the care and feeding of the queen and the next generation.

The average lifespan of a queen is three to four years; drones usually die upon mating or are expelled from the hive before winter; and workers may live for a few weeks in the summer and several months in areas with an extended winter.

Type	Egg	Larva	Cell capped	Pupa	Average developmental period (days until emergence)	Start of fertility	Body length	Weight on emerging
Queen	up to day 3	up to day 8½	day 7½	day 8 until emergence	16 days	day 23 and up	18–22 mm (0.71–0.87 in)	nearly 200 mg (3.1 gr)
Worker	up to day 3	up to day 9	day 9	day 10 until emergence (day 11 or 12 last moult)	21 days (range: 18–22 days)	N/A	12–15 mm (0.47–0.59 in)	nearly 100 mg (1.5 gr)
Drone	up to day 3	up to day 9½	day 10	day 10 until emergence	24 days	about 38 days	15–17 mm (0.59–0.67 in)	nearly 200 mg (3.1 gr)

The weight progression of the worker egg, larva:

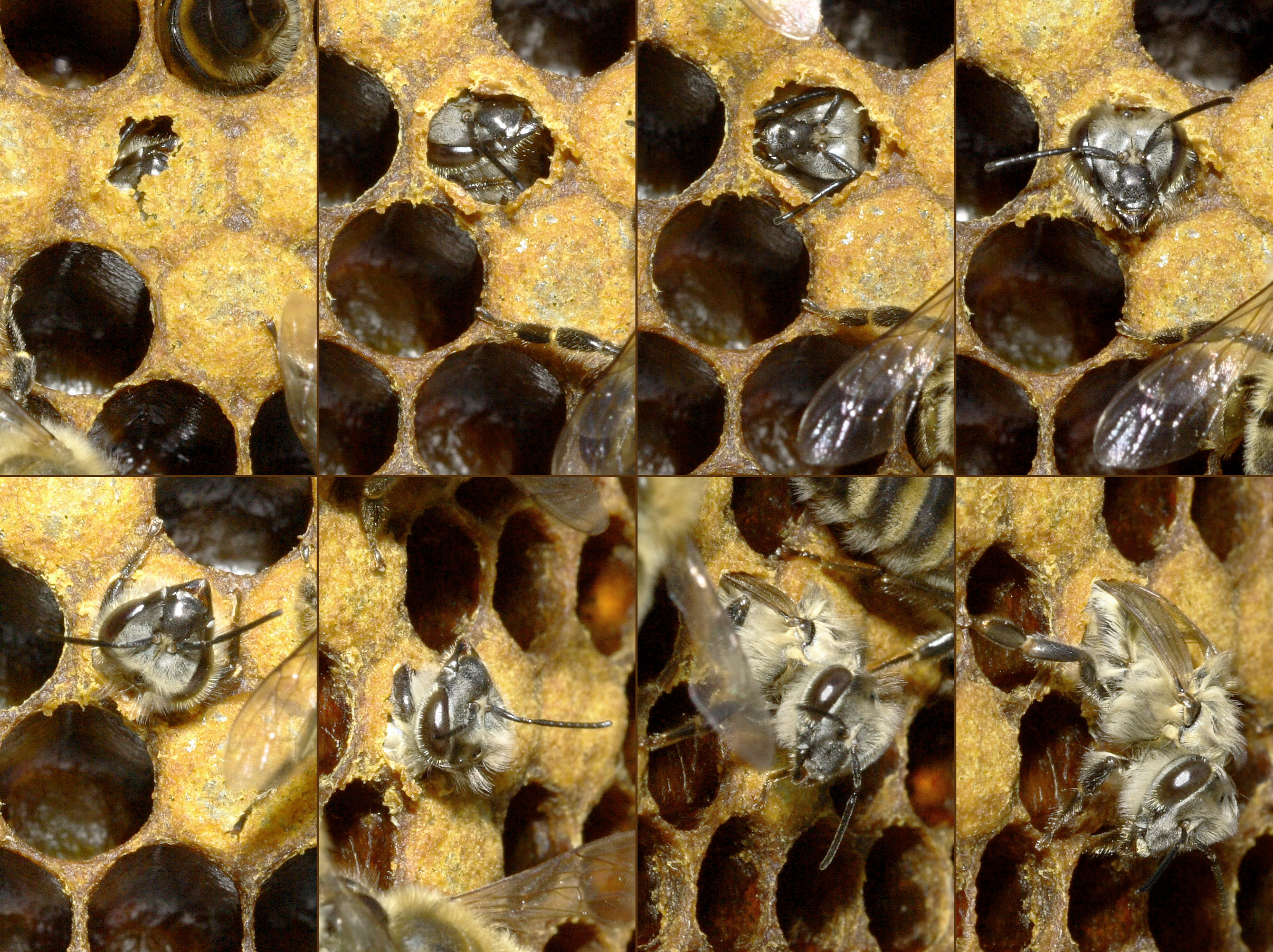
Worker bee emerging from cell

Days	Developmental state	Weight	Length	Food source
1	egg	0.132 mg (0.00204 gr)	1.2 mm (0.047 in)	yolk
2	egg	not listed		yolk
3	egg	0.09 mg (0.0014 gr)		yolk
4	larva	not listed		royal jelly
5	larva	3.4 mg (0.052 gr)		royal jelly
6	larva	33.3 mg (0.514 gr)		royal jelly/honey and pollen (bee bread)
7	larva	100.1 mg (1.545 gr)		honey and pollen (bee bread)
8	larva	134.5 mg (2.076 gr)		honey and pollen (bee bread)
9	larva	155.2 mg (2.395 gr)		honey and pollen (bee bread)

== See also ==
- Bee bole
- Bee colonies
- Winter cluster

== Sources ==
- Development of honeybees bee-info.com, accessed Oct 2005
- Stanley E. Flanders (1960). "Caste in the honey bee". Insectes Sociaux. 7 (1): 9–16. doi:10.1007/BF02225754. S2CID 1733996.
- H. Rembold (1964). "Die Kastenentstehung bei der Honigbiene, Apis mellifica L". Naturwissenschaften. 51 (3): 49–54. Bibcode:1964NW.....51...49R. doi:10.1007/BF00603442. S2CID 27276793.
- Temporal Polyethism in Bees
- The Beekeepers
- Waring, Claire; Waring, Adrian (2015). Bee Manual: The Complete Step-by-Step Guide to Keeping Bees. Haynes. ISBN 978-0857338099.
