= Nuc =

Small honey bee colony

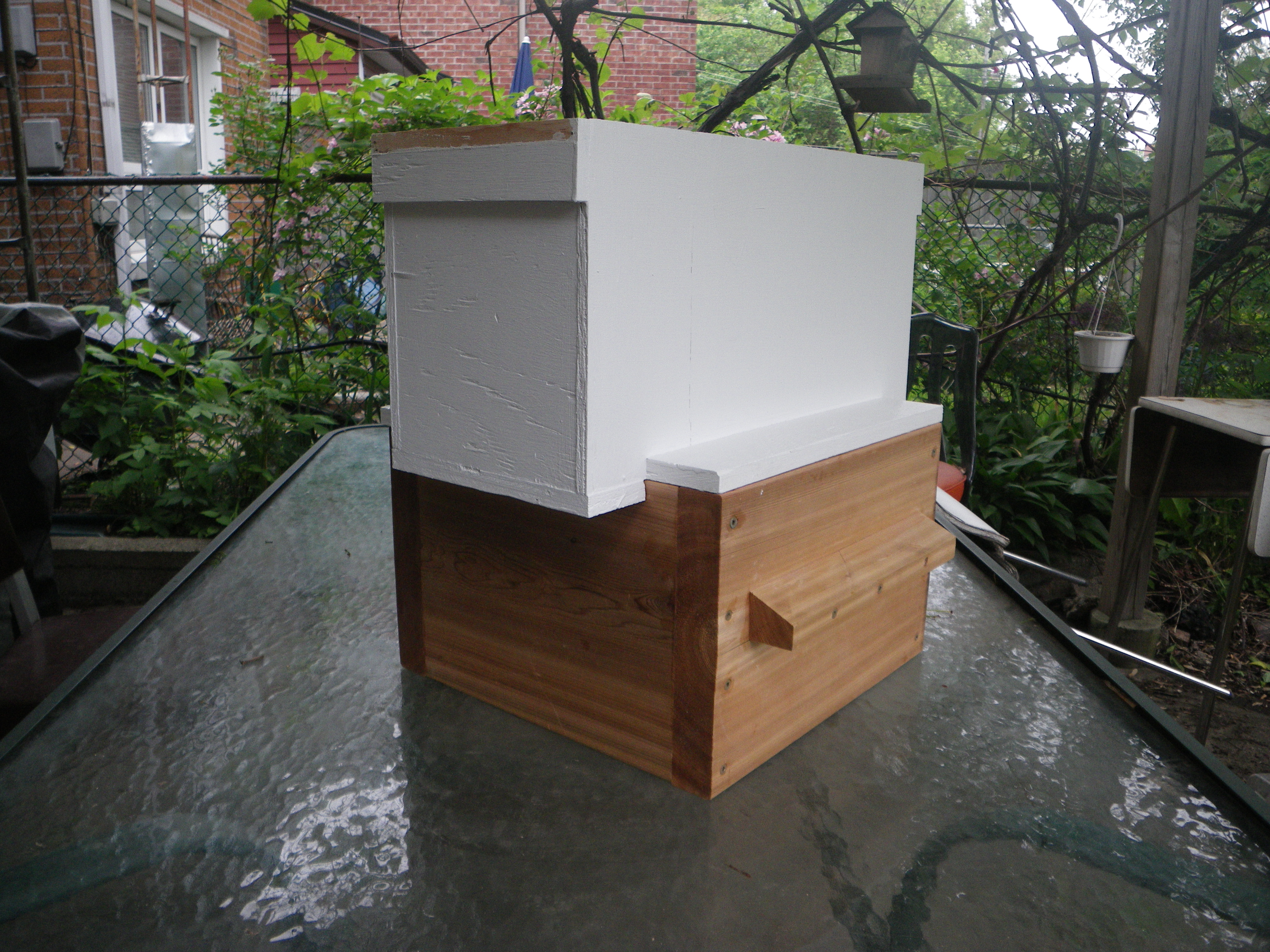
A langstroth nuc box set-up to transition a colony to a warré box

A nuc, or nucleus colony, is a small honey bee colony created from larger colonies, packages, or captured swarms. A nuc hive is centered on a queen bee, the nucleus of the honey bee colony.

== Layout ==
A nuc hive has all the features of a standard 10 frame Langstroth hive, except for a reduced width. A typical nuc has 5 Langstroth frames arranged side-by-side.

Nucs can also be created using other hive dimensions, with the British modified national hive being the most common in the United Kingdom. According to FERA's (Food and Environment Research Agency) National Bee Unit guidelines, the nucleus should be between 3–6 frames of bees, including a queen, workers, brood in all stages, and honey stores.

== Creation ==
The nuc box, also called a nuc, is a smaller version of a normal beehive, designed to hold fewer frames. A smaller space makes it easier for the bees to control the temperature and humidity of the colony, which is vital for brood rearing. When using a Langstroth hive, a nuc is created by pulling two to five frames from an existing colony. These frames and the nurse bees clinging to them form the basis for the nuc colony.

A nuc may or may not be given a queen at the time it is created. If the nuc does not contain a queen or queen-cell, but does contain eggs, the workers will create a new queen from one of the eggs. If the nuc is to be given a new queen, the queen will be introduced to the colony in her queen cage. This happens either at the time the nuc is split from the main colony, or after a period of queenlessness, which increases the likelihood that the new queen will be accepted.

== Uses ==
Nucs are often used to prevent swarming in a larger colony by removing frames with queen-cells, and using the new queens to artificially create a new colony. The removal of queen cells and reduction in population in the donor colony diminish the urge to swarm. This procedure may also be called a “walk-away split.”

A nuc also can be used to care for spare queens. The loss of a queen in a large colony can set the colony back by up to a month. A nucleus colony can be combined with the larger colony to re-queen it with a much smaller break in brood rearing.

The terms 'nuc' and 'split' are not strictly interchangeable. While a nuc may have a number of different uses, a split more often refers to dividing a colony for the purposes of growing the removed bees back to a full-sized colony.

A nuc normally is not intended for overwintering, as nuc colonies do not possess large enough winter clusters to survive winter in harsher climates. Beekeepers often combine nucs in the fall to produce a single, strong colony. This does result in the loss of all but one queen, but provides a colony capable of surviving winter. Nucs also can survive winter indoors, or in an observation hive.

== Care and feeding ==
A nuc is extremely vulnerable, as it possesses, in some cases, less than a tenth of the workers in a normal colony.

Nucs are almost always fed using a boardman feeder or frame feeder. Feeding allows the worker bees to remain in the nuc, acting as nurse bees for developing brood. Due to their small population, nucs are vulnerable to robbing, in which a stronger hive steals all the nectar, honey, or syrup, from a weaker hive. The bees from a robbing hive will kill any bees that defend the nuc. Robbing can lead to starvation in days.

== Mating nucs ==
Mating nucs are a special type of nuc that may be even smaller than nucs that use standard size frames. These are sometimes called mini-mating nucs. Mating nucs are used in a queen mating yard. A capped queen cell is put into a mating nuc together with a sufficient number of attendant worker bees. When the virgin queen emerges and matures (a process that takes around five to seven days from the point at which she emerges), she flies out and mates with up to 20 drones before returning to the mating nuc. When mating is successful a nice brood pattern can be seen on the frames of the mating nuc. Successfully mated queens are caged and shipped to be used as production queens by beekeepers. Queen breeders raise thousands of queens in this fashion.
