= Mating yard =

A mating yard is a term for an apiary which consists primarily of queen mating nucs and hives which raise drones. A queen bee must mate in order to lay fertilized eggs, which develop into workers and other queens, which are both female. Queens can lay eggs parthenogenetically, but these will always develop into drones (males).

== Mating nucs ==
A mating yard allows dozens of queens to mate and begin to lay. The hives in a mating yard are primarily mating nucs or drone producing hives.

Mating nucs are smaller than normal nucs, often containing non self-sustaining numbers of bees.

The beekeeper will replenish the workers in a mating nuc by shaking additional bees into mating nucs when their population is running low.

== Drone producing hives ==
Drone producing hives produce abnormally large numbers of drones. By using drone foundation in the brood nest a beekeeper can produce a large drone population to saturate the drone congregation area with drones of a given stock. Saturating the drone congregation area improves the odds that the queen will mate with drones of a particular lineage, but does not guarantee it.

== Open mating ==
This method of mating is called "open mating." Once a queen is mated and the beekeeper observes the laying pattern, the queen will be removed, caged and sold. The mating nuc will receive another queen cell or virgin queen and the process will repeat.
