= Queen mandibular pheromone =

Honey bee pheromone

Queen mandibular pheromone, or QMP, is a honey bee pheromone produced by the queen and fed to her attendants who share it with the rest of the colony to give the colony the sense of belonging to the queen. Newly emerged queens produce very little QMP. By the sixth day they are producing enough to attract drones for mating. A laying queen makes twice that amount. Lack of QMP seems to attract robber bees. A study of foraging worker bees has suggested that foraging bees are not attracted to QMP.

== Chemical composition ==
Queen mandibular pheromone (QMP) is classically defined as a synergistic five-component blend produced by the queen's mandibular glands. It consists of (E)-9-oxodec-2-enoic acid (9-ODA), the two enantiomers (R,E)-(−)- and (S,E)-(+)-9-hydroxydec-2-enoic acid (9-HDA), methyl 4-hydroxybenzoate (HOB), and 4-hydroxy-3-methoxyphenylethanol (HVA). The five components act synergistically in eliciting the worker retinue response.

== Drones ==
QMP functions as a sex pheromone for drones, attracting males to an unmated queen. 9ODA specifically is known to attract drones over long distances, and its combination with 9HDA and 10HDA at close range increases drone attraction to the queen.

Drone detection of 9ODA begins in the antennae, triggering a pathway that leads to behavioral responses. This begins with diffusion of 9ODA through the antennae's pores, into the lymph of the olfactory sensillum. The hydrophilic domain of carrier protein ASP1 binds to an apolar region of 9ODA, forming a complex that is transported to olfactory receptors located in the olfactory receptor neurons (ORNs). Olfactory receptor AmOR11 specifically is involved in responding to the pheromone/carrier complex. Although expressed in all castes, expression of AmOR11 is significantly higher in drones, further suggesting its role in 9ODA detection. The binding of the pheromone/carrier to AmOR11 sends a signal to the brain's primary olfactory centres. The specific neural pathway by which 9ODA causes behavioral changes is not yet developed in bees, however research shows olfactory signals from floral odors are integrated to the level of mushroom bodies. Research has not been conducted for the 9ODA pathway.

== Workers ==
Components of QMP also function as a retinue pheromone, causing retinue behavioral and physiological changes in the female worker bees. Changes in QMP's chemical composition following a queen's mating attract young worker bees to her, fulfilling her feeding and grooming requirements. QMP is transferred through contact from the queen to young workers, and in turn to the rest of the hive's workers. In doing so, the queen elicits behavioral changes in remaining workers, preventing the rearing of new queens, and preventing ovary development.

Behavioral changes in the workers as a result of QMP exposure is thought to be mediated through changes in juvenile hormone (JH) level. 9ODA specifically leads to changes in the endocrine organs, via the brain's mushroom bodies. QMP moderates the decrease in JH synthesis in young bees, preventing foraging behaviour.

== Queen retinue pheromone ==
Slessor (2005) differentiates QMP from queen retinue pheromone, on the basis of three fatty-acid constituents which are not derived from the mandibular gland.

== Effects on physiological features ==
Research has indicated that queen mandibular pheromones were capable of altering the physiology of the worker bees. Research indicates that when reared larvae are not fed queen mandibular pheromones, they develop more ovarioles, larger mandibular glands, larger Dufour glands, and smaller hypopharyngeal glands, all traits commonly seen in queen bees. Similarly, Nasonov gland size has been shown to decrease in worker bees who were not fed the queen mandibular pheromones as larvae.

== Beekeeping ==
Sometimes beekeepers re-queen their hives for various reasons. Some beekeepers place these now-unneeded queens in alcohol. The alcohol preserves the deceased queen and her pheromones. This "queen juice" can then be used as a lure in swarm traps. The dead queen is either placed in a swarm trap or a q-tip or cottonball dipped in the alcohol into a swarm trap. The alcohol evaporates, leaving the queen pheromone which may enhance the chances of a swarm moving into a trap.

=== Queen Pheromone Strips ===
Queen pheromone strips are a technology used to replicate the presence of a queen and act as a substitute for queenless colonies. These queen pheromone strips are imbued with queen mandibular pheromones. Being a cheaper alternative to actual queens, these strips are often used in research settings, serving as a substitute for the queen in research relating to the queen mandibular pheromones. Replicating the effects of queen mandibular pheromones, the strips and pheromones themselves was shown to increase Ecdysteroid titers in bees exposed to the pheromone continuously. Likewise, use of queen pheromone strips has shown that queen mandibular pheromones are capable of affecting dopamine receptor genes (Amdop1 and Amdop3), in turn, influencing attraction to the pheromone as the worker bees age.
