= QMP =

QMP may refer to:

- Qualitätswein mit Prädikat, a former German wine classification
- Queen mandibular pheromone in honey bees
- Queen Mary Park, Edmonton, Alberta, Canada
- Quintessential Player, a freeware media player
