= QRP =

QRP may refer to:

- QRP operation in amateur radio, low-power transmitting
- Queen retinue pheromone, a type of honey bee pheromones
- Queens Road Peckham railway station, National Rail code
- Quadratic residuosity problem in mathematics
- Questionable research practices, see research ethics
