= Taranov board =

A Taranov board is a system to separate honey bees that will leave the hive with the queen bee from the bees that will stay behind in the parent hive during swarming, as well as the device used in this system.
