= Drone congregation area =

Location where bees mate

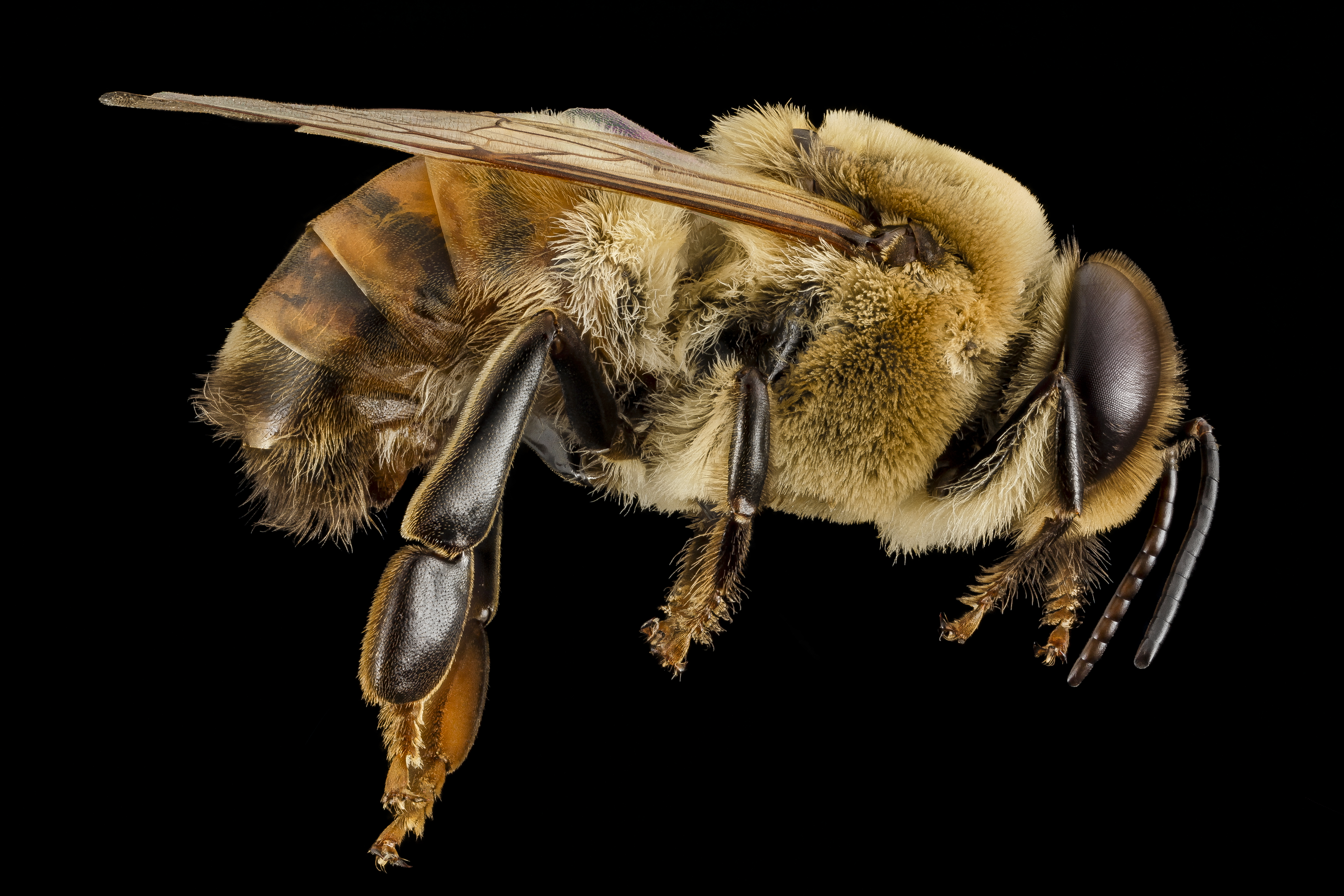
Honeybee drone photographed by the USGS Bee Inventory and Monitoring Lab

A drone congregation area is an aerial region where honeybee drones and virgin queens gather to mate.

== Makeup ==
Drone congregation areas are typically about 100 metres (300 ft) in diameter and 15–30 metres (50–100 ft) above ground. They have the shape of an upward-pointing cone, with the drone density being lower towards the top. The boundaries are sharply defined: drones will not mate with queens even slightly outside the area.

Over the course of a day, approximately 12,000 drones visited one drone congregation area, and the drones represented at any one congregation area can be from hundreds of different colonies. However, these population numbers are highly variable depending on circumstances.

== Geographical features ==
It is not known exactly why drone congregation areas have the locations they do, or how bees locate them. However, there is considerable evidence that they depend on static features of the landscape. Drones will congregate in these areas even in the absence of queens, and stay in similar areas year-to-year, with one drone congregation area staying in the same location for almost 200 years. Additionally, if drones are brought in from outside the local area, they still quickly find the local congregation areas.

Most drone congregation areas are open spaces surrounded by a barrier; the open area provides visibility while the barrier (vegetation, hills, etc.) provides shelter from the wind. The bees also tend to fly to low elevations. South-facing locations are also preferred in the Northern hemisphere; this may be due to differences in solar irradiance or the bees' magnetoreception.

== Flyways ==
Drones find their way to drone congregation areas along flyways, specific shared trajectories. These generally follow features in the landscape, such as lines of trees. Drone congregation areas often occur at the intersection of flyways, though not all intersections form congregation areas. Flyways, like drone congregation areas, are stable over a period of years.

== Role of pheromones ==
Pheromones also play a role in coalescing drones to the exact location of the queen. The International Bee Research Association's standard procedure for locating drone congregation areas involves using a queen or a (pheromone-marked) dummy queen to attract drones from the diffuse cluster of a typical drone congregation area into a visible clump. In addition to drone attraction to queens, drones are attracted to other drones and virgin queens are attracted to drones.
