= Koschevnikov gland =

Gland in a honeybee

The Koschevnikov gland is a gland of the honeybee located near the sting shaft. The gland produces an alarm pheromone that is released when a bee stings. The pheromone contains more than 40 different compounds, including pentylacetate, butyl acetate, 1-hexanol, n-butanol, 1-octanol, hexylacetate, octylacetate, and 2-nonanol. These components have a low molar mass and evaporate quickly. This collection of compounds is the least specific of all pheromones. The alarm pheromone is released when a honey bee stings another animal to attract other bees to attack, as well. The release of the alarm pheromone may entice more bees to sting at the same location. Smoking the bees can reduce the pheromone's efficacy.
