= Laying worker bee =

Worker bee that lays unfertilized eggs

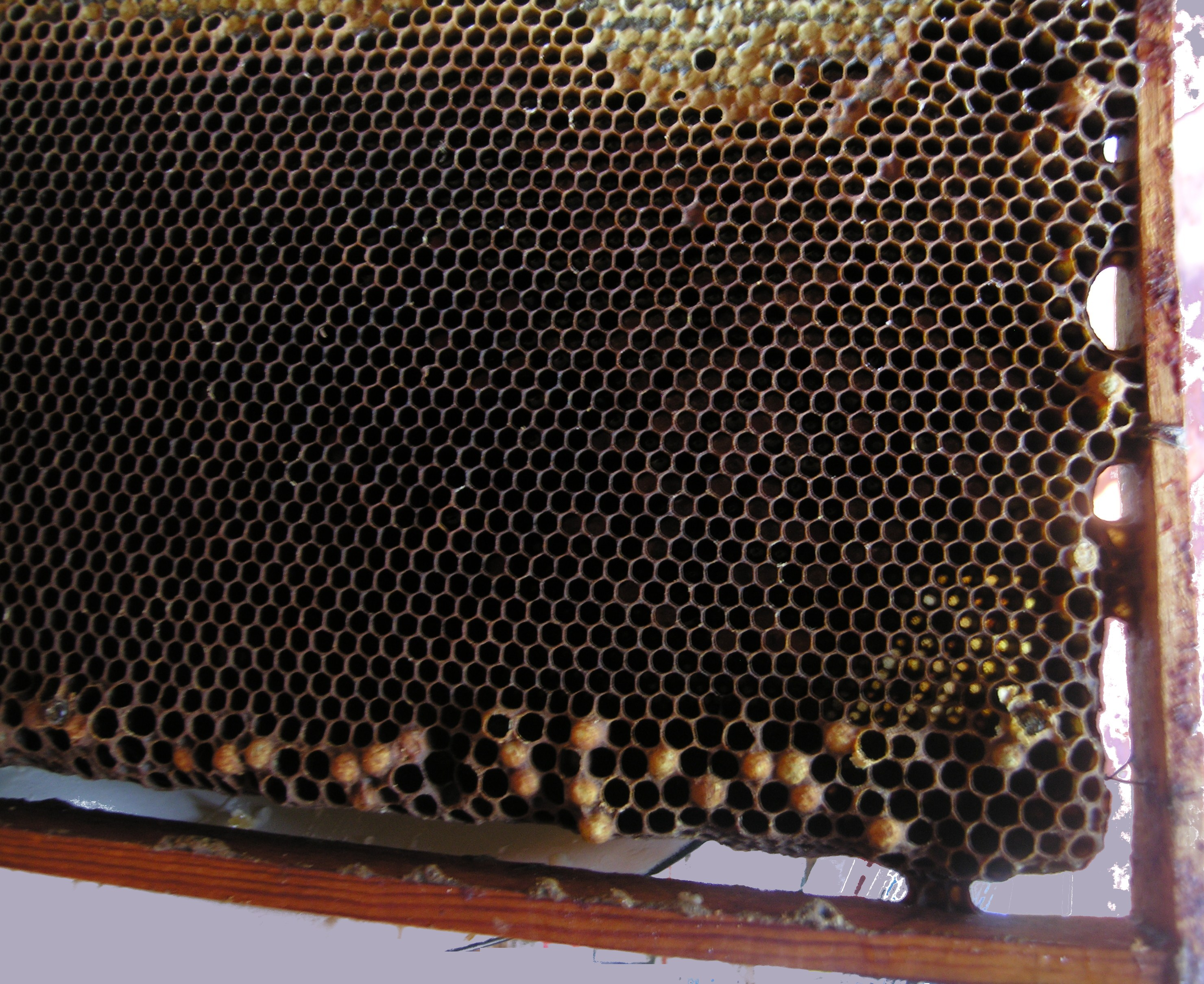
Laying worker bee honeycomb. See broad pattern and drone brood in worker cells (caps protruding). This honeycomb is taken from the dying family without the queen.

A laying worker bee is a worker bee that lays unfertilized eggs, usually in the absence of a queen bee. Only drones develop from the eggs of laying worker bees (with some exceptions, see thelytoky). A beehive cannot survive with only a laying worker bee.

== Prevalence ==
Even in a normal hive, about 1% of workers have ovaries developed enough to lay eggs. However the usual number of the laid eggs is very small. Only eight eggs (seven moderately and one fully developed) were found after examining 10,634 worker bees (strong colony contains about 100,000). Workers eventually lay significant numbers of eggs only in queenless colonies.

== Development ==
Laying workers develop in the absence of open brood as produced by a healthy adult queen. Normally, pheromones from the brood – known as brood recognition pheromones – prevent development of the workers' ovaries. Laying workers can develop after the colony's queen has been lost to swarming, or in the presence of a failing queen which has yet to be superseded. The process of developing a laying worker usually takes weeks after the loss of the original queen. In adult laying workers there is an anatomic (and physiological) trade-off between the sizes of their more developed ovaries and their less developed food glands.
