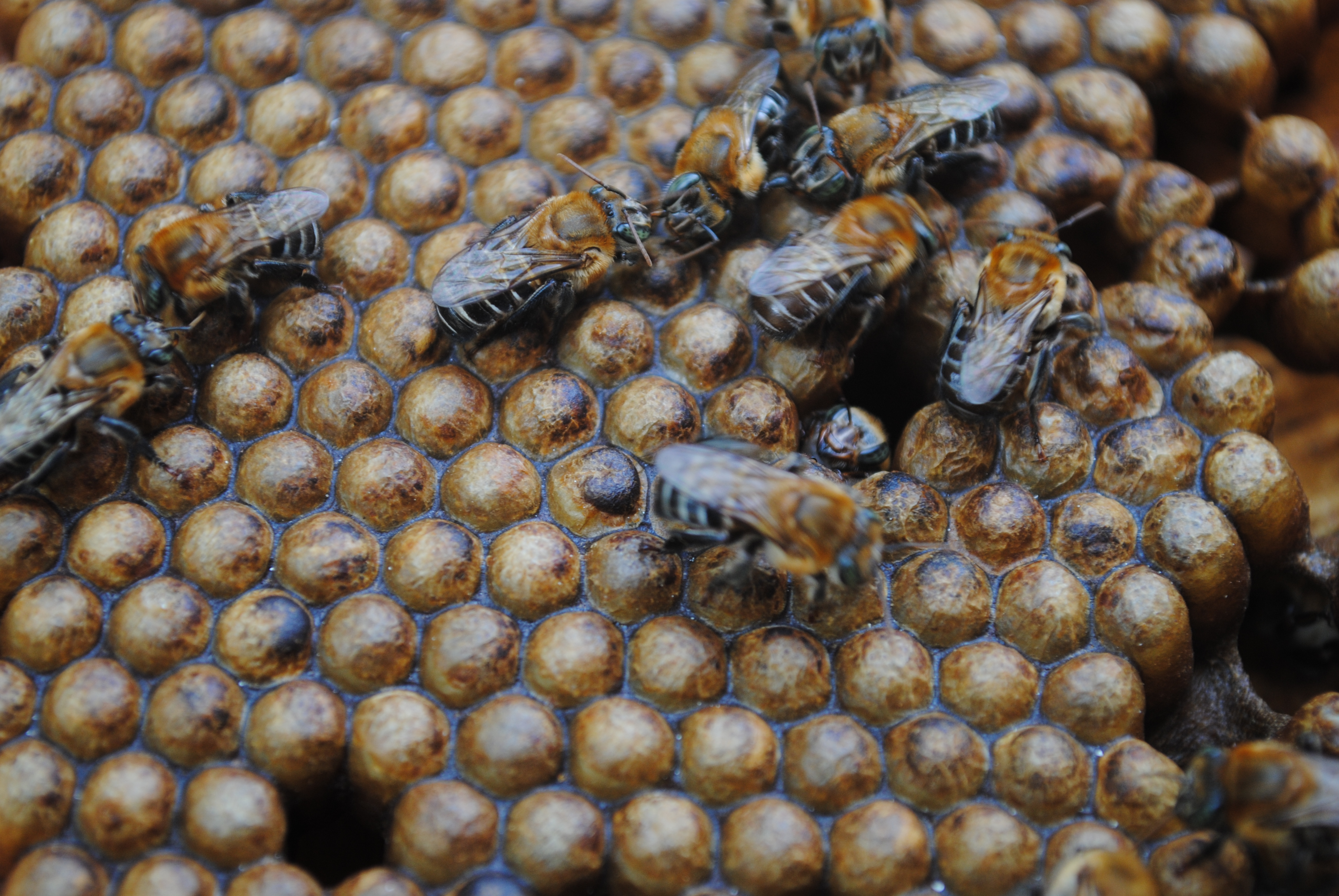

Scientific classification
- Kingdom: Animalia
- Phylum: Arthropoda
- Clade: Pancrustacea
- Class: Insecta
- Order: Hymenoptera
- Family: Apidae
- Genus: Melipona
- Species: M. scutellaris

Binomial name
- Melipona scutellaris Latreille, 1811
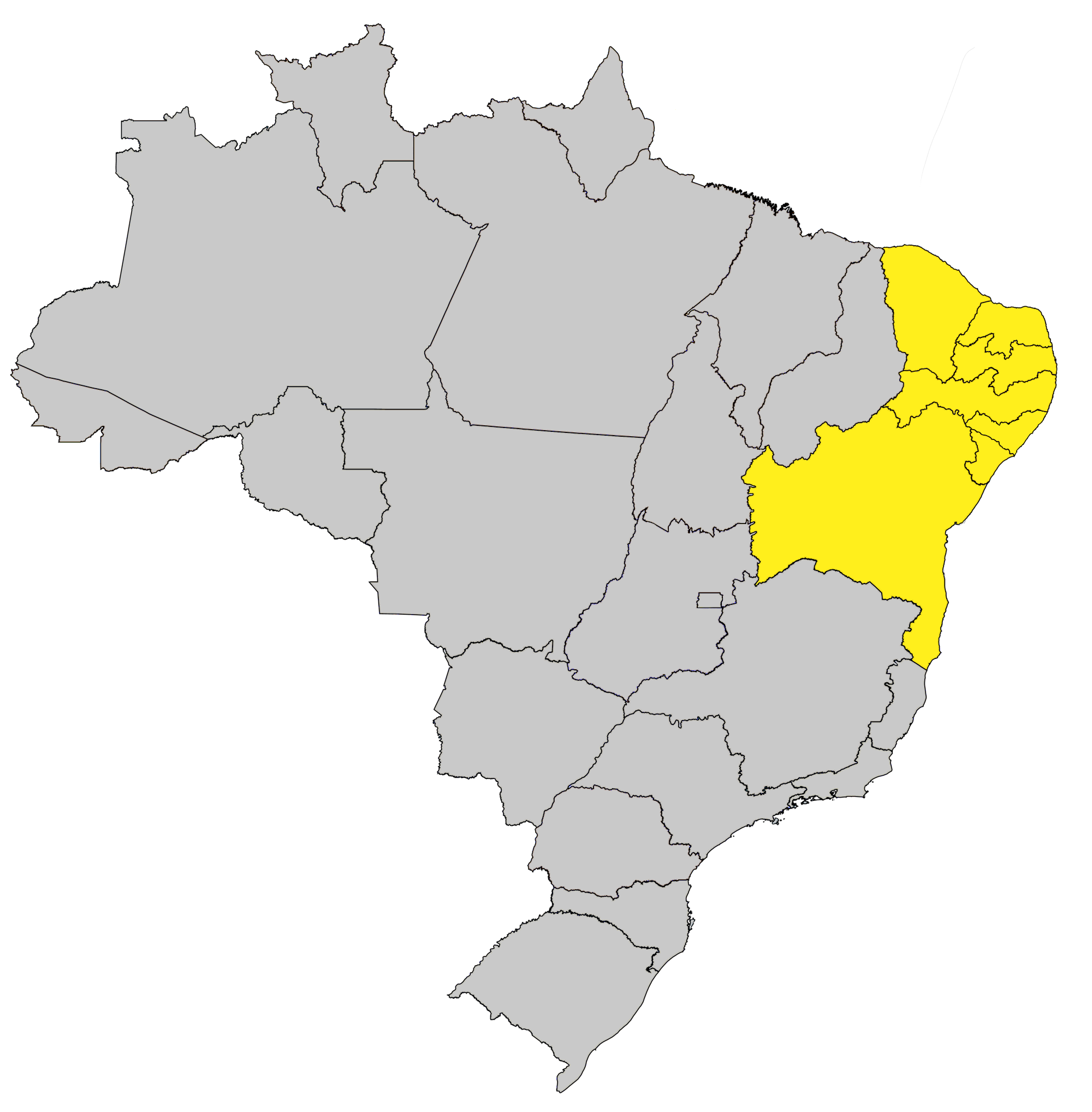
- Range of M. scutellaris in Brazil

= Melipona scutellaris =

Species of bee

Melipona scutellaris is a eusocial stingless bee species of the order Hymenoptera and the genus Melipona. It is considered to be the reared Melipona species with the largest distribution in the North and Northeast regions of Brazil, with records from Rio Grande do Norte down to Bahia. Its common name, Uruçu, comes from the Tupi "eiru su", which in this indigenous language means "big bee". Their honey is highly desirable and the materials they create for nests have been proven to be a promising source of antibiofilm agents and to present selectivity against human cancer cell lines at low concentrations compared to normal cells.

== Taxonomy ==
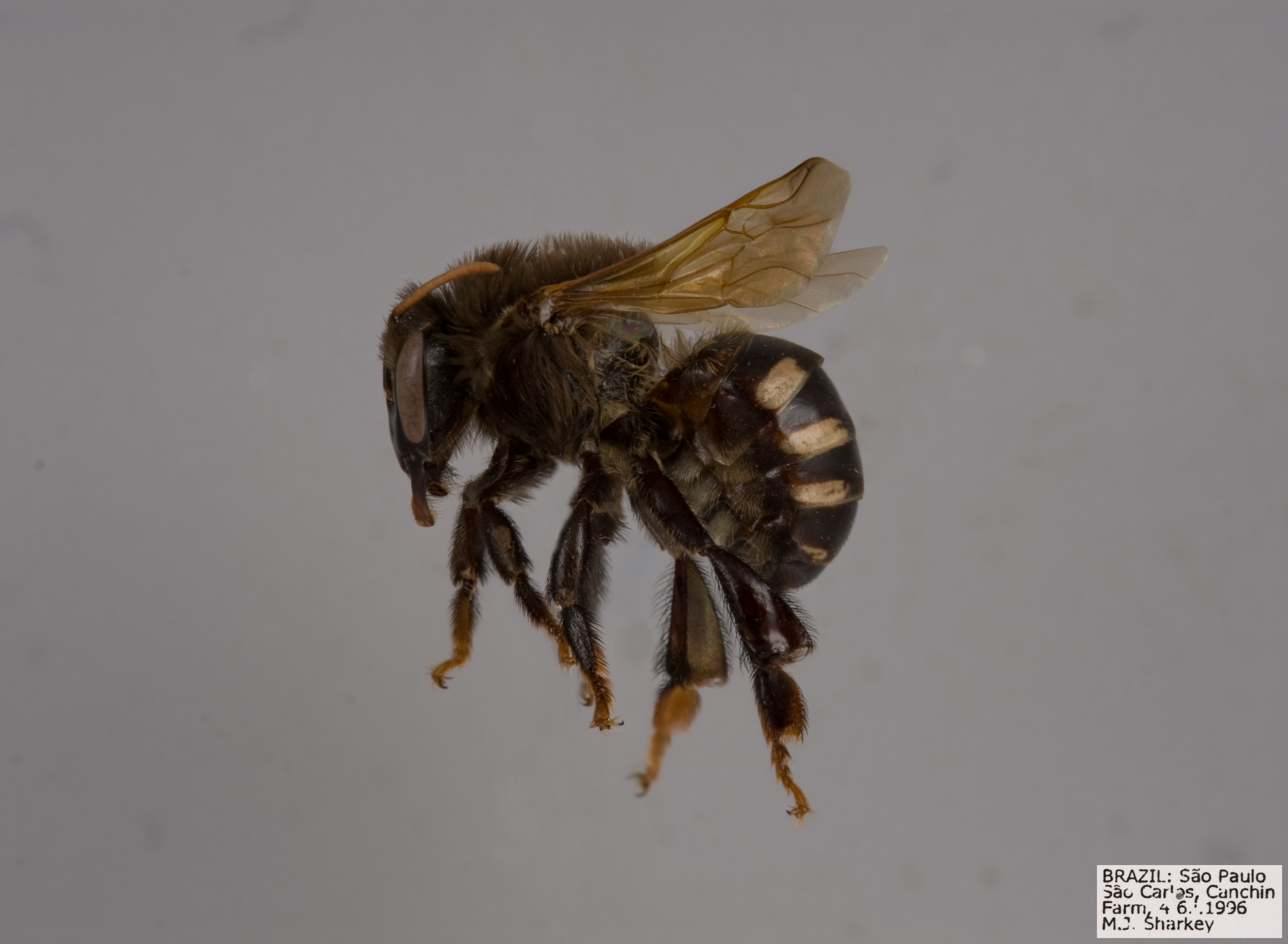
Genus Melipona female

M. scutellaris is a member of the family Apidae of eusocial bees within the order Hymenoptera, which consists of ants, bees, wasps, and sawflies. The subfamily Meliponini is commonly referred to as "stingless bees". It is one of 40 known species within the genus Melipona. M. scutellaris has the common name of "uruçu-nordestina" (northeast uruçu) or "uruçu-verdadeira" (true uruçu), usually shortened to just "uruçu".

== Description ==
M. scutellaris workers of populations from different elevations show morphological differences. Workers from coastal colonies have a dark thorax, while workers from mountainous regions have a light thorax, both having five white stripes and grey hairs. This variation is associated with the humidity in those areas which influences the pigmentation. Its body is robust, the clypeus is slightly convex, and the face is relatively narrow. They are about 10 to 12 mm in length.

M. scutellaris was one of the first bee species domesticated by Potiguara, Kiriri, Xucuru, Pataxó, Paiaku, Tupicuruba and Aymoré peoples. The Portuguese colonizers learned rearing techniques that led M. scutellaris to become one of the most frequently reared species of stingless bees in the Northeast.

Their colonies can have from 4000 to 6000 bees, and in favorable conditions can produce up to 10 liters of honey a year. This makes the species very attractive for commercial honey production, despite the extra work to collect the honey from the pots it is stored avoiding contamination.

== Distribution and habitat ==
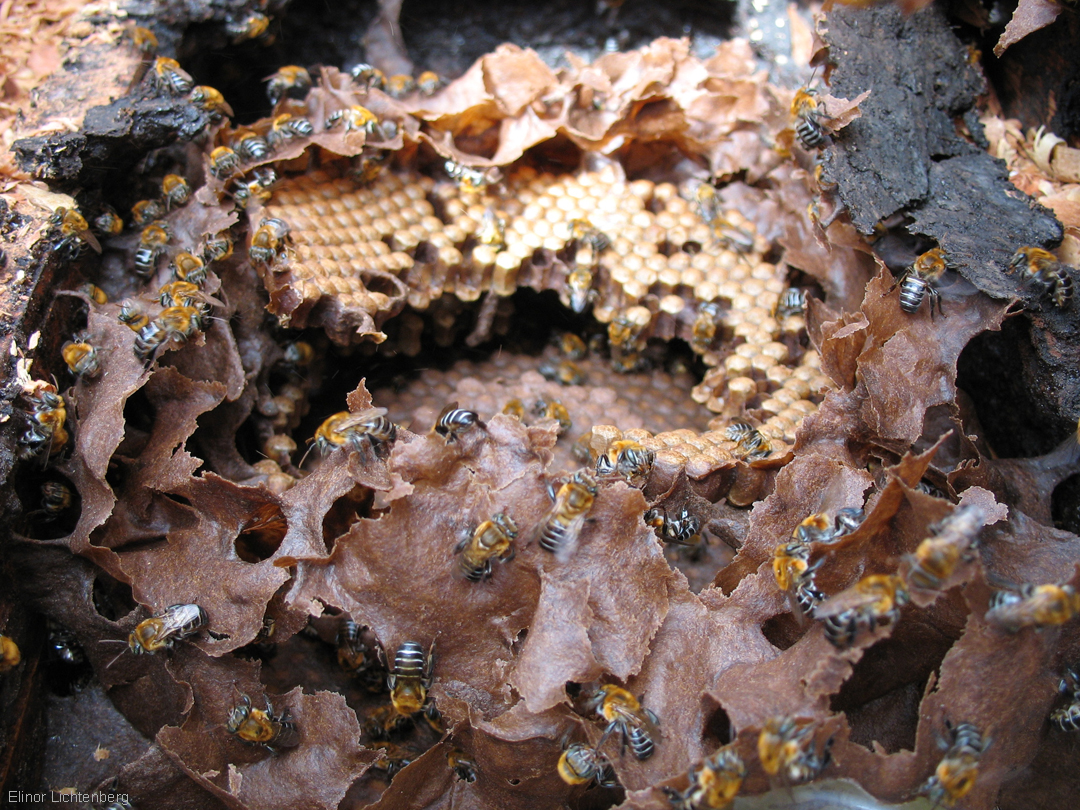
Melipona scutellaris nest

M. scutellaris nests in cavities of tree trunks in the Atlantic rainforest and is widely distributed in the Northeast of Brazil, where it is commonly kept by regional and traditional beekeepers for honey, pollen and wax. To construct their nests, M. scutellaris use cerumen, a mixture of wax and floral resins. Ceruman is used in different ratios in storage pots, brood cells, entrance openings and tubes, and pillars. The nests are surrounded and protected by a structure called batumen, a wall-like plate made of brittle ceruman, mud, and sometimes pieces of flowers and leaves. When excessive mud is added, the mixture is called "geopropolis".

The species is now extremely rare in nature because of the deforestation of the Atlantic Rainforest for sugar cane plantations. Other bee species, such as Tetragonisca angustula, are also greatly affected by this deforestation. Destructive exploitation of wild colonies to obtain the valuable honey, which is traditionally used as medicine, has further reduced natural colonies dramatically.

== Colony cycle ==
Like honey bees, stingless bees form perennial, swarm-founded colonies. M. scutellaris colonies typically contain around 1500 workers and are headed by a single, once-mated queen. Workers, gynes, and males are reared individually in similar-sized cells filled with larval food and are sealed by workers immediately after an egg is laid. In Melipona, queens may be reared in both royal cells and small cells. Queens reared in small cells, referred to as virgin queens, are smaller than normal queens because they emerge from brood cells in which normally only workers and males are reared. Just like normal queens, virgin queens can successfully mate and head colonies. Virgin queens and workers are produced in identically sized cells, and are typically produced greatly in excess of colony needs.

=== Life expectancy ===
The development time from egg to adult is about 40 days. M. scutellaris workers have an average life expectancy of only 31 days while reproductive workers have an average life expectancy of 110 days, 3.5 times longer than a normal worker. The long life expectancy of reproductive workers is most likely linked to the fact that they do not carry out risky or energetically costly tasks such as foraging like normal workers. The queen has the longest life expectancy of around 175 days.

== Behavior ==
=== Caste determination ===
Caste determination in stingless bees is still not fully understood. There are two main theories of determination, and there is not enough conclusive data to establish which one is correct for M. scutellaris. One theory stipulates that female larvae have the potential of following diverse pathways in development. Workers build royal cells for queens, but queens may also emerge from normal cells where males and workers emerge from. Royal cells contain more food for the larvae, while the normal cells do not. In the normal cells, the larvae ingest less food and are therefore of smaller size and labeled as "miniature" or "virgin" queens. The other theory formulates that during development, female larvae have the decision of becoming a worker or a queen and therefore have the power of self-determination. The miniature queens would still gain a higher pay-off being a small queen rather than a worker. They then have the potential to be selected by the workers as the next queen when the active queen dies.

=== Social parasitism ===
On many occasions, virgin M. scutellaris queens avoid being killed by the workers and abandon their own nests. During their escape, they are able to identify and invade other colonies that have been orphaned by the death of their original queen, the mother of the other bees in the colony. These invasions usually occur around sunset, when the workers guarding the nest entrance are less alert. During the day, there is intense movement as bees bring pollen and nectar into the hive, and many workers remain alert as they guard the entrance to the colony to prevent theft of their food stores. It is difficult to penetrate the blockade. But at the end of afternoon, when the search for food slows down and the light diminishes, their vigilance wanes, and parasite queens take advantage of the inattentiveness. Through this stealthy strategy, bees without a queen-right act as social parasites: they are able to take advantage of unrelated workers and benefit from their work.

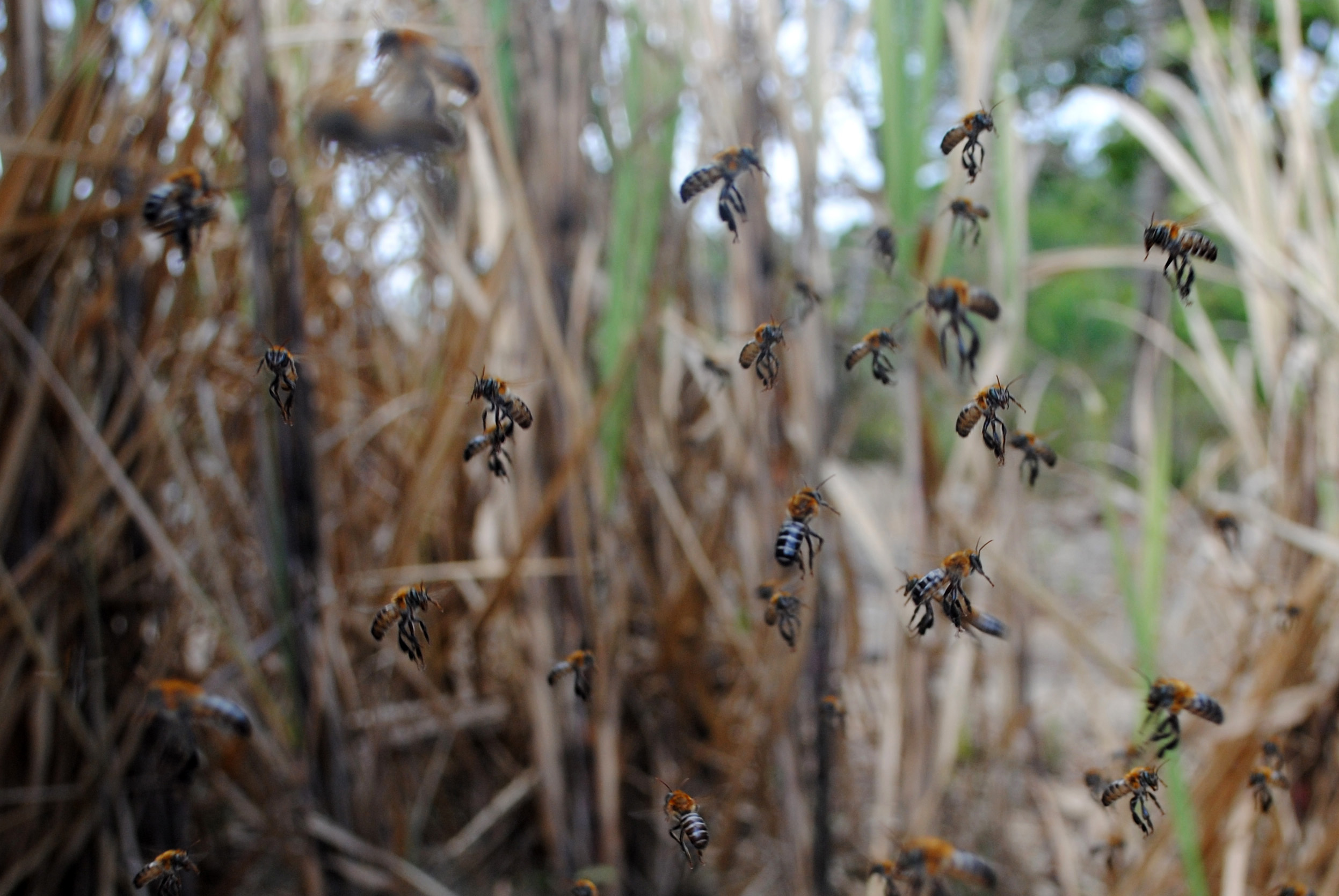
M. scutellaris flying

=== Communication ===
Foraging M. scutellaris motivate collecting bees to search for food at random by a "jostling run" where they bump into other workers. The number of jostles for a forager correlated with the number of collecting bees but do not correlate to the distance or direction. M. scutellaris foragers inform their nestmates adequately about the direction of the food source, but their information on distance is poor and limited. Recruited bees leave the hive in the direction communicated by the forager and search for a food source that smells like the sample taken to the hive. It is still not known exactly how they communicate the source's location. Guiding flights and scent marking have been excluded as communication methods by studies.

=== Role differentiation ===
M. scutellaris is haplodiploid, meaning that females have two sets of chromosomes (diploid), receiving one set from the queen and the other from a male drone. Meanwhile, male drones have one set of chromosomes (haploid), resulting from an unfertilized egg. The male bee's genetic makeup is therefore derived entirely from the mother, while the genetic makeup of the female worker bee is derived half from the mother, and half from the father. If a queen bee mates with one drone, any of her daughters will share about 3/4 of their genes.

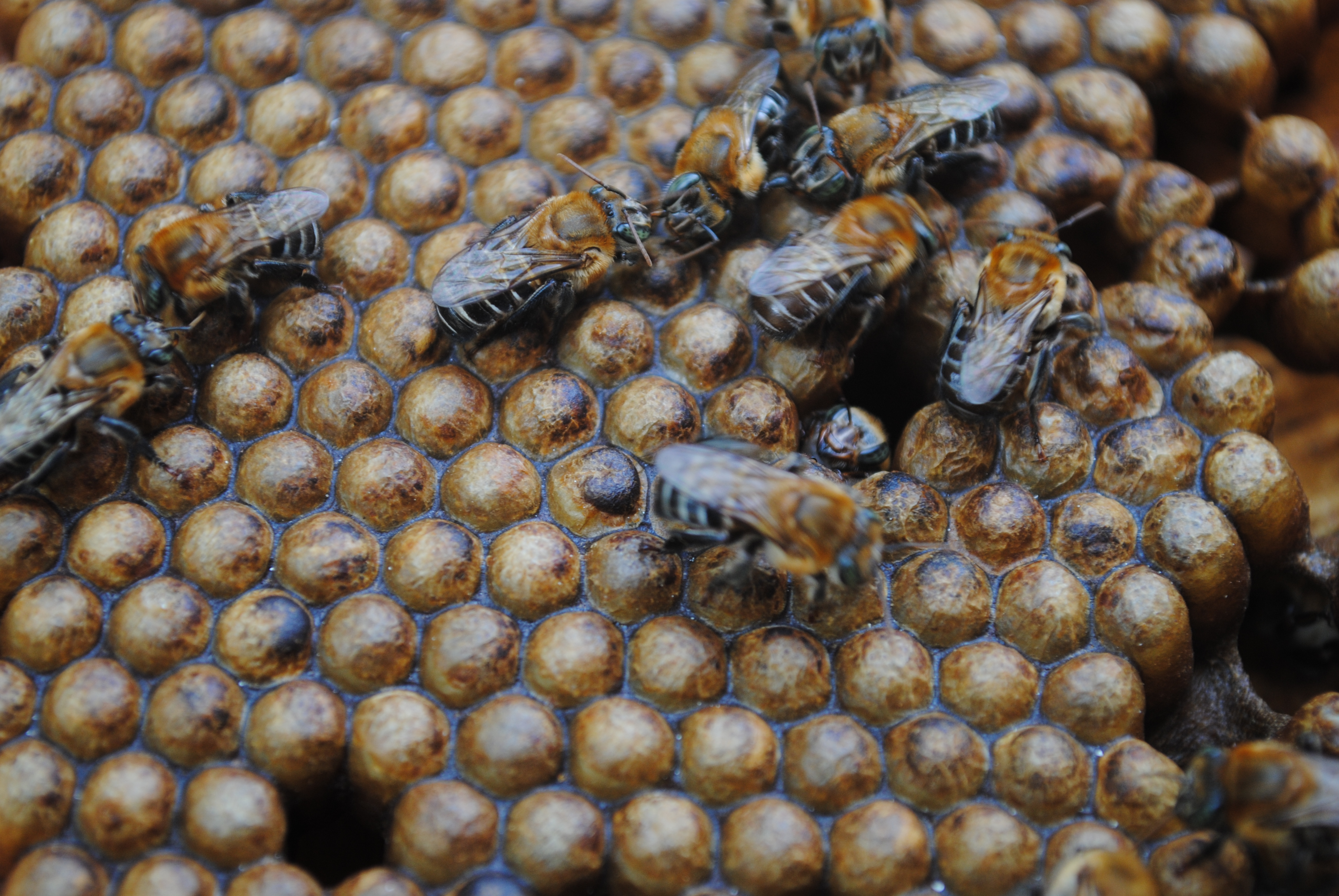
M. scutellaris workers

While workers can lay unfertilized eggs which become their sons, the haplodiploid sex-determination system increases the individual's fitness due to indirect selection. Since the worker is more related to the queen's daughters (her sisters) than to her own offspring, helping the queen's offspring to survive promotes the spreading of the same genes that the worker possesses more efficiently than direct reproduction. Because of this system, the worker M. scutellaris will primarily act as guards of the nest and search for food while the drones and queen stay inside the nest.

=== Defense ===
M. scutellaris have atrophied stingers, so they cannot be used for their defense. Instead, they will defend by biting their predators. During the day, 1 or 2 bees will act as guards and hover at the nest entrance. They will periodically switch duties with other males.

The species is quite tame. It only attacks humans when their nests are molested. The aggressive behavior lasts only for a few minutes, and after that the bees calm down and do not try to bite anymore. Thus, beekeepers usually do not wear any special protection when working with the hives to inspect health, collect honey or duplicate the colony.

== Kinship ==
A queen can be excluded as mother of a worker-produced male because the worker can transmit genes to her son that the queen does not possess. However, workers cannot be excluded as possible mothers of queen-produced males because any allele transmitted by the queen to her son will also have been transmitted to workers. It has been shown that workers contribute significantly to male production.

M. scutellaris shows immediate discriminative responses towards nestmates compared to others that are not members of their colony. They do this through the recognition of species- and colony-specific hydrocarbons. It has been hypothesized that at the nest entrance, M. scutellaris guards assess the scents of others attempting to enter and will not let them pass if they lack the correct colony scent.

== Human use ==
=== Honey ===
The honey of M. scutellaris bees can be produced up to 10 liters per year per colony, in good times, though the average is 2.5 to 4 liters per year per colony. It is mainly considered medicinal by regional populations. The honey may have antimicrobial properties to be used for treating wounds and burns, as first reported in 1892. Its supposed antimicrobial activity may be due to high osmolarity. Because of the high water content, it should be stored in the refrigerator when not consumed immediately.

=== Geopropolis ===
Geopropolis collected by M. scutellaris display antimicrobial and antiproliferative activity. It has also been proven to be a promising source of antibiofilm agents and to present selectivity against human cancer cell lines at low concentrations compared to normal cells. Its chemical composition appears to be essentially nonpolar. The characteristics shown by chemical analyses suggest the presence of benzophenones as active compounds. Therefore, geopropolis seems to be a promising natural product to be thoroughly studied in order to reveal new molecules with therapeutic properties. Since its chemical profile has not been fully described and its pharmacological potential has just begun to be unveiled, it needs further investigation.
