= Queen retinue pheromone =

Type of honey bee pheromones

Queen retinue pheromones (QRP) are a type of honey bee pheromones, so-called because one of their behavioral effects is to attract a circle of bees (a “retinue”) around the queen.

In older literature, the queen pheromone is called mandibular pheromone because some of its components were first identified from the mandibular glands of queens. Retinue pheromone may be more accurate because the chemical mix in the pheromone comes from several glands.

The following compounds have been identified as present in the QRP, of which, only coniferyl alcohol is found in the mandibular glands. The combination of the five QMP compounds and the four compounds below helps create the retinue attraction of worker bees around their queen.

- Methyl oleate
- Coniferyl alcohol
- Hexadecan-1-ol
- Alpha-linolenic acid
