= Queen bee =

Egg-laying individual in a bee colony

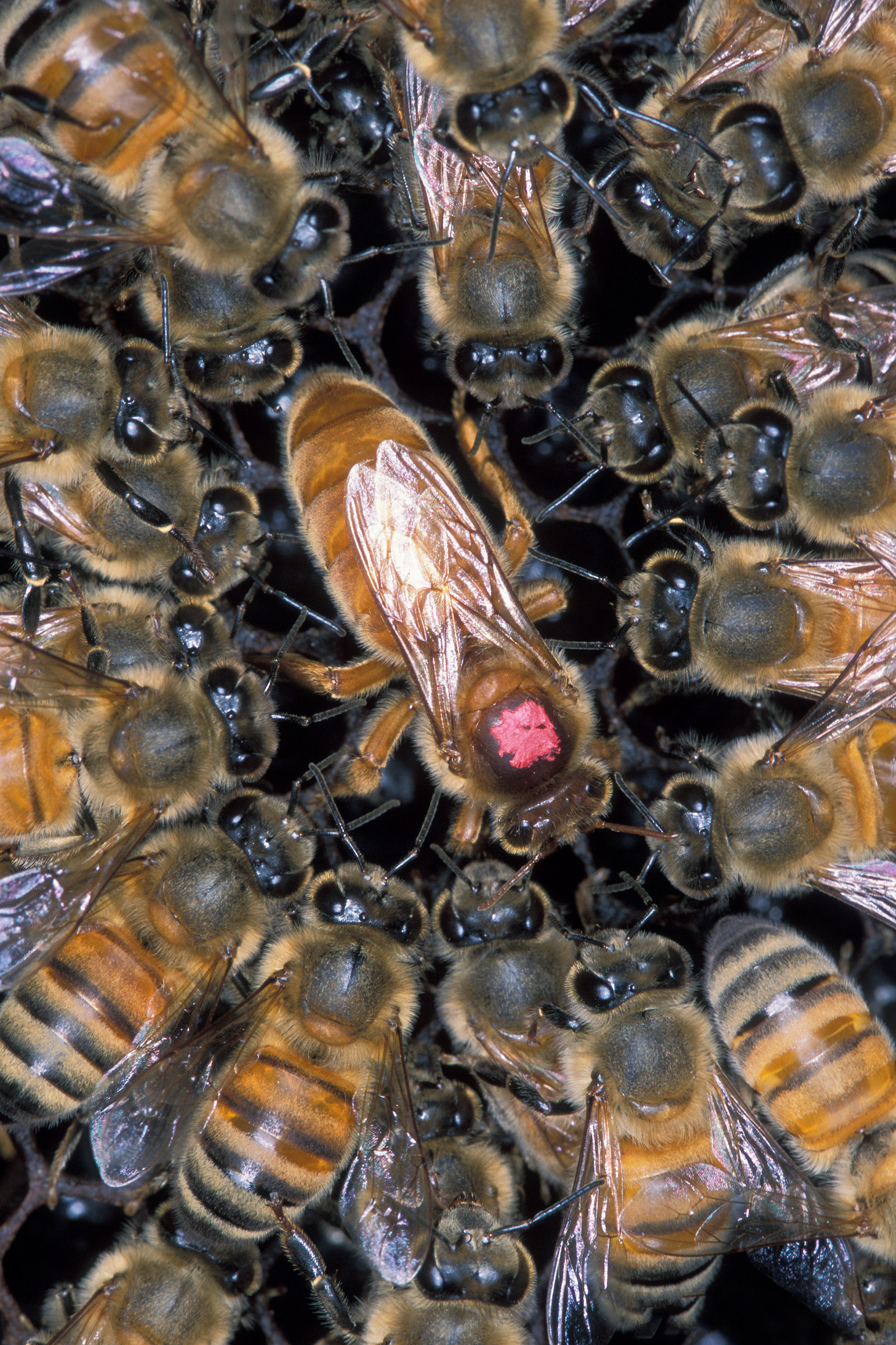
Queen (marked) surrounded by Africanized workers

A queen bee is typically an adult, mated female (gyne) that lives in a colony or hive of honey bees. With fully developed reproductive organs, the queen is usually the mother of most, if not all, of the bees in the beehive. Queens are developed from larvae selected by worker bees and specially fed in order to become sexually mature. There is normally only one adult, mated queen in a hive, in which case the bees will usually follow and fiercely protect her.

The term "queen bee" can be more generally applied to any dominant reproductive female in a colony of a eusocial bee species other than honey bees. However, as in the Brazilian stingless bee (Schwarziana quadripunctata), a single nest may have multiple queens or even dwarf queens, ready to replace a dominant queen in case of a sudden death.

== Development ==
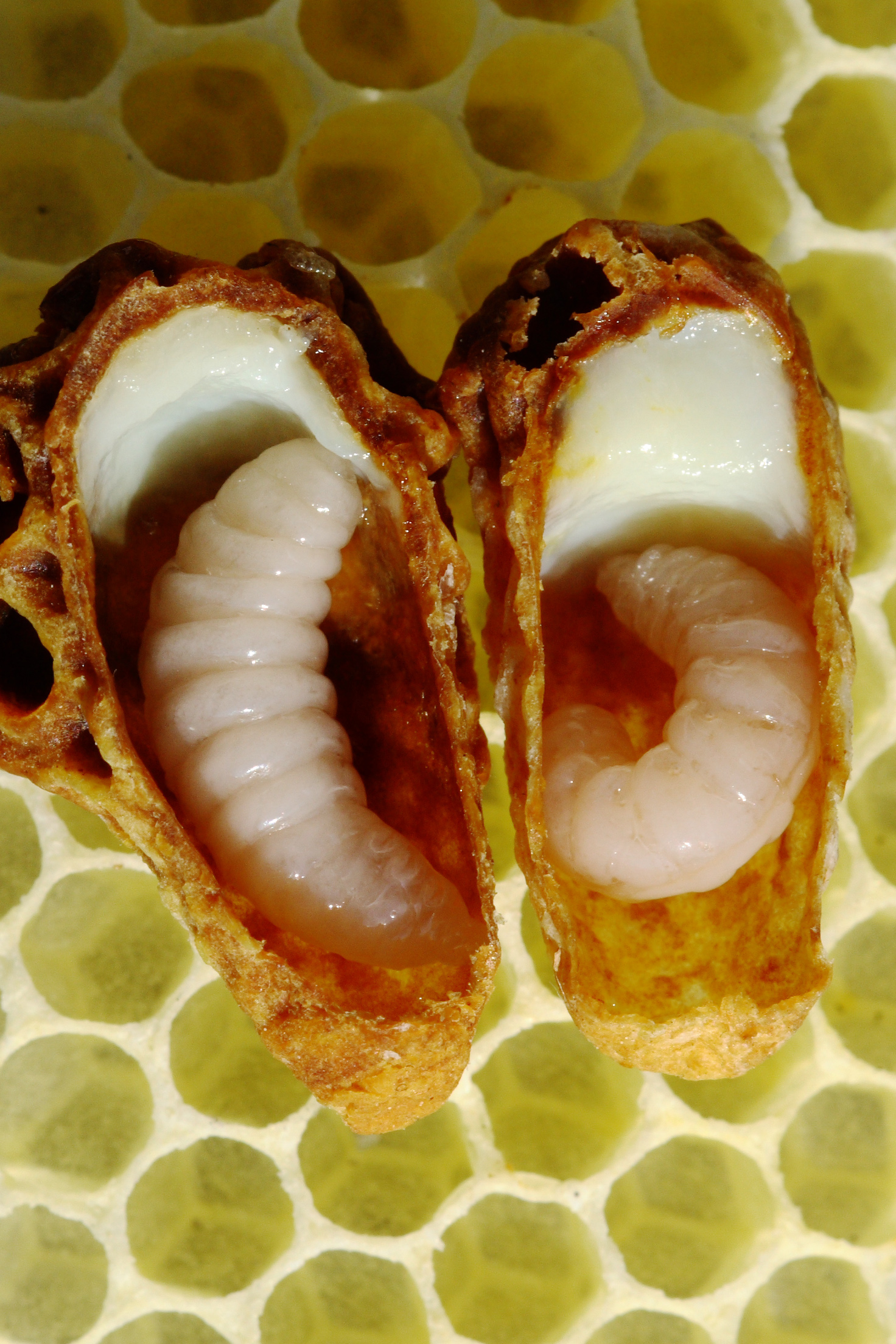
Older queen larvae in queen cell lying on top of wax comb

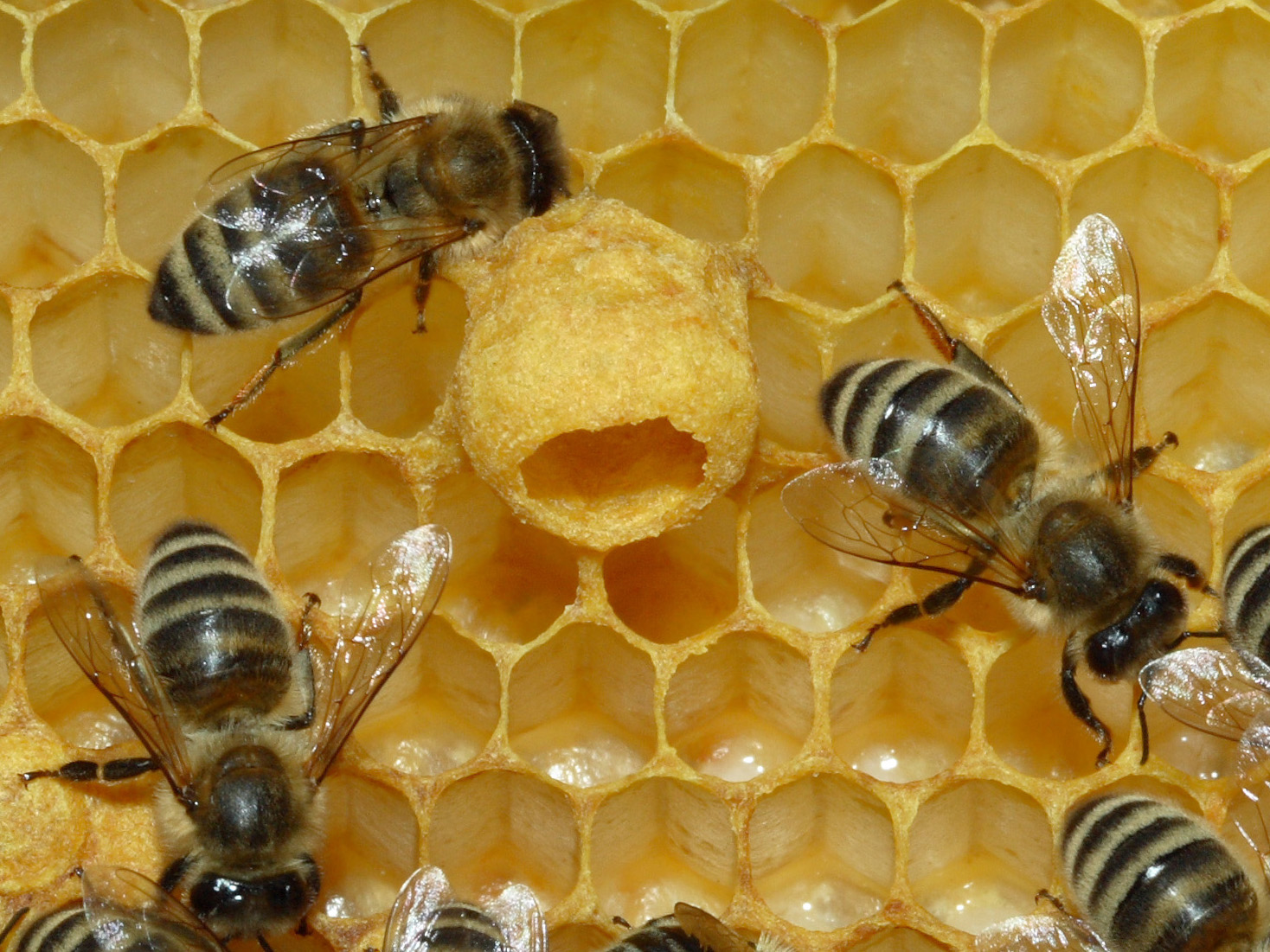
A queen cup

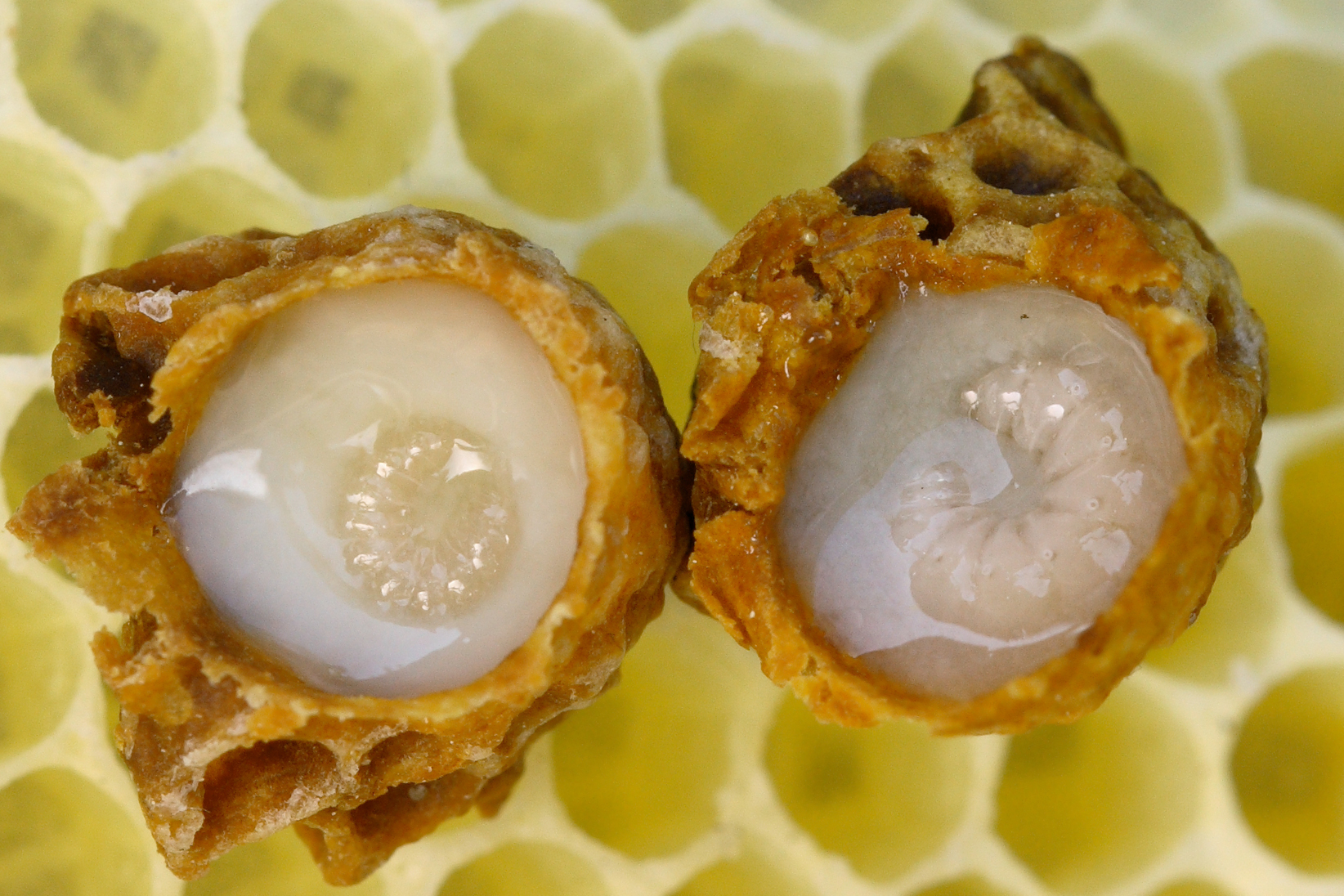
Queen larvae floating on royal jelly in opened queen cups laid on top of wax comb

During the warm parts of the year, female "worker" bees leave the hive every day to collect nectar and pollen. While male bees serve no architectural or pollinating purpose, their primary function (if they are healthy enough) is to mate with a queen bee. If they are successful, they fall to the ground and die after copulation. Any fertilized egg has the potential to become a queen. Diet in the larval stage determines whether the bee will develop into a queen or a worker. Queens are fed only royal jelly, a protein-rich secretion from glands on the heads of young workers. Worker larvae are fed bee bread which is a mixture of nectar and pollen. All bee larvae are fed some royal jelly for the first few days after hatching but only queen larvae are fed the jelly exclusively. As a result of the difference in diet, the queen will develop into a sexually mature female, unlike the worker bees.

Queens are raised in specially constructed queen cells. The fully constructed queen cells have a peanut-like shape and texture. Queen cells start out as queen cups, which are larger than the cells of normal brood comb and are oriented vertically instead of horizontally. Worker bees will only further build up the queen cup once the queen has laid an egg in a queen cup. In general, the old queen starts laying eggs into queen cups when conditions are right for swarming or supersedure. Swarm cells hang from the bottom of a frame while supersedure queens or emergency queens are generally raised in cells built out from the face of a frame.

As the young queen larva pupates with her head down, the workers cap the queen cell with beeswax. When ready to emerge, the virgin queen will chew a circular cut around the cap of her cell. Often the cap swings open when most of the cut is made, appearing like a hinged lid.

During swarming season, the old queen is likely to leave with the prime swarm before the first virgin queen emerges from a queen cell.

== Virgin queen bee ==
Metamorphosis of the queen bee
Egg	hatches on day 3
Larva (several moltings)	day 3 to day 8 1/2
Queen cell capped	c. day 7 1/2
Pupa	c. day 8 until emergence
Emergence	c. day 15 1/2 – day 17
Nuptial flight(s)	c. day 20 – 24
Egg laying	c. day 23 and up

A virgin queen is a queen bee that has not mated with a drone. Virgins are intermediate in size between workers and mated, laying queens, and are much more active than the latter. They are hard to spot while inspecting a frame, because they run across the comb, climbing over worker bees if necessary, and may even take flight if sufficiently disturbed. Virgin queens can often be found clinging to the walls or corners of a hive during inspections.

Virgin queens appear to have little queen pheromone and often do not appear to be recognized as queens by the workers. A virgin queen in her first few hours after emergence can be placed into the entrance of any queenless hive or nuc and acceptance is usually very good, whereas a mated queen is usually recognized as a stranger and runs a high risk of being killed by the older workers.

When a young virgin queen emerges from a queen cell, she will generally seek out virgin queen rivals and attempt to kill them. Virgin queens will quickly find and kill (by stinging) any other emerged virgin queen (or be dispatched themselves), as well as any unemerged queens. Queen cells that are opened on the side indicate that a virgin queen was likely killed by a rival virgin queen. When a colony remains in swarm mode after the prime swarm has left, the workers may prevent virgins from fighting and one or several virgins may go with after-swarms. Other virgins may stay behind with the remnant of the hive. Some virgins have been seen to escape the hive to avoid being killed and seek out another without a queen, such as in the eusocial bee Melipona scutellaris. This can contain multiple virgin queens. When the after-swarm settles into a new home, the virgins will then resume normal behavior and fight to the death until only one remains. If the prime swarm has a virgin queen and an old queen, the old queen will usually be allowed to live. The old queen continues laying. Within a couple of weeks she will die a natural death and the former virgin, now mated, will take her place.

Unlike the worker bees, the queen's stinger is not barbed and she is able to sting repeatedly without dying.

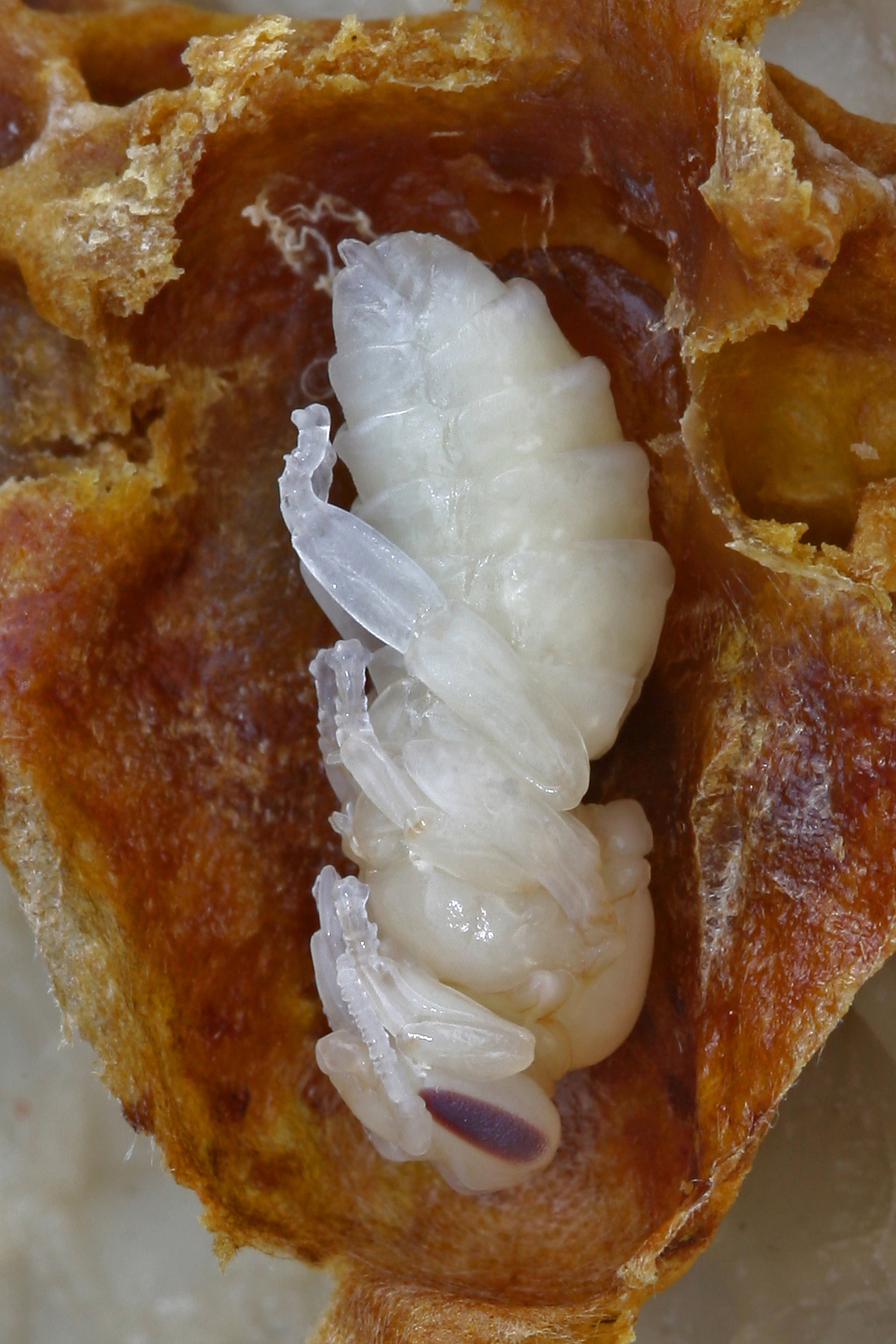
Capped queen cell opened to show queen pupa (with darkening eyes).

=== Piping ===
Piping is a noise made by virgin and mated queen bees during certain times of the virgin queens' development. Fully developed virgin queens communicate through vibratory signals: "quacking" from virgin queens in their queen cells and "tooting" from queens free in the colony, collectively known as piping. A virgin queen may frequently pipe before she emerges from her cell and for a brief time afterwards. Mated queens may briefly pipe after being released in a hive.

Piping is most common when there is more than one queen in a hive. It is postulated that the piping is a form of battle cry announcing to competing queens and show the workers their willingness to fight. It may also be a signal to the worker bees which queen is the most worthwhile to support.

The adult queen pipes for a two-second pulse followed by a series of quarter-second toots. The queens of African bees produce more vigorous and frequent bouts of piping.

== Reproduction cycle ==
The surviving virgin queen will fly out on a sunny, warm day to a drone congregation area where she will mate with 12–15 drones. If the weather holds, she may return to the drone congregation area for several days until she is fully mated. Mating occurs in flight. The young queen stores up to 6 million sperm from multiple drones in her spermatheca. She will selectively release sperm for the remaining 2–7 years of her life.

The young virgin queen has a limited time to mate. If she is unable to fly for several days because of bad weather and remains unmated, she will become a "drone layer." Drone-laying queens usually signal the death of the colony, because the workers have no fertilized (female) larvae from which to raise worker bees or a replacement queen.

Though timing can vary, matings usually take place between the sixth and tenth day after the queen emerges. Egg laying usually begins 2 to 3 days after the queen returns to the beehive, but can start earlier than this.

A special, rare case of reproduction is thelytoky: the reproduction of female workers or queens by laying worker bees by parthenogenesis. Thelytoky occurs in the Cape bee, Apis mellifera capensis, and has been found in other strains at very low frequency.

=== Supersedure ===
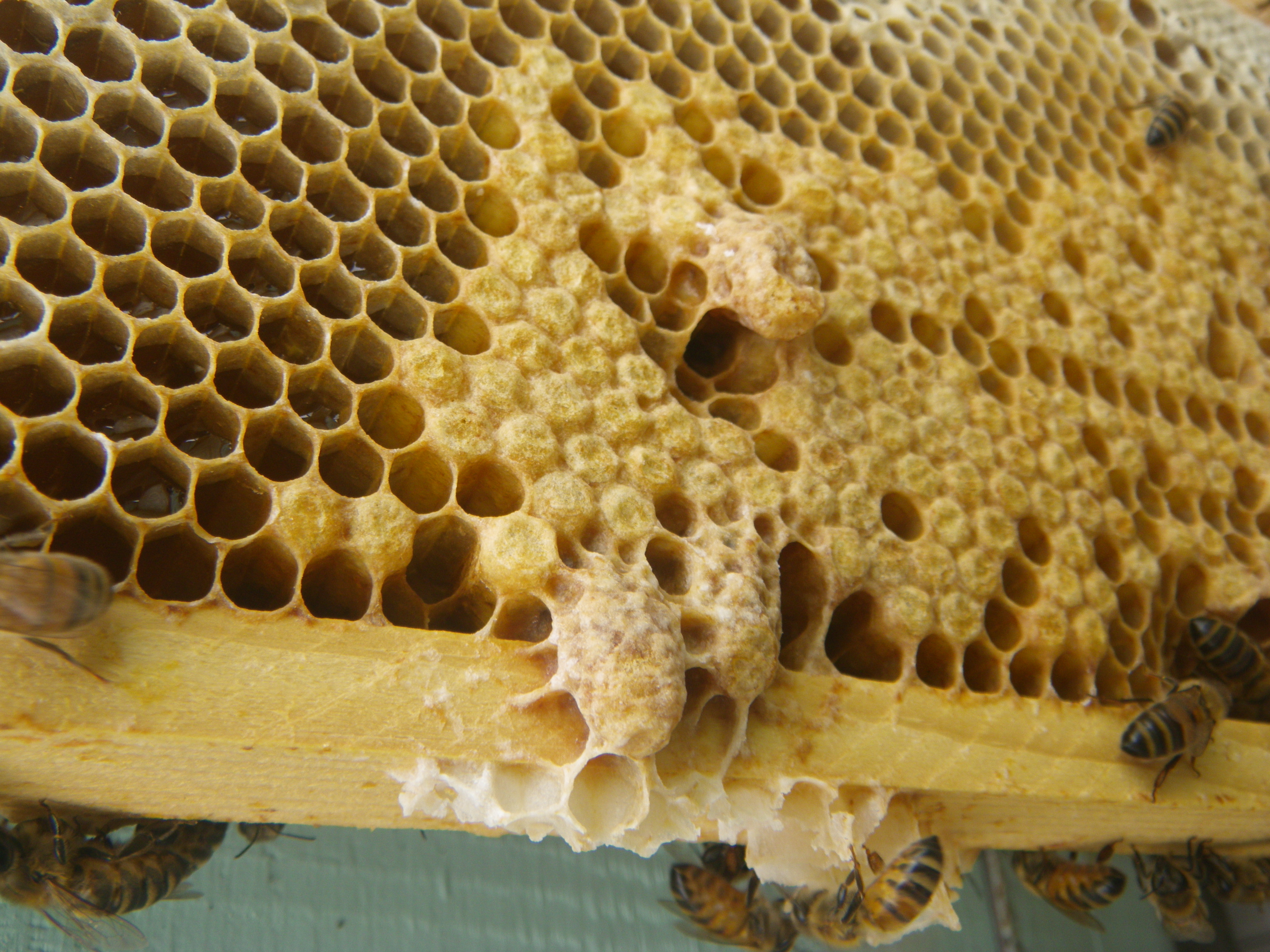
Capped swarm queen cells

As the queen ages, her pheromone output diminishes. A queen bee that becomes old, or is diseased or failing, is replaced by the workers in a procedure known as "supersedure".

Supersedure may be forced by a beekeeper, for example by clipping off one of the queen's middle or posterior legs. This makes her unable to properly place her eggs at the bottom of the brood cell; the workers detect this and then rear replacement queens. When a new queen becomes available, the workers kill the reigning queen by "balling" her, clustering tightly around her. Death through balling is accomplished by surrounding the queen and raising her body temperature, causing her to overheat and die. Balling is often a problem for beekeepers attempting to introduce a replacement queen.

If a queen suddenly dies, the workers will attempt to create an "emergency queen" by selecting several brood cells where a larva has just emerged which are then flooded with royal jelly. The worker bees then build larger queen cells over the normal-sized worker cells which protrude vertically from the face of the brood comb. Emergency queens are usually smaller and less prolific than normal queens.

== Daily life ==
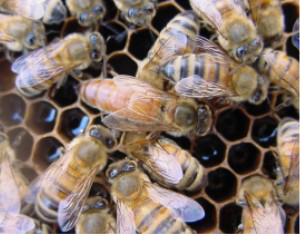
Unmarked queen with attendants.

The primary function of a queen bee is to serve as the reproducer. A well-mated and well-fed queen of quality stock can lay about 1,500 eggs per day during the spring build-up—more than her own body weight in eggs every day. She is continuously surrounded by worker bees who meet her every need, giving her food and disposing of her waste. The attendant workers also collect and then distribute queen mandibular pheromone, a pheromone that inhibits the workers from starting queen cells.

The queen bee is able to control the sex of the eggs she lays. The queen lays a fertilized (female) or unfertilized (male) egg according to the width of the cell. Drones are raised in cells that are significantly larger than the cells used for workers. The queen fertilizes the egg by selectively releasing sperm from her spermatheca as the egg passes through her oviduct.

== Identification ==
Color	Year ends in
white	1 or 6
yellow	2 or 7
red	3 or 8
green	4 or 9
blue	5 or 0

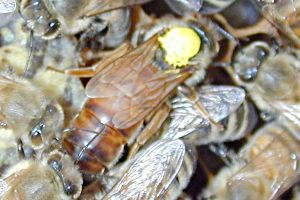
Marked queen

The queen bee's abdomen is longer than the worker bees surrounding her and also longer than a male bee's. Even so, in a hive of 60,000 to 80,000 honey bees, it is often difficult for beekeepers to find the queen with any speed; for this reason, many queens in non-feral colonies are marked with a light daub of paint on their thorax. The paint usually does not harm the queen and makes her easier to find when necessary.

Although the color is sometimes randomly chosen, professional queen breeders use a color that identifies the year a queen hatched, which helps them to decide whether their queens are too old to maintain a strong hive and need to be replaced. The mnemonic taught to assist beekeepers in remembering the color order is Will You Raise Good Bees (white, yellow, red, green, blue).

Sometimes tiny convex disks marked with identification numbers (Opalithplättchen) are used when a beekeeper has many queens born in the same year— a method that can also be used to keep multiple bees in the same hive under observation for research purposes.

== Queen rearing ==
Queen rearing is the process by which beekeepers raise queen bees from young fertilized worker bee larvae. The most commonly used method is known as the Doolittle method. In the Doolittle method, the beekeeper grafts larvae, which are 24 hours or less of age, into a bar of queen cell cups. The queen cell cups are placed inside a cell-building colony. A cell-building colony is a strong, well-fed, queenless colony that feeds the larvae royal jelly and develops the larvae into queen bees.

After approximately 10 days, the queen cells are transferred from the cell building colony to small mating nuclei colonies, which are placed inside of mating yards. The queens emerge from their cells inside of the mating nuclei. After approximately 7–10 days, the virgin queens take their mating flights, mate with 10–20 drone bees, and return to their mating nuclei as mated queen bees.

== See also ==
- Queen ant
- Worker policing
