= Drone (bee) =

Male bee

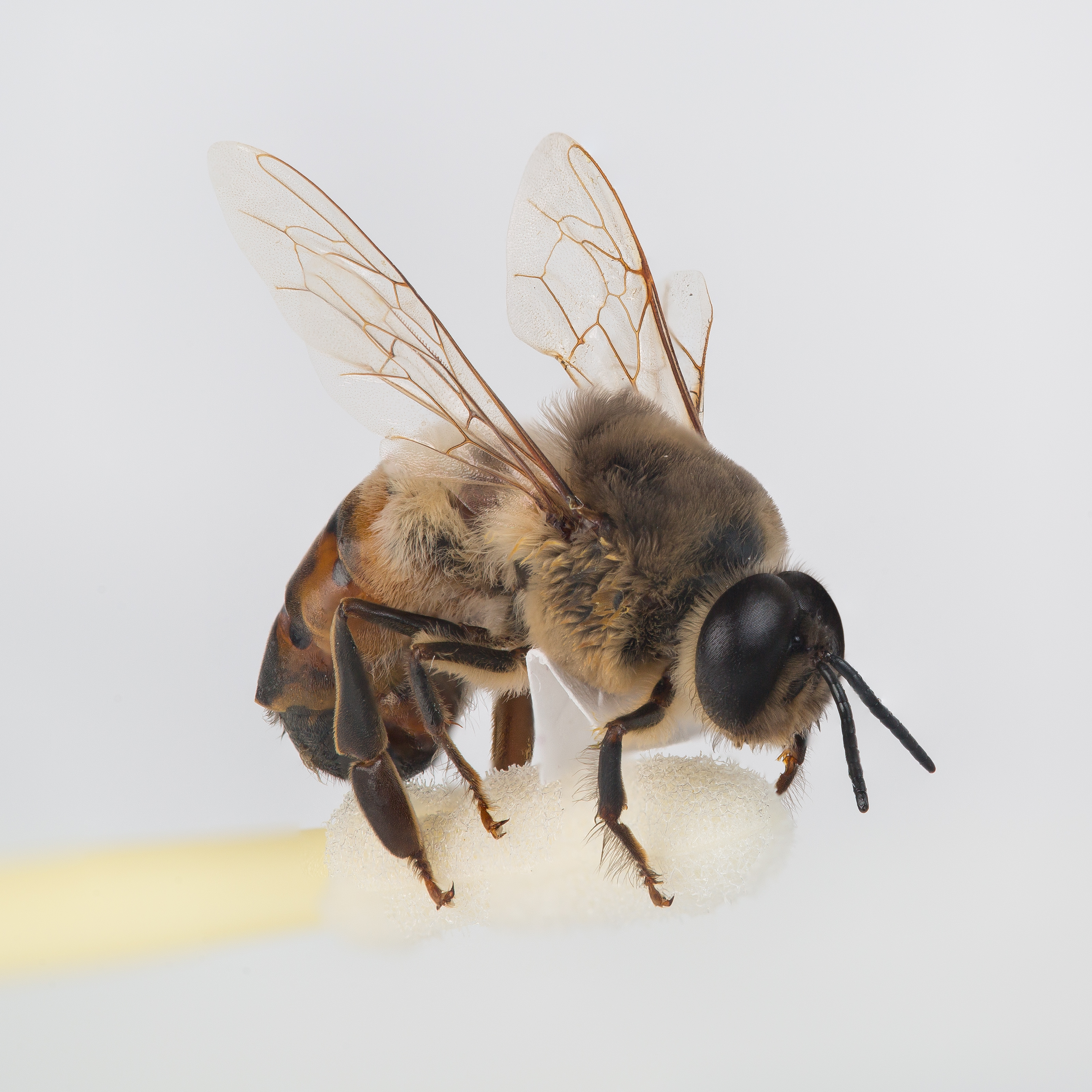
Drone bee

A drone is a male honey bee. Unlike the female worker bee, a drone has no stinger. It does not gather nectar or pollen and cannot feed without assistance from worker bees. Its only role is to mate with a maiden queen in nuptial flight, and often dies after doing so.

== Genetics ==
Drones are haploid, growing from unfertilised eggs by arrhenotoky.

Drones carry only one type of allele at each chromosomal position, because they are haploid (containing only one set of chromosomes from the mother). During the development of eggs within a queen, a diploid cell with 32 chromosomes divides to generate haploid cells called gametes with 16 chromosomes. The result is a haploid egg, with chromosomes having a new combination of alleles at the various loci. This process is called arrhenotokous parthenogenesis or simply arrhenotoky.

Because the male bee technically has only a mother, and no father, their genealogical tree is unusual. The first generation has one member (the male). One generation back also has one member (the mother). Two generations back are two members (the mother and father of the mother). Three generations back are three members. Four back are five members. This sequence – 1, 1, 2, 3, 5, 8, and so on – is the Fibonacci sequence.

Much debate and controversy exists in scientific literature about the dynamics and apparent benefit of the combined forms of reproduction in honey bees and other social insects, known as the haplodiploid sex-determination system. The drones have two reproductive functions: each drone grows from the queen's unfertilized haploid egg and produces some 10 million male sperm cells, each genetically identical to the egg. Drones also serve as a vehicle to mate with a new queen to fertilize her eggs. Female worker bees develop from fertilized eggs and are diploid in origin, which means that the sperm from a father provides a second set of 16 chromosomes for a total of 32: one set from each parent. Since all the sperm cells produced by a particular drone are genetically identical, full sisters are more closely related than full sisters of other animals where the sperm is not genetically identical.

A laying worker bee exclusively produces totally unfertilized eggs, which develop into drones. As an exception to this rule, laying worker bees in some subspecies of honey bees may also produce diploid (and therefore female) fertile offspring in a process called thelytoky, in which the second set of chromosomes comes not from sperm, but from one of the three polar bodies during anaphase II of meiosis.

In honey bees, the genetics of offspring can best be controlled by artificially inseminating (referred to in beekeeping as "instrumental insemination") a queen with drones collected from a single hive, where the drones' mother is known. In the natural mating process, a queen mates with multiple drones, which may not come from the same hive. Therefore, batches of female offspring have fathers of completely different genetic origin.

== Anatomy ==
A drone is characterized by eyes that are twice the size of those of worker bees and queens, and a body size greater than that of worker bees, though usually smaller than the queen bee. His abdomen is stouter than the abdomen of workers or queen. Although heavy bodied, the drone must be able to fly fast enough to accompany the queen in flight. The average flight time for a drone is about 20 minutes.

An Apis cerana colony has about 200 drones during high summer peak time. Drones depend on worker bees to feed them.

Drones die off or are ejected from the hive by the worker bees, which can include the workers clipping the drones' wings, in late autumn, dying from exposure and the inability to protect or feed themselves, and do not reappear in the bee hive until late spring. The worker bees evict them as the drones would deplete the hive's resources too quickly if they were allowed to stay.

== Role ==
The drones' main function is to be ready to fertilize a receptive queen. Drones in a hive do not usually mate with a virgin queen of the same hive because the queen flies further to a drone congregation area than the drones do. Mating generally takes place in or near drone congregation areas. How these areas are selected is not understood, but they do exist. When a drone mates with a queen of the same hive, the resultant queen will have a spotty brood pattern (numerous empty cells on a brood frame) due to the removal of diploid drone larvae by nurse bees (i.e., a fertilized egg with two identical sex genes will develop into a drone instead of a worker). The worker bees remove the inbred brood and consume it to recycle the protein.

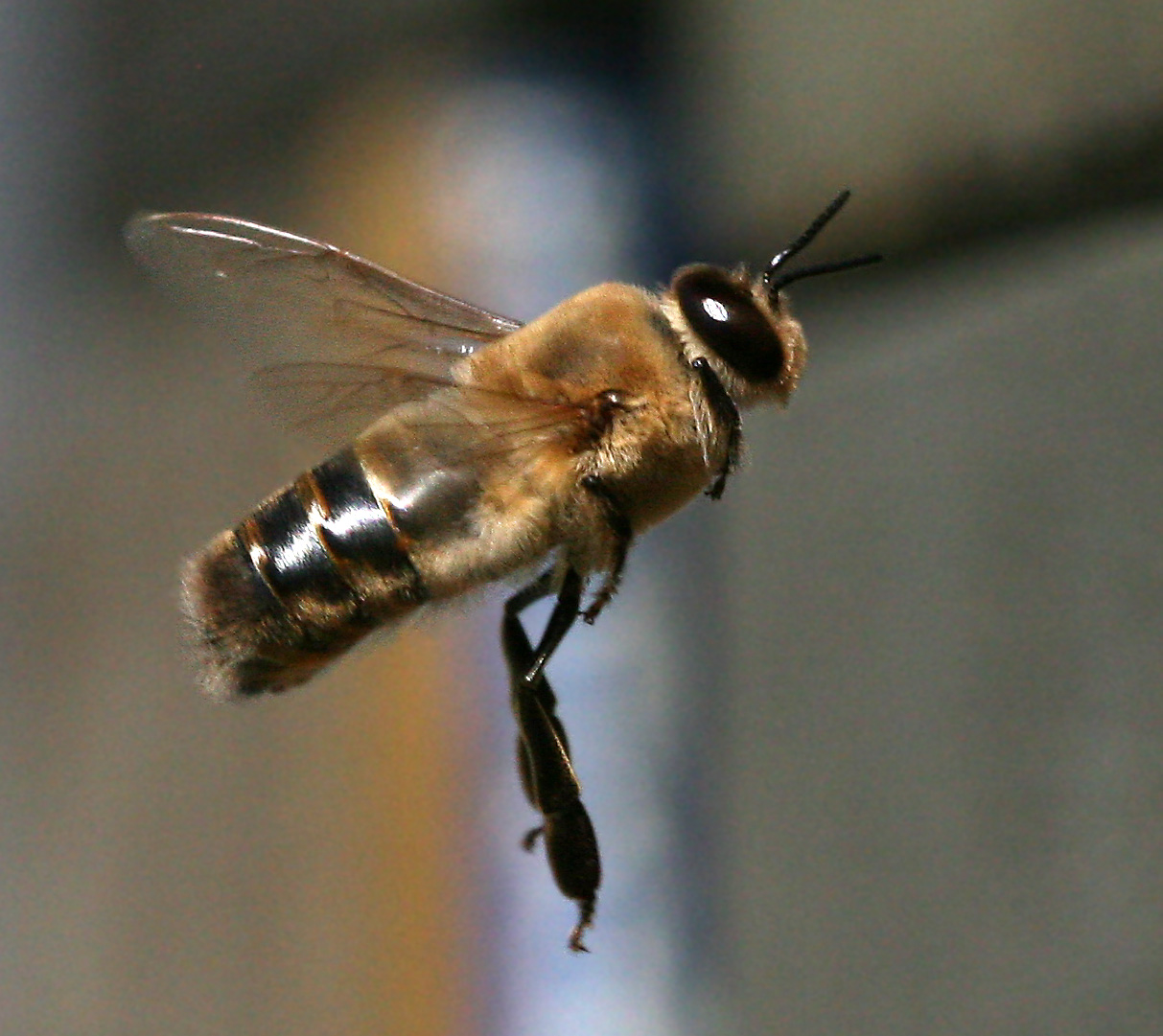
In flight

Mating occurs in flight, which accounts for drones needing better vision, which is provided by their large eyes. Should a drone succeed in mating, the first thing that happens is all of the blood in the drone's body rushes to his endophallus, which causes him to lose control over his entire body. His body falls away, leaving a portion of his endophallus attached to the queen which helps guide the next drone in the queen.

Honey bee queen breeders may breed drones to be used for instrumental insemination or open mating. A queen mating yard must have many drones to be successful.

In areas with severe winters, all drones are driven out of the hive in the autumn. A colony begins to rear drones in spring and drone population reaches its peak coinciding with the swarm season in late spring and early summer. The life expectancy of a drone is about 90 days.

Although the drone is highly specialized to perform one function, mating and continuing the propagation of the hive, they may have other purposes. All bees, when they sense the hive's temperature deviating from proper limits, either generate heat by shivering, or exhaust heat by moving air with their wings—behaviours which drones share with worker bees.

== Behavior ==
Drones do not exhibit typical worker bee behaviors such as nectar and pollen gathering, nursing, or hive construction. While drones are unable to sting, if picked up, they may swing their tails in an attempt to frighten the disturber. In some species, drones buzz around intruders in an attempt to disorient them if the nest is disturbed.

Drones fly in abundance in the early afternoon and are known to congregate in drone congregation areas a good distance away from the hive.

== Mating and the drone reproductive organ ==
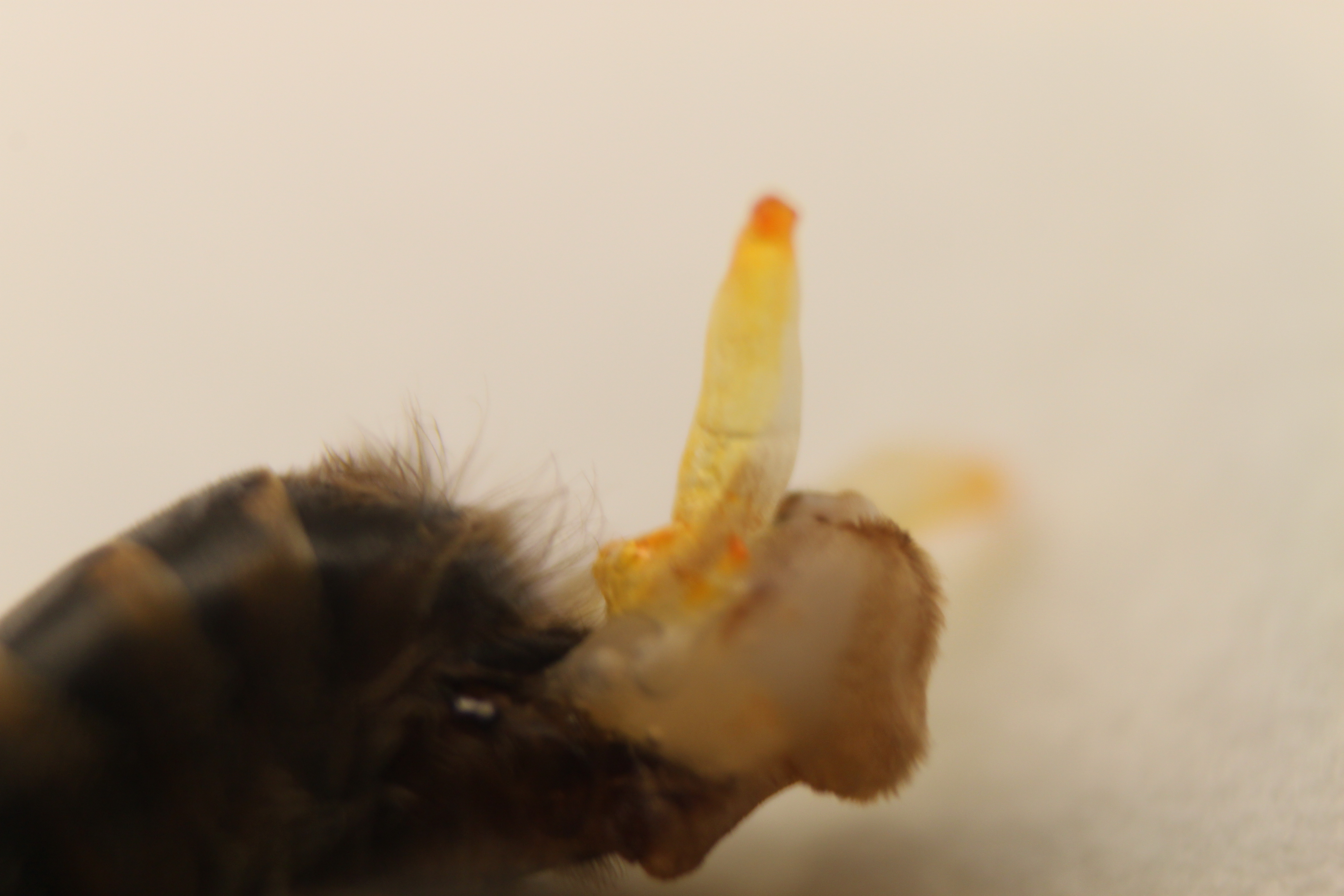
The everted endophallus, with the cornua in focus, resembling hooks.

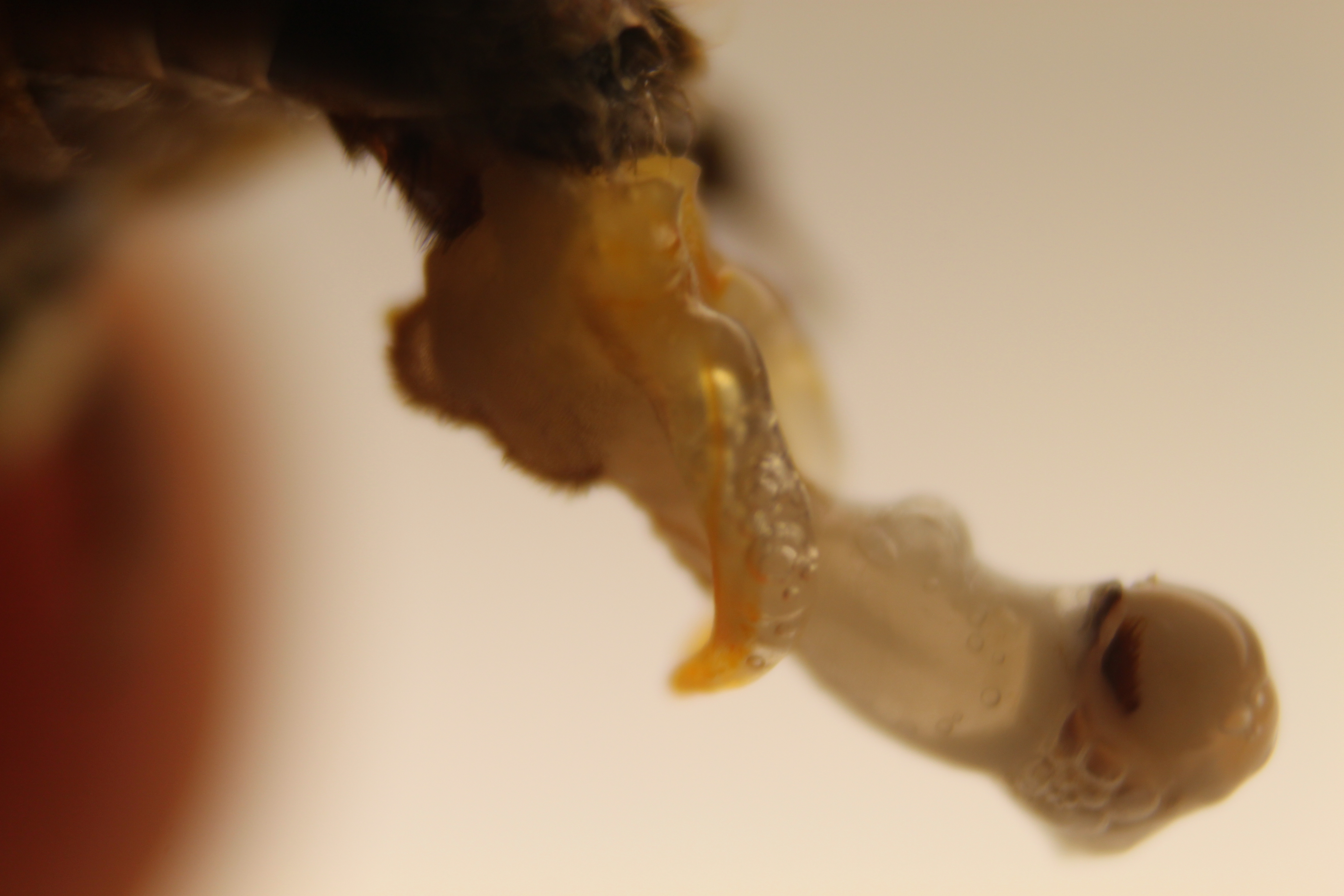
The extended bulbus of the endophallus, containing sperm, is in focus.

The drone endophallus is optimized to disperse a large quantity of seminal fluid and spermatozoa with great speed and force. The endophallus is held internally in the drone. During mating, the organ is everted (turned inside out), into the queen. The eversion of the endophallus is achieved by contracting abdominal muscles, which increases hemolymph pressure, effectively "inflating" the endophallus. Cornua claspers at the base of the endophallus help to grip the queen.

Mating between a single drone and the queen lasts less than 5 seconds, and it is often completed within 1–2 seconds. Mating occurs mid-flight, and 10–40 m (33–131 ft) above ground. Since the queen mates with 5–19 drones, and drones die after mating, each drone must make the most of his single shot. The drone makes first contact from above the queen, his thorax above her abdomen, straddling her. He then grasps her with all six legs, and everts the endophallus into her opened sting chamber. If the queen's sting chamber is not fully opened, mating is unsuccessful, so some males that mount the queen do not transfer semen. Once the endophallus has been everted, the drone is paralyzed, flipping backwards as he ejaculates. The process of ejaculation is explosive—semen is blasted through the queen's sting chamber and into the oviduct. The process is sometimes audible to the human ear, akin to a "popping" sound. The ejaculation is so powerful that it ruptures the endophallus, disconnecting the drone from the queen. The bulb of the endophallus is broken off inside the queen during mating—so drones mate only once, and die shortly after. The leftover endophallus remaining in the queen's oviduct is referred to as the "mating sign". The plug will not prevent the next drone from mating with the same queen, but may prevent semen from flowing out of the oviduct.

== Drone congregation areas ==
Mating between the drones and a virgin queen takes place away from the colony, in mid-air mating sites. These mating sites, called "congregation areas", are specific locations, where drones wait for the arrival of virgin queens. A congregation area is typically 10–40 m (33–131 ft) above ground, and can have a diameter of 30–200 m (98–656 ft). The boundaries of a congregation area are distinct; queens flying a few meters outside the boundaries are mostly ignored by the drones. Congregation areas are typically used year after year, with some spots showing little change over 12 years. Since drones are expelled from a colony during the winter, and new drones are raised each spring, inexperienced drones must find these congregation areas anew. This suggests some environmental cues define a congregation area, although the actual cues are unknown.

Congregation areas are typically located above open ground, away from trees or hills, where flight is somewhat protected from the wind (calm winds may be helpful during mating flight). At the same time, many congregation areas do not show such characteristics, such as those located above water or the forest canopy. Some studies have suggested that magnetic orientation could play a role, since drones older than 6 days contain cells in the abdomen that are rich in magnetite.

Congregation areas can be located by attaching a virgin queen (in a cage) to a balloon floating above ground. The person then moves around, taking note of where drones are attracted to the caged queen. Congregation areas are not found closer than 90 m (300 ft) from an apiary, and congregation areas located farther away from apiaries receive more drones. In a congregation area, drones accumulate from as many as 200 colonies, with estimates of up to 25,000 individual drones. This broad mixing of drones is how a virgin queen can ensure she will receive the genetic diversity needed for her colony. By flying to congregation areas further away from her colony, she further increases the probability of out-breeding.

A single drone visits multiple congregation areas during his lifetime, often taking multiple trips per afternoon. A drone's mating flight averages 20–25 minutes, before he must return to the colony to refuel with honey. While at the site, the drones fly around passively, waiting for the arrival of a virgin. When the virgin queen arrives to the congregation area, the drones locate her by visual and olfactory cues. At this point, it is a race to mate with the virgin queen, to be genetically represented in the newly founded colony. The swarming drones, as they actively follow the queen, reportedly resemble a "drone comet", dissolving and reforming as the drones chase the virgin queen. Drones greatly outnumber the quantity of virgin queens produced per season, so even with multiple mating by the queen, very few drones mate successfully (estimated at less than one in 1,000). If needed, a virgin queen can embark on multiple "nuptial flights", to be sure to receive enough semen from enough drones.

== Varroa destructor ==
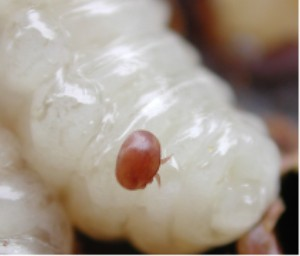
Varroa mite on a honey bee drone larva

Varroa destructor, a parasitic mite, propagates within the brood cell of bees. The Varroa mite prefers drone brood as it guarantees a longer development period, which is important for its own propagation success. The number of Varroa mites can be kept in check by removing the capped drone brood and either freezing the brood comb or heating it.

== See also ==
- Western honey bee life cycle
