= Worker bee =

Caste of honey bee

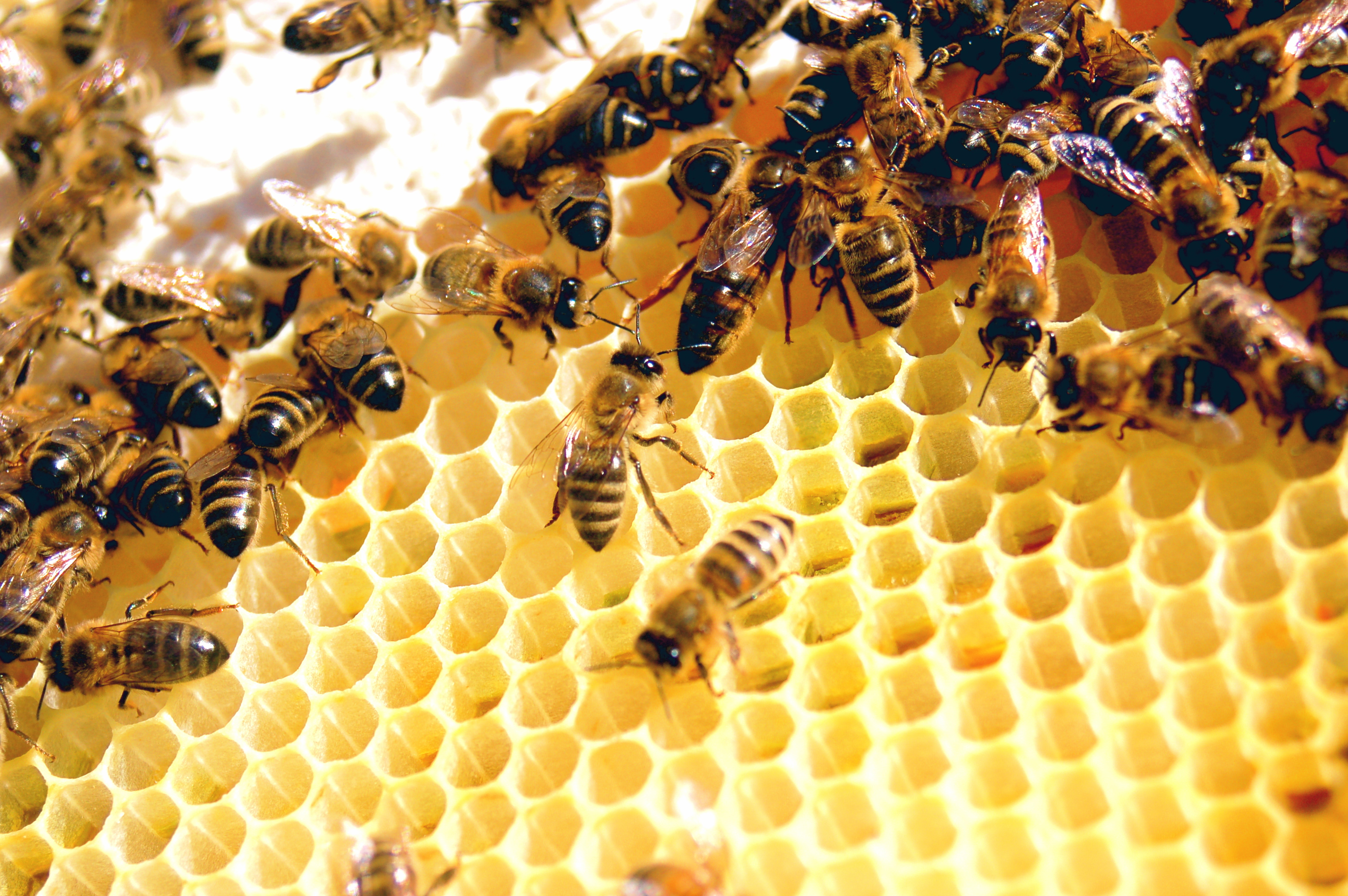
Worker bees (with queen)

A worker bee is any female bee that lacks the reproductive capacity of the colony's queen bee and carries out the majority of tasks needed for the functioning of the hive. While worker bees are present in all eusocial bee species, the term is rarely used (outside of scientific literature) for bees other than honey bees, particularly the European honey bee (Apis mellifera). Worker bees of this variety are responsible for approximately 80% of the world's crop pollination services.

Worker bees are the caste of bee that performs most of the fundamental tasks of the hive, and they are by far the most numerous type of bee. They are much smaller than drones or queen bees, with bodies specialized for nectar and pollen collection. They perform different tasks around the hive progressively over their lifespans in a predictable order based on their age.

Worker bees gather pollen in the pollen baskets on their back legs and carry it back to the hive where it is used as food for the developing brood. Pollen carried on their bodies may be transferred to another flower, where a small portion can rub off on the pistil, resulting in cross pollination. Nectar is sucked up through the proboscis, mixed with enzymes in the stomach, and carried back to the hive, where it is stored in wax cells and evaporated into honey.

== Life cycle ==
Honey bee workers maintain the hive temperature in the critical brood area where new bees are hatched and raised. Workers must maintain the hive's brood chamber within a range of 34–36 °C (93–97 °F). If the chamber becomes too hot, the workers collect water or diluted nectar and deposit it around the hive, then fan the air with their wings to generate cooling by evaporation. If the chamber becomes too cold, worker bees can increase the temperature of their thoracic muscles using isometric contractions, pressing their warmed muscles against caps or walls of brood cells. In the wintertime, worker bees can cluster together to generate body heat to keep the brood area warm as external temperature decreases.

The life span of a worker bee fluctuates between the summer and winter months. In the summertime, worker bees typically only live two to six weeks compared to wintertime when workers can live up to 20 weeks. The reason for this difference lies in interior physiological processes that worker bees experience, and external factors, such as bees not leaving the relative safety of the hive during the colder winter months. Worker bees are exposed to a lot more risks during the summer months when they leave the hive to forage, and therefore have a shorter lifespan.

Honey bees begin as an egg laid by the queen in the brood nest, located near the center of the hive. Worker eggs are laid in smaller cells compared to drone eggs, and will hatch after three days into a larva. Nurse bees feed it royal jelly for three days, followed by pollen and honey for about two more days until the cell is capped by worker bees. The larva spins itself into a cocoon and becomes an inactive pupa. During this 10-day stage, the bee begins to develop features such as eyes, wings, legs and other features that adult bees possess. After this 21 day developmental period, the adult bee will chew through its wax cap and cocoon and emerge into the hive as a fully grown bee, immediately beginning its roles in the hive.

Type	Egg	Larva	Cell capped	Pupa	Average Developmental Period (Days until emergence)	Start of Fertility	Body Length	Hatching Weight
Worker	up to Day 3	up to Day 9	Day 9	Day 10 until emergence (Day 11 or 12 last moult)	21 days (range: 18–22 days)	N/A	12–15 mm	nearly 100 mg

== Progression of tasks ==
Through the lifecycle of a worker bee, she will take on many different roles within the hive, depending on how old she is and how long she has been working in the hive. The exact number of days she spends at each task depends on the requirements of the hive, however there is an estimated number of days each worker bee will spend at each task.

=== Cell cleaning (days 1–2) ===
Brood cells must be cleaned before the next use. Worker bees in the cleaning phase perform this cleaning. Cells are inspected by the queen and if unsatisfactory, they will not be used. If the cells are not clean, the worker bee must repeat the cleaning process.

=== Nurse bees (days 3–12) ===
Nurse bees feed the worker larvae worker jelly, which is secreted from glands that produce royal jelly. On days 6–12, nurse bees feed royal jelly, rich in vitamins, to the queen larva and drones. Drones receive worker jelly for 1 to 3 days until they are started on a diet of honey.

=== Queen attendants (days 7-11) ===
Queen attendants take care of the queen by feeding and grooming her. After coming into contact with the queen, the attendants spread queen mandibular pheromone (QMP) throughout the hive, which is a signal to the rest of the bees that the hive still has a viable queen.

=== Wax production (days 13–18) ===
Wax bees build cells from wax, repair old cells, and store nectar and pollen brought in by other workers. Early in the worker's career, she exudes wax from the space between her abdominal segments. Four sets of wax glands, situated inside the last four ventral segments of the abdomen, produce wax for comb construction.

=== Guard bee (18-21) ===
Worker bees can perform guard duty at the front entrance, when their stinger is mature, to protect the colony from robbing.

=== Foraging bees (days 21–42) ===
The forager and scout bees travel up to 3 kilometres (1.9 miles) to a nectar source, pollen source, or to collect propolis or water. Worker bees journey away from the hive around 10 times each day, with each trip lasting an hour.

== Worker activities in the hive ==
=== Honey production ===
Worker bees collect nectar from flowers using their tubular mouth parts, and store it in their honey stomach. Enzymes proceed to break down the nectar into simple sugars. Back at the hive, the nectar is distributed to other worker bees who either distribute it to young bees or store it in honeycomb cells. Then, honey is produced by being further dehydrated via fanning then sealed with a wax cap, which prevents absorption of moisture from the air.

=== Drone feeding ===
Drones do not feed themselves when they are young; they are fed by workers and then when the drone bees get older they feed themselves from the honey supply.

=== Honeycomb building ===
Worker bees have eight pairs of wax glands under their abdomen from which they can create honeycomb. By chewing the wax, she mixes in her saliva, which adjusts the malleability of the wax and enables her to create each individual honeycomb cell. This process is repeated thousands of times to create comb in the hive, which will be used for honey or pollen storage and for brood space.

=== Pollen packing ===
Pollen brought into the hive for feeding the brood is also stored. It must be packed firmly into comb cells and mixed with a small amount of honey so that it will not spoil. Unlike honey, which does not support bacterial life, stored pollen will become rancid without proper care. It has to be kept in honey cells.

=== Propolizing ===
The walls of the hive are covered with a thin coating of propolis, a resinous substance obtained from plants. When workers add enzymes to the propolis, the combination has antibacterial and antifungal properties. Propolis is placed at the entrance of hives to aid in ventilation.

Some bees add excess mud to the mixture, making it geopropolis, such as in the bee Melipona scutellaris. Geopropolis displays antimicrobial and antiproliferative activity and has been proven to be a source of antibiofilm agents. It also presents selectivity against human cancer cell lines at low concentrations compared to normal cells.

=== Mortuary bees ===
Dead bees and failed larvae must be removed from the hive to prevent disease and allow cells to be reused. They will be carried some distance from the hive by mortuary bees.

=== Fanning bees ===
Worker bees fan the hive, cooling it with evaporated water. They direct airflow into the hive or out of the hive depending on need.

=== Water carriers ===
When the hive is in danger of overheating, these bees will obtain water, usually from within a short distance from the hive and bring it back to spread on the backs of fanning bees.

=== Guard bees ===
Guard bees will stand at the front of the hive entrance, defending it from any invaders such as wasps. The number of guards varies from season to season and from species to species. Entrance size and daily traffic also play an integral role in the number of guard bees present. Guard bees of the species Tetragonisca angustula and Schwarziana quadripunctata are examples of eusocial bees that have been observed hovering at their nest entrances, providing more protection against intruders.

== Genetic characteristics ==
In most common bee species, worker bees are infertile due to enforced altruistic kin selection, and thus never reproduce. Workers are nevertheless considered female for anatomical and genetic reasons. Genetically, a worker bee does not differ from a queen bee and can even become a laying worker bee, but in most species will produce only male (drone) offspring. Whether a larva becomes a worker or a queen depends on the kind of food it is given after the first three days of its larval form.

== Gut bacteria ==
The workers perform different behavioral tasks in the colony that cause them to be exposed to different local environments. The worker gut microbial community composition is found to be associated with the behavioral tasks they perform, therefore also with the local environment they are exposed to and the environmental landscape is shown to affect the gut microbial community (gut microbiota composition) of honey bees.

== Stinger ==
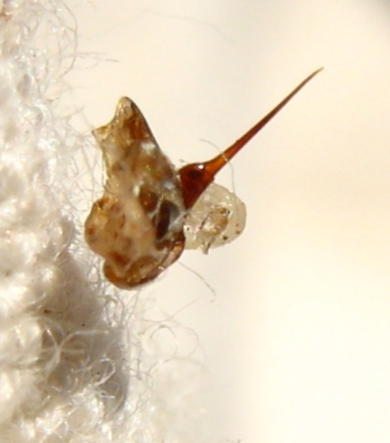
The stinger of a black honeybee torn off its body and attached to a protecting dress

The worker bee's stinger is a complex organ that allows a bee to defend itself and the hive from most mammals. Bee stings against mammals and birds typically leave the stinger embedded in the victim due to the structure of flesh and the stinger's barbs. In this case, the venom bulb stays with the stinger and continues to pump. The bee will die after losing its stinger, as the removal of the stinger and the venom bulb damages or removes other internal organs as well.

The barbs on the stinger will not catch on most animals besides mammals and birds, which means that such animals can be stung repeatedly by the same bee.

== Other social bees ==
There are many types of eusocial bees, including bumble bees, stingless bees, some orchid bees, and many species of sweat bees, native to all continents except for Antarctica, that have workers. Workers in these other bee lineages do not show significant morphological differences from queens, other than coloration or a smaller average body size, though they are often quite different in their behavior from queens, and may or may not lay eggs. See the respective articles for these lineages for details.
