= Glossary of beekeeping =

This page is a glossary of beekeeping.

== A ==
- Africanized bee – a hybrid bee with characteristics unsuitable for beekeeping
- Apiary – a yard where beehives are kept
- Apicology – ecology of bees
- Apiology – scientific study of bees
- Apitherapy – a branch of alternative medicine that uses honey bee products including honey, pollen, propolis, royal jelly and bee venom.

== B ==
- Bee – a member of the order that includes ants and wasps
- Bee anatomy (mouth)
- Bee bread – the main source of food for most honey bees and their larvae
- Beekeeper – also called apiarist or apiculturist, a person who cares for bees
- Bee learning and communication
- Bee museums
- Bee sting
- Bee venom therapy – also called apitherapy
- Beehive – a housing for cavity-dwelling bees that allows inspection and honey removal
- Beekeeping – bees are kept for their products (principally honey), and their utility in pollinating crops
- Bees and toxic chemicals
- Brood (honey bee) – the egg, larval, and pupal form of the bee and the comb in which they develop
- Buckfast bee – a productive breed of bee suitable for damp and cloudy climes

== C ==
- Carniolan honey bee – a gentle bee good for variable nectar flow
- Characteristics of common wasps and bees
- Colony Collapse Disorder – malady of unknown cause characterized by disappearance of bees from hive

== D ==
- Deseret – the beehive and its symbolism to the Church of Jesus Christ of Latter-day Saints (Mormons)
- Diseases of the honey bee
- Drone bee – the male bee
- Drone laying queen

== H ==
- Honey bee – all the species in the genus Apis
- Honey bee life cycle – the physical stages in the development of a mature bee starting from the egg

== I ==
- Italian bee – the most well known honey bee subspecies

== L ==
- Laying worker bee – this worker will produce only drone bees
- Langstroth hive – commonly seen in developed countries as stacks of white or muted colored boxes at the edges of fields and orchards

== N ==
- Northern Nectar Sources for Honey Bees – common names and descriptions of northern latitude nectar plants

== P ==
- Pesticide toxicity to bees
- Piping queen – queens will make audible sounds at certain times
- Pollinator decline – loss of bees and other pollinators is an environmental issue

== Q ==
- Queen bee – a single egg laying bee capable of producing workers, drones, and queens

== R ==
- Honey bee race
- Russian honey bee

== S ==
- Stingless bees – Trigona and Melipona bees kept from ancient times in Central America and Australia
- Swarming – the means by which bee colonies propagate

== T ==
- Top-bar hive – an alternative to the Langstroth box hive, with some advantages for casual beekeeping

== V ==
- Virgin queen – a queen that has not yet bred with drones

== W ==
- Western honey bee – European honey bees
- Worker bee – the many tasks performed by this class of bee during her short lifetime and her specialized single-use stinger

== See also ==
- List of honey plants
