= Nicholas Tsoucalas =

American judge

Senior Judge of the United States Court of International Trade
- In office September 30, 1996 – March 22, 2018

Judge of the United States Court of International Trade
- In office June 9, 1986 – September 30, 1996
- Appointed by: Ronald Reagan
- Preceded by: Nils Boe
- Succeeded by: Delissa A. Ridgway

Personal details
- Born: Nicholas Tsoucalas; August 24, 1926 New York City, New York, U.S.
- Died: March 22, 2018 (aged 91) Weston, Massachusetts, U.S.
- Education: Kent State University (BS); New York Law School (LLB)

Nicholas Tsoucalas (August 24, 1926 – March 22, 2018) was an American lawyer and United States Judge of the United States Court of International Trade. He was of Greek descent.

== Early life, education and career ==
Judge Tsoucalas was one of five children born to Greek immigrants George and Maria Tsoucalas, on August 24, 1926 in New York City, New York. He was educated in the NYC public schools. While in school, he worked at the Le Petit Paris Restaurant, which his father owned for 40 years at Broadway and 145th Street, in Manhattan.

He received a Bachelor of Science degree in 1949 from Kent State University. He received a Bachelor of Laws degree in 1951 from New York Law School. He served in the United States Navy from 1944 to 1946 and again from 1951 to 1952.

He worked in private practice in New York City from 1953 to 1955. He was an Assistant United States Attorney for the Southern District of New York from 1955 to 1959. He worked in private practice in New York City again from 1959 to 1968. He served as a supervisor for the 1960 Census. He served as a Judge of the New York City Criminal Court from 1968 to 1975 and again from 1982 to 1986. He served as an acting Supreme Court Justice in Kings County and Queens County from 1975 to 1982.

== Trade Court service ==
On September 11, 1985, President Reagan nominated Tsoucalas to be a Judge of the United States Court of International Trade, to the seat vacated by Judge Nils Boe. He was confirmed by the United States Senate on June 6, 1986, and received his commission on June 9, 1986. He took senior status on September 30, 1996, and was succeeded by Judge Delissa A. Ridgway. He served in that status until his death on March 22, 2018, from complications of pneumonia at the age of 91.

== Sources ==
Legal offices
Preceded by Nils Boe	Judge of the United States Court of International Trade; 1986–1996	Succeeded by Delissa A. Ridgway
