= Delissa A. Ridgway =

American judge (born 1955)

Delissa Anne Ridgway

Senior Judge of the United States Court of International Trade
- Incumbent
- Assumed office January 31, 2019

Judge of the United States Court of International Trade
- In office March 17, 1998 – January 31, 2019
- Appointed by: Bill Clinton
- Preceded by: Nicholas Tsoucalas
- Succeeded by: Stephen Vaden

Personal details
- Born: June 28, 1955 (age 70) Kirksville, Missouri, U.S.
- Education: University of Missouri (BA); Northeastern University School of Law (JD)

Delissa Anne Ridgway (born June 28, 1955) is a senior United States Judge of the United States Court of International Trade.

== Biography ==
Ridgway was born in 1955 in Kirksville, Missouri. She received a Bachelor of Arts degree in 1975 from the University of Missouri in Columbia, Missouri. She received a Juris Doctor in 1979 from the Northeastern University School of Law. She served as a law clerk for Judge June Lazenby Green of the United States District Court for the District of Columbia in 1979. She served in private practice from 1979 to 1994. She worked as an adjunct professor at the Washington College of Law at American University from 1992 to 1994. She served as Chair of the United States Foreign Claims Settlement Commission from 1994 to 1998.

== Trade Court service ==
On January 27, 1998, President Bill Clinton nominated Ridgway to serve as a United States Judge of the United States Court of International Trade, to the seat vacated by Judge Nicholas Tsoucalas. She was confirmed by the Senate on March 11, 1998 and received her commission on March 17, 1998. She assumed senior status on January 31, 2019.

Legal offices
Preceded by Nicholas Tsoucalas	Judge of the United States Court of International Trade; 1998–2019	Succeeded by Stephen Vaden
