= Demaree method =

Bee swarming prevention method

In beekeeping, the Demaree method is a swarming prevention method. It was first published by George Demaree (1832–1915) in an article in the American Bee Journal in 1892. Demaree also described a swarm prevention method in 1884, but that was a two-hive system that is unrelated to modern "demareeing".

As with many swarm prevention methods, demareeing involves separation of the queen and forager bees from the nurse bees. The theory is that forager bees will think that the hive has swarmed if there is a drastic reduction in nurse bees, and that nurse bees will think that the hive has swarmed if the queen appears to be missing and/or there is a drastic reduction in forager bees.

The Demaree method is a frame-exchange method, and as such it is more labour-intensive than methods that do not involve rearranging individual frames. It requires no special equipment except for a queen excluder. In this method, the queen is confined to the bottom box below the queen excluder.

The method relies on the principle that nurse bees will prefer to stay with open brood, and that forager bees will move to frames with closed brood or with room for food.

In the modern Demaree method, the queen is placed in the bottom box, along with one or two frames of brood (but containing no open brood), as well as one or two frames of food stores, and empty combs or foundation. A queen excluder is placed above the bottom box, thereby restricting the queen to the bottom box but allowing bees to move freely between the bottom box and the rest of the hive. The original hive, along with all open brood, is placed above the queen excluder. The method works best if the nurse bees are moved far away from the queen. The distance between the queen and nurse bees can be increased by placing the brood nest at the very top of the hive, with the honey supers between the brood nest and the queen excluder. If any swarm cells are present, these must be destroyed by the beekeeper. The relative absence of queen pheromone in the top box usually prompts the nurse bees to create emergency cells. After 7–10 days, the beekeeper destroys the emergency cells, and then either removes the queen excluder (thereby ending the "demaree") or repeats the process a second or third time until the swarming impulse is over.

The Demaree method makes it possible to retain the total colony population, thus maintaining good honey production. The technique has the advantage of allowing a new queen to be raised as well if one or more queen cells are left to emerge in the top box.
