= Kara Westercamp =

American lawyer and judge (born 1982)

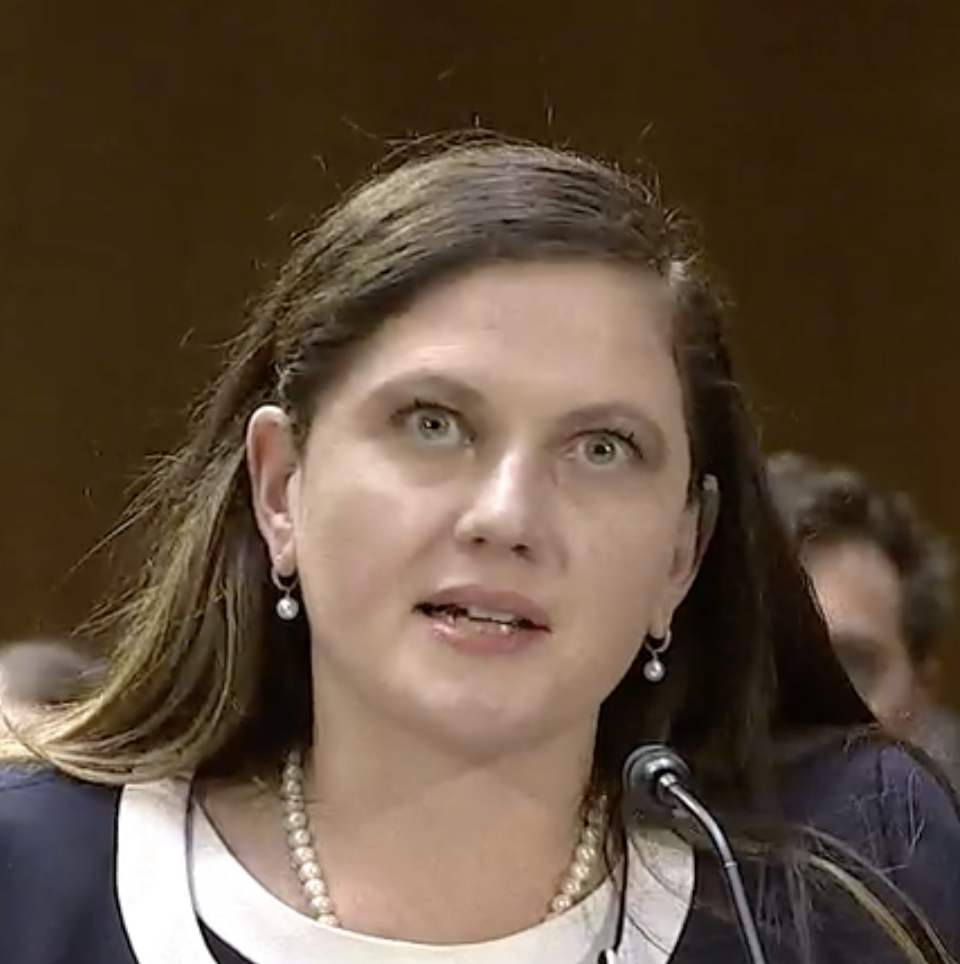
- Westercamp in 2026

Judge of the United States Court of International Trade
- Incumbent
- Assumed office August 10, 2026
- Appointed by: Donald Trump
- Preceded by: Stephen Vaden

Personal details
- Born: Kara Marie Westercamp; 1982 (age 43–44) Cedar Rapids, Iowa, U.S.
- Education: University of Iowa (BBA, BA, MBA, JD)
- Occupation: Lawyer

Kara Marie Westercamp (born 1982) is an American lawyer and judge. She worked as a trade attorney for the United States Department of Justice Civil Division before serving as an associate White House Counsel in the second Trump administration. In February 2026, Westercamp was nominated by President Donald Trump for a seat on the United States Court of International Trade. She was sworn in on August 10, 2026.

== Early life and education ==
Kara Marie Westercamp was born in 1982, at St. Luke's Hospital in Cedar Rapids, Iowa, to Barbara and Keith Westercamp. Her mother worked as a teacher and her father worked as a bank executive. Westercamp studied political science, finance, and management at the University of Iowa, where she was a member of Zeta Tau Alpha and was the 2002 Iowa Honey Queen and 2003 American Honey Princess. She graduated in 2005 with both a Bachelor of Business Administration in finance and management and a Bachelor of Arts in political science from the University of Iowa. She graduated with a Master of Business Administration from the University of Iowa College of Business and a Juris Doctor from the University of Iowa College of Law in 2009.

== Career ==
Westercamp served as a law clerk for John Alfred Jarvey, Chief Judge of the United States District Court for the Southern District of Iowa, from 2009 to 2011. She practiced business litigation at Jones Day in New York City where she was a litigator in the Business & Tort Litigation group. She was an associate at the firm from 2011 to 2014, handling securities regulation and insurance recovery matters, and was admitted to the Iowa bar in 2010 and the New York bar in 2011. While in private practice she represented an asylum seeker from Uganda through the Legal Aid Society, first-chairing the merits hearing in immigration court, and took part in the Her Justice volunteer program and in disaster relief work following Superstorm Sandy; she received the Legal Aid Society's award for outstanding pro bono service in 2014.

She later worked as a trade attorney for the United States Department of Justice, specifically in the department's Civil Division, arguing cases before the United States Court of International Trade. She also argued cases before the United States Court of Appeals for the Federal Circuit and the United States Court of Federal Claims.

She served as an associate White House Counsel in the second Trump administration. President Donald Trump referred to Westercamp as a "very experienced trade lawyer" and stated that she was committed to his "America First" agenda.

=== Federal judicial service ===
On February 12, 2026, Trump announced his intent to nominate Westercamp to fill Stephen Vaden's vacancy on the United States Court of International Trade. The nomination was formally sent to the Senate on March 2, 2026.

During her hearing before the Senate Judiciary Committee on March 25, 2026, Senator Dick Durbin (D-IL) questioned Westercamp about her past social media posts, which included criticism of Senator Mitch McConnell (R-KY) and Senator Lindsey Graham (R-SC). Westercamp apologized for the posts and stated she regretted making them. When questioned by Senator Richard Blumenthal (D-CT) on who won the 2020 presidential election, she stated that "in 2020, President Biden was certified by the Electoral College." Westercamp declined to answer direct questions about rejecting conspiracy theories claiming that law enforcement was responsible for the violence during the January 6 United States Capitol attack.

On April 30, 2026, the Judiciary Committee reported her nomination to the floor on a 12–10 party line vote. On July 16, 2026, the Senate invoked cloture on her nomination 49–48. On July 21, 2026, the Senate confirmed her nomination by a 50–48 vote. She received her judicial commission on August 10, 2026.

== Personal life ==
Westercamp is a member of the Daughters of the American Revolution and the Capital Area Iowa Club in Washington, D.C.

Legal offices
Preceded by Stephen Vaden	Judge of the United States Court of International Trade; 2026–present	Incumbent
