= Stephen Vaden =

American lawyer, politician (born 1982)

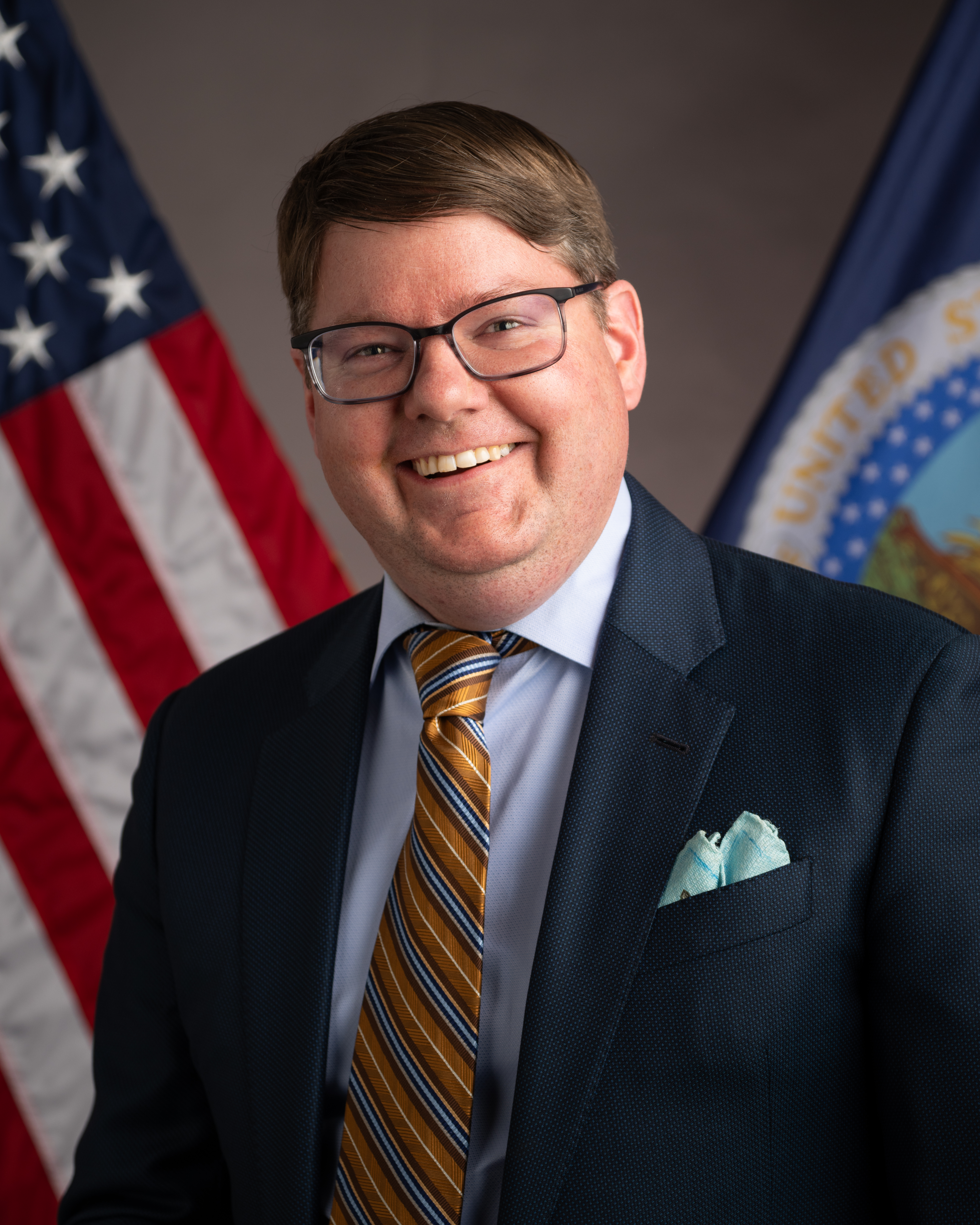
- Official portrait, 2025

16th United States Deputy Secretary of Agriculture
- Incumbent
- Assumed office July 7, 2025
- President: Donald Trump
- Preceded by: Xochitl Torres Small

Judge of the United States Court of International Trade
- In office December 21, 2020 – July 7, 2025
- Appointed by: Donald Trump
- Preceded by: Delissa A. Ridgway
- Succeeded by: Kara Westercamp

Personal details
- Born: Stephen Alexander Vaden; May 15, 1982 (age 44) Memphis, Tennessee, U.S.
- Party: Republican
- Education: Vanderbilt University (BA); Yale University (JD)

Stephen Alexander Vaden (born May 15, 1982) is an American lawyer who has served as the United States deputy secretary of agriculture since July 2025. He served as a United States judge of the United States Court of International Trade from December 2020 until taking office as deputy secretary in July 2025.

== Early life and education ==
Vaden was born on May 15, 1982 in Memphis, Tennessee.

He graduated from Union City High School as the valedictorian of the class of 2000. He earned a Bachelor of Arts from Vanderbilt University and a Juris Doctor from Yale Law School.

== Career ==
After graduating from law school, Vaden served as a law clerk to Judge Julia Smith Gibbons of the United States Court of Appeals for the Sixth Circuit and to Judge Samuel H. Mays Jr. of the United States District Court for the Western District of Tennessee. Vaden has practiced law at Patton Boggs and Jones Day, specializing in appellate litigation, election law, and administrative law.

=== General Counsel of the Department of Agriculture ===
Vaden served on the first Trump administration's United States Department of Agriculture landing team. He was appointed Principal Deputy General Counsel of the department on March 17, 2017, succeeding Lee Fink.

On September 2, 2017, Vaden was nominated to be the general counsel for the United States Department of Agriculture. He was confirmed by the United States Senate on November 27, 2018 by a 53–46 vote, and was sworn in on December 14, 2018. He left the Department after being commissioned as a Judge of the Court of International Trade.

=== Trade Court service ===
On October 2, 2019, President Trump announced his intent to nominate Vaden to the United States Court of International Trade. On October 17, 2019, his nomination was sent to the Senate. President Trump nominated Vaden to the seat vacated by Judge Delissa A. Ridgway, who assumed senior status on January 31, 2019. A hearing on his nomination before the Senate Judiciary Committee was held on November 13, 2019. On January 3, 2020, his nomination was returned to the President under Rule XXXI, Paragraph 6 of the United States Senate. Later that day, he was re-nominated to the same seat. On January 16, 2020, his nomination was reported out of committee by a 12–10 vote. On November 18, 2020, the Senate invoked cloture on his nomination by a 49–44 vote. His nomination was confirmed later that day by a 49–43 vote. He received his judicial commission on December 21, 2020.

=== U.S. deputy secretary of agriculture ===
On December 22, 2024, President-elect Donald Trump announced that he would nominate Vaden to be deputy secretary at the United States Department of Agriculture. On January 20, 2025, his nomination was submitted to the U.S. Senate. On April 8, a hearing on his nomination was held before the Senate Agriculture, Nutrition and Forestry Committee. On May 5, his nomination was favorably reported out of committee by a 12–11 party-line vote. On June 10, the Senate invoked cloture on his nomination by a 48–45 vote. Later that day, his nomination was confirmed by a 48–45 vote. He was sworn in on July 7, 2025.

Legal offices
Preceded by Delissa A. Ridgway	Judge of the United States Court of International Trade; 2020–2025	Succeeded by Kara Westercamp
Political offices
Preceded by Xochitl Torres Small	United States Deputy Secretary of Agriculture; 2025–present	Incumbent
