= Honey Queen Program =

Program to select spokeswomen for honey and beekeeping industries

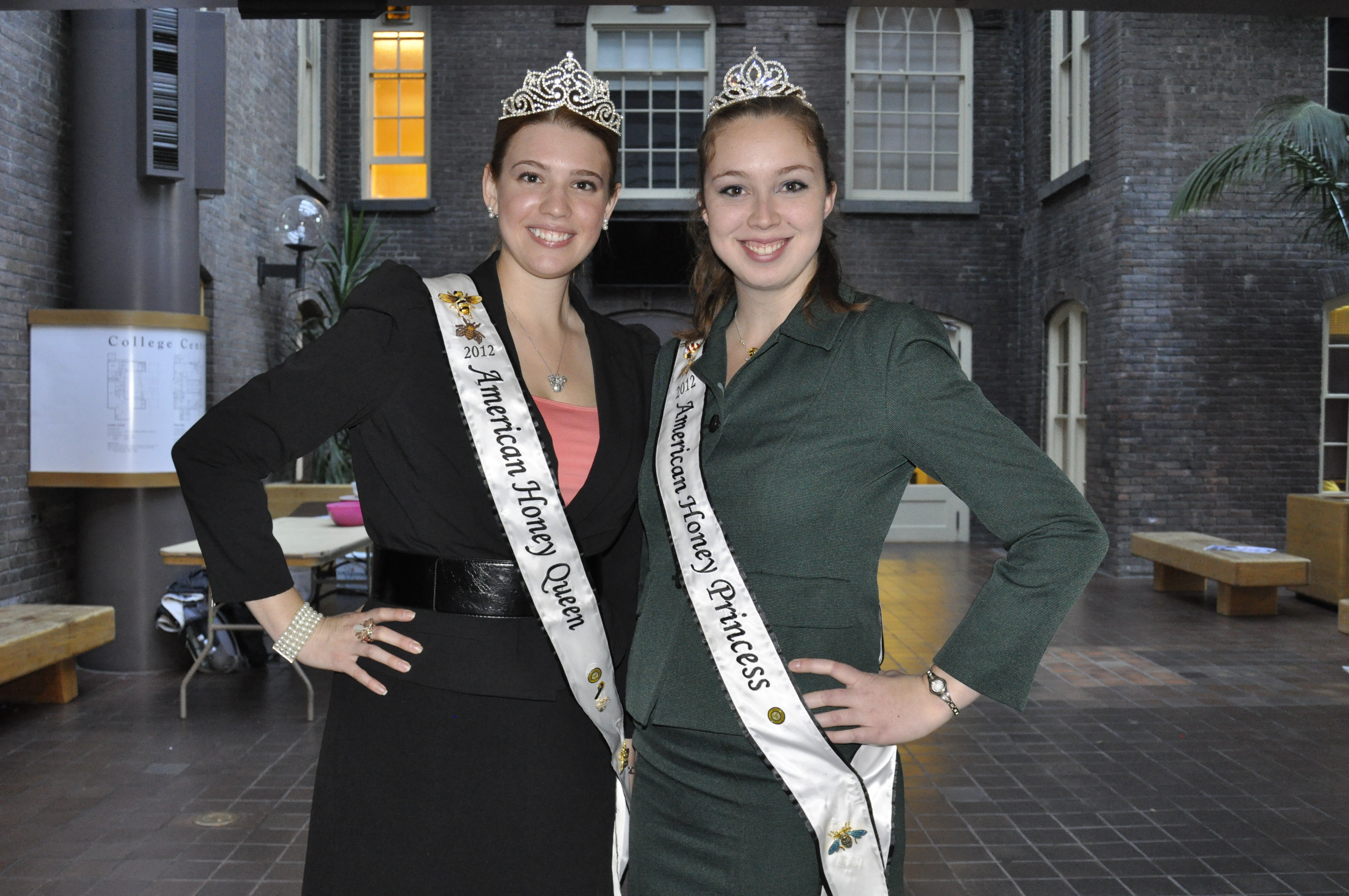
2012 American Honey Queen Alyssa Fine, from Pennsylvania (left) and 2012 American Honey Princess Danielle Dale, from Wisconsin (right) visiting Vassar College.

A Honey Queen Program is a local, state, or national program which annually selects young women to become the spokespeople for the honey and beekeeping industries in the area, state, or region. The national program, the American Honey Queen Program, is facilitated through the sponsorship of the American Beekeeping Federation and involves a lengthy competition, the winners of which travel around the United States and beyond promoting the honey and beekeeping industries and educating the public on the importance of honey bees, beekeeping, and honey.

== History and origins ==
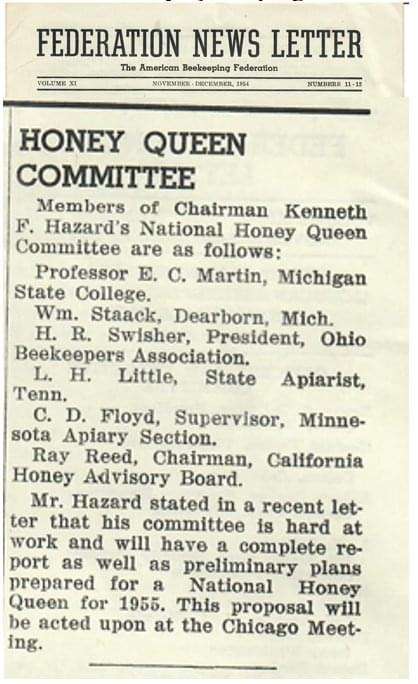
American Beekeeping Federation News Letter Nov Dec 1954

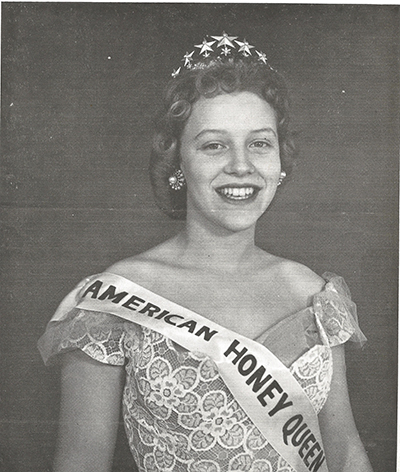
Hailing from Michigan, Esther Kay Seidelman served as the first ever American Honey Queen in 1959.

When establishing the Honey Queen Program, the founder, Esther Piechowski, tapped into already established markets such as the American Association of Advertising Agencies and Teacher's Homemakers of America. In Redgranite, Wisconsin, she developed the Honey Queen Program on the state level, crowning the first Wisconsin Honey Queen in 1957. In 1959, the first American Honey Queen was chosen and given a banner, to identify her title, and a crown. Piechowski next expanded the program to the national level by highlighting its potential: its relatively low cost, the opportunities to raise awareness, and marketing opportunities. Her platform was accepted and developed into a committee. The program started at a grassroots level and has since evolved to include 21 states that have either a Honey Queen or Honey Princess, with a total of 27 states sending candidates to the North American Beekeeping Conference & Tradeshow to compete for those titles (see Participating States). Over time, the number of states participating has fluctuated for myriad reasons. As the number of beekeepers and the strength of the organization within a given state decline, fewer Honey Queens came out of that particular state. Due to the professionalism embedded within each Honey Queen, there will always be a role for her as a spokesperson, and the program remains valuable.

Historically, a greater proportion of Southern states sent participants to the competition due to the established culture of Beauty Queens. The founders of the program thought that a young, attractive woman would be able to easily get interviews with radio and eventually television and easily engage with the general public. However, the emphasis of the criteria to select a Honey Queen has shifted in recent decades from physical appearance to communication and professionalism.

== Purpose ==
The American Honey Queen Program is a national competition program sponsored by the American Beekeeping Federation (ABF), with its main priorities being the promotion of the world of beekeeping, to increase the national honey consumption, and educate the public about the value of honey bees. The American Beekeeping Federation is a national organization that supports the interests of all beekeepers and individuals associated with the beekeeping industry in the United States. A Honey Queen and Princess are crowned each year, serving as representatives and salespersons of both the beekeeping and honey industries in the U.S. The Honey Queen and Princess aim to educate the public spreading their experience and knowledge of the beekeeping and honey industry, focusing on issues such as how the U.S. agriculture depends on a healthy honey bee population as far as the pollination of the nation's crops. The Honey Queen and Princess also educate the public on the benefits of honey —how honey is a healthy substitute for sugar, how it extends the shelf life of baked products, and how it adds a unique quality such as flavor or texture to other products.

== Competition ==
The American Honey Queen Program is a competitive local, state and national program. A queen is selected at the national level and the runner-up becomes the Honey Princess. The Honey Queen Committee, which is considered the “backbone” of the Honey Queen Program consists, at all three levels, of a chairperson and two or more members of the association. The selection of the American Honey Queen begins at the local level; candidates must apply and be selected by the members of the Local Honey Queen Program. “Selection of the Local Honey Queen may either be through a contest sponsored by an association or individual or by simply selecting a young lady who has the qualities to fulfill the position of Local Honey Queen”. Local Honey Queen candidates are young women from an accredited high school or college who are approved by the Honey Queen Committee. There are few competition requirements for the Local Honey Queen and selection is often based most upon her interest in the program and her willingness to learn about honey, bees and beekeeping.

Knowledge a Local Honey Queen should acquire and demonstrate:

1. About beekeeping
  1. Parts of the hive and their proper names
  2. Three castes of bees – Queen, Drone, Worker – and their responsibilities
  3. Floral sources of the area represented
  4. Production of honey
  5. Processing of honey
  6. Seasonal management of colonies
  7. Benefits of the honeybee to agriculture and natural resources through pollination
2. About honey
  1. Normal range of area honey's moisture content
  2. Granulation – what causes it and what to do about it
  3. Conversion of recipes from sugar to honey
  4. Varieties of honey
  5. Cooking hints
  6. Other uses of honey
3. About other marketable products of the hive
  1. Pollen
  2. Royal Jelly
  3. Beeswax
  4. Propolis
  5. Pollination service
  6. Bee venom

Once a Local Honey Queen is selected, she may move on to compete at the state level. For states that do not have a Local Honey Queen Program, there may be a selection at the state level as well, based on the candidate's professionalism, interest in public speaking and communication, interpersonal skills, willingness to learn about beekeeping and honey, essays and interview process, and she should possess the same knowledge about bees and beekeeping that candidates at the local level are required to have. State Honey Queen candidates must be between 17 and 24 years old. State Honey Queens also compile a scrapbook of all of their accomplishments, travels, and things she did as a Honey Queen- how she promoted the industry over time, all the schools, agricultural events, festivals she participated in; TV and radio interviews, newspaper articles, cooking demonstrations, State and County Fair participation- to be presented and evaluated at the national competition.

The third tier of competition is the national level, the American Honey Queen Contest. The state and national level competitions are very similar in terms of what the candidates are judged on. Candidates must be between 18 and 25 years of age at this level, and are required to have served as local or state honey queen for at least six months prior to the competition. Each American Honey Queen candidate must submit an application, list of her state promotions, an essay on an aspect of beekeeping or honey production, a brief autobiography and three photographs in order to compete. As part of the competition, she is required to give a marketing or sales presentation on a topic selected by the American Honey Queen Committee directed to an audience of her choice (i.e. adult, youth), portions of which she will likely adapt and incorporate into her presentations during her travels around the country as Honey Queen. Additionally, she presents the scrapbook of her travels and work as a state Honey Queen; the judges evaluate the scrapbook to assess how active the state Honey Queen was during her reign, making sure that she traveled to a variety of places. The national competition is held at the American Beekeeping Federation's national annual convention in January.

The American Honey Queen is selected by a panel of three judges. The judges are appointed by the chair who looks for attendees of the ABF convention that have extensive knowledge in the beekeeping industry, experience with the competition, and/or public relations. The chair tries to include both someone from within the industry who has a firm base of knowledge and possibly someone from outside the organization with a media background, such as a reporter. The judges change every year and maintain an undisclosed identity throughout the convention so that they can observe candidates in multiple facets.

More details on the competition, judging, and eligibility criteria such as marital status, appropriate attire, concealment and removal of body art and piercings, etc. can be found in the American Beekeeping Federation's “American Honey Queen Program Guidelines for Honey Queen Programs.”

== Responsibilities and activities ==
Honey Queens are spokespeople for the honey and beekeeping industries in America. The Honey Queen program actually plays a significant role in the beekeeping community as it provides a considerable amount of publicity for the beekeeping community, furthering the nation's understanding of how honey bees act as major crop pollinators and how crucial they are to the nation's agriculture as well as giving lessons in baking with honey and general beekeeping tips. They travel across their area of representation (community, state, or country), visiting schools, state and county fairs, conventions, farmers markets, and various club meetings. The intentions of their travels and activities are to increase consumption of honey and other bee products/services as well as make citizens more aware of honey and the issues surrounding it. While there, they sometimes conduct demonstrations such as cooking with honey or basic beekeeping. On other occasions, they give presentations and answer the public's questions, while also tactfully correcting misinformation. They even publish brochures which can be made available to the public through whoever is facilitating the Honey Queen's visit. Furthermore, The public is encouraged to contact and invite the Honey Queen to give presentations at events. As spokespeople for the industry, Honey Queens give interviews through a variety of media sources such as radio, newspaper, television, and most recently the internet. The current American Honey Queen and Princess maintain a website designed for children, Buzzing Across America, providing easy to understand information about honey, bees, and beekeeping. They also regularly update a Facebook page and a YouTube channel. On these three websites, they blog about their activities during their reign, advertise upcoming events, and publish videos to showcase various aspects of honey bees, beekeeping, cooking with honey, and other related activities. Each of these online outlets allow members of the public to ask the Honey Queen and Princess questions. Honey Queens are able to travel across the country on the budget of the American Beekeeping Federation. They primarily stay with host families (usually beekeepers) which facilitate their movements to and from promotional and educational activities.

== Participating states ==
American Honey Queens and Honey Princesses have hailed from the following states: Arkansas, California, Florida, Iowa, Indiana, Kansas, Michigan, Minnesota, Mississippi, Missouri, Nebraska, New Jersey, North Carolina, North Dakota, Ohio, Oregon, Pennsylvania, South Dakota, Tennessee, Texas, and Wisconsin.

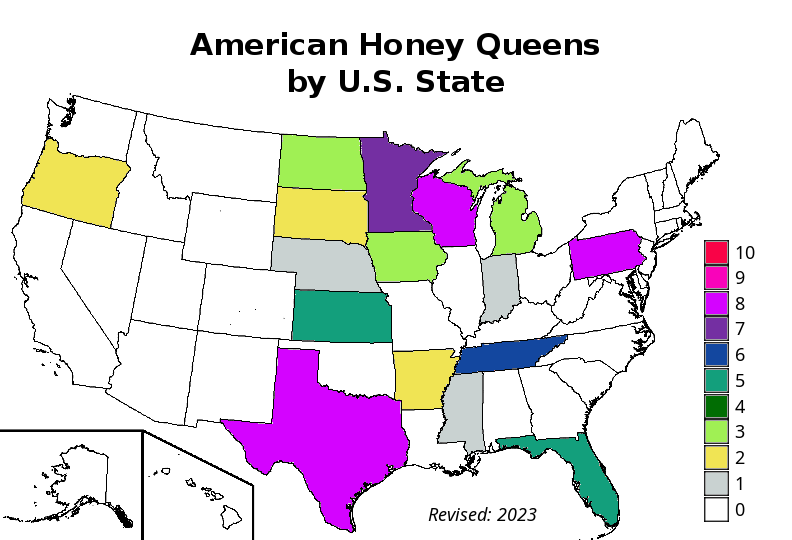
American Honey Queens by U.S. state

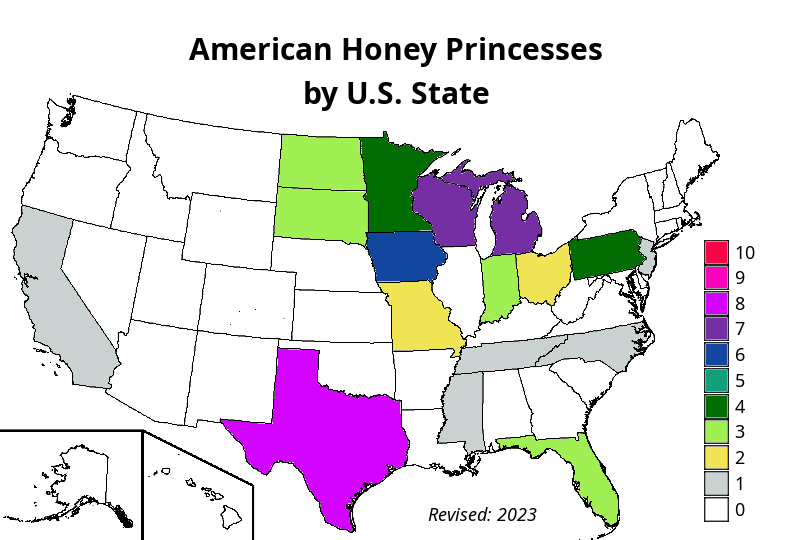
American Honey Princesses by U.S. state

State List

State	Queens	Princesses
Arkansas	2	0
California	0	1
Florida	5	3
Iowa	3	6
Indiana	1	3
Kansas	5	0
Michigan	3	7
Minnesota	7	4
Mississippi	1	1
Missouri	0	2
Nebraska	1	0
New Jersey	0	1
North Carolina	0	1
North Dakota	3	3
Ohio	0	2
Oregon	2	0
Pennsylvania	8	4
South Dakota	2	3
Tennessee	6	1
Texas	8	8
Wisconsin	8	7
Unknown	0	1

American Honey Queen and Princess candidates have hailed from the following states: Arkansas, Pennsylvania, California, Florida, Illinois, Indiana, Iowa, Kansas, Kentucky, Massachusetts, Michigan, Minnesota, Mississippi, Missouri, Montana, Nebraska, New Jersey, North Carolina, North Dakota, Ohio, Oregon, Pennsylvania, South Dakota, Tennessee, Texas, Washington, Wisconsin, and West Virginia. Additionally, there are states who have or have had active honey queen programs in the past, but whose queens have never competed for the American Honey Queen or Princess titles.

== Current Honey Queen and Princess ==
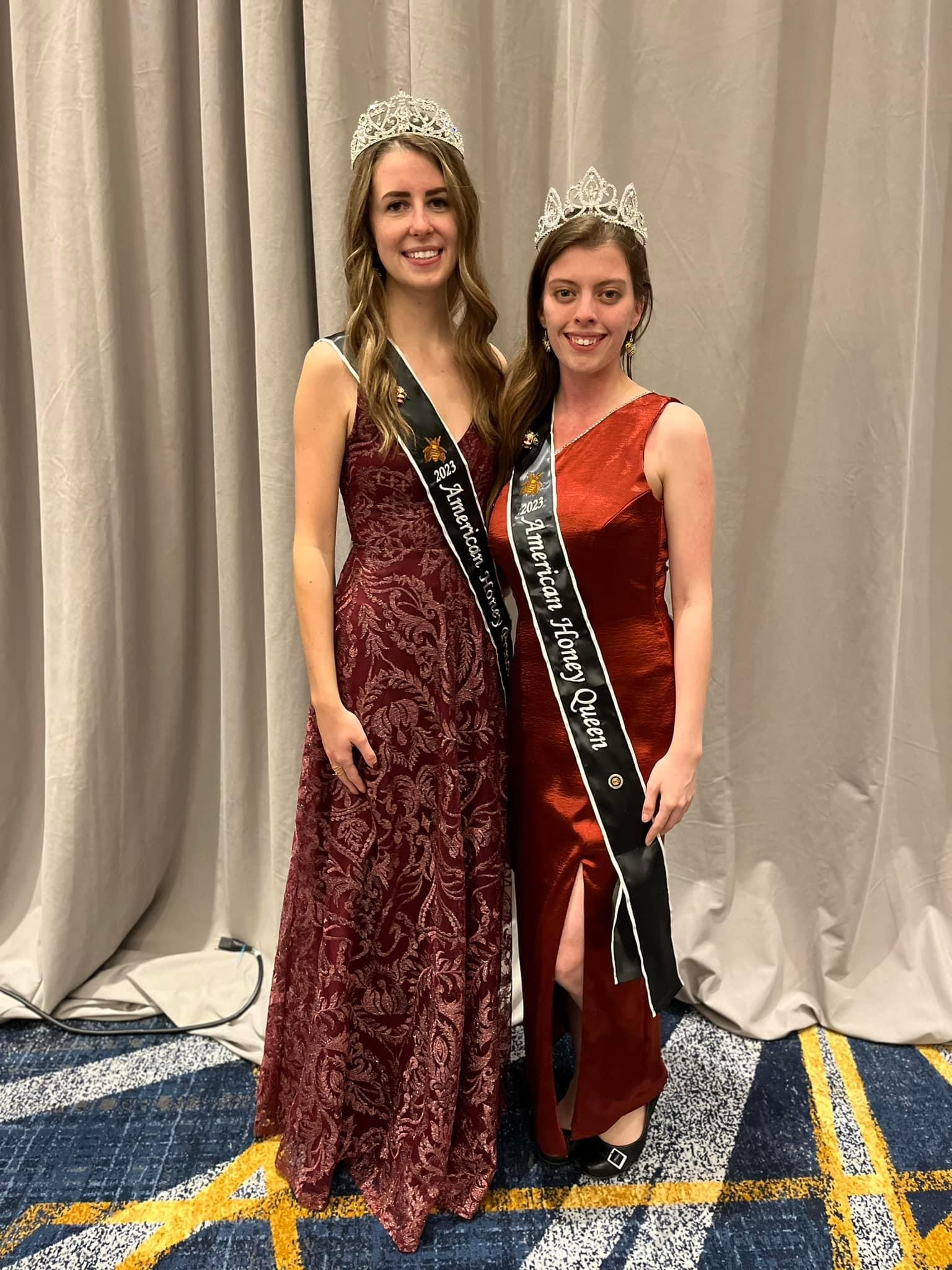
2023 American Honey Queen and Princess

The 2025 Honey Queen is Cheyenne Bastian-Brown and the 2025 Honey Princess is Emilia Burnham.

== Notable honey queens and princesses ==
- Kara Westercamp, 2002 Idaho Honey Queen and 2003 American Honey Princess
