= Bee vac =

A bee vac is a type of vacuum cleaner, factory-made or home-made, designed to suck up live honeybees without killing or damaging them. It can be used to remove bees when capturing a feral colony, or where a swarm has settled.

It uses a solid reception bin, not a dustbag. The reception bin may be cylindrical or in the shape of one level of a Langstroth hive, so that the bin can be separated from the suction gear and stacked in the stack of a Langstroth-type hive while the contained bees go out of it into the ordinary hive stack segments above or below it.

== External links, and references ==
- Google search
