= Swarming (honey bee) =

Reproduction method of honeybee colonies

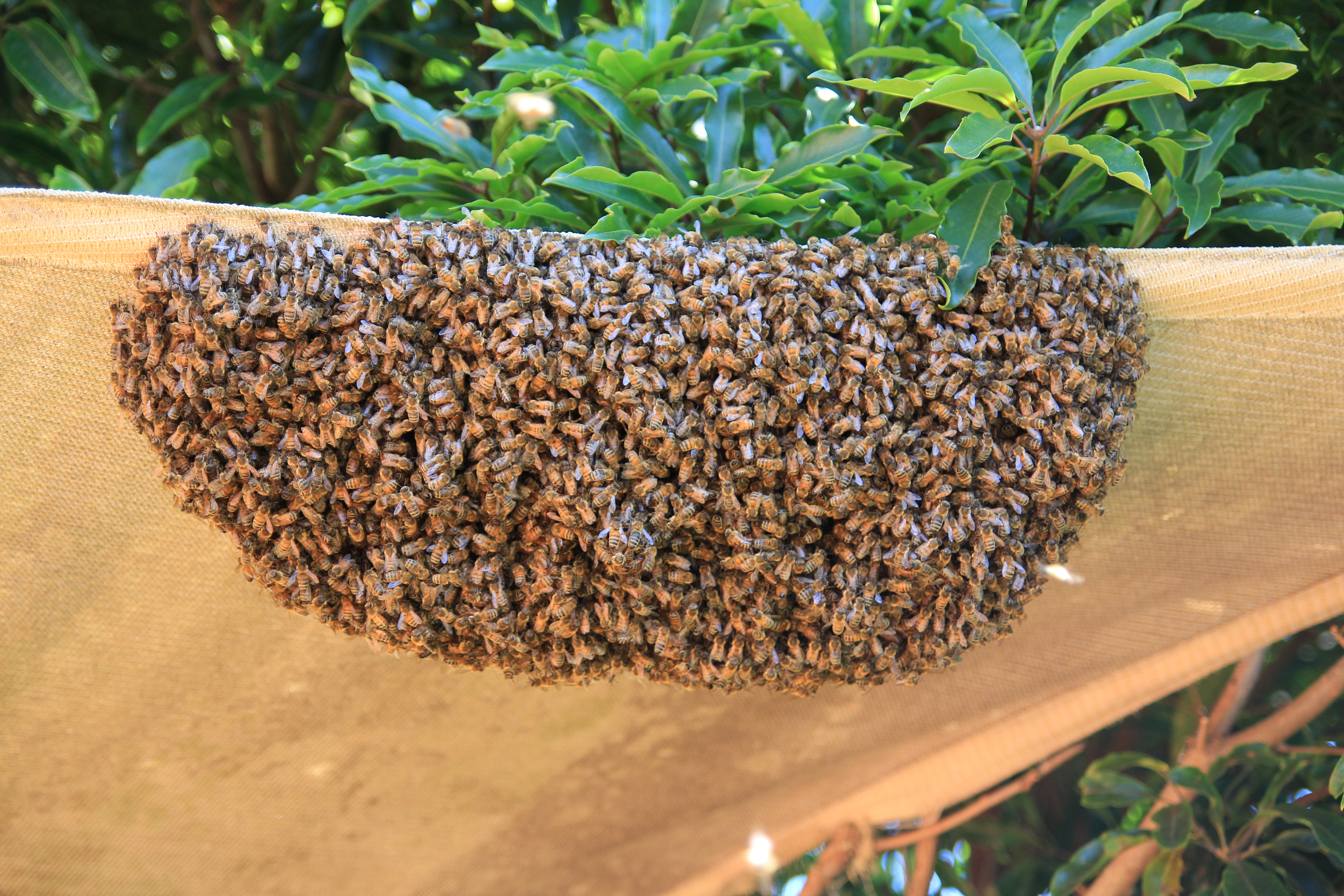
A swarm of bees in Melbourne, Australia

Swarming is a honey bee colony's natural means of reproduction. In the process of swarming, a single colony splits into two or more distinct colonies.

Swarming is mainly a spring phenomenon, usually within a two- or three-week period depending on the locale, but occasional swarms can happen throughout the producing season. Secondary afterswarms, or cast swarms may happen. Cast swarms are usually smaller and are accompanied by a virgin queen. Sometimes a beehive will swarm in succession until it is almost totally depleted of workers.

One species of honey bee that participates in such swarming behavior is Apis cerana. The reproduction swarms of this species settle 20–30 m (70–100 ft) away from the natal nest for a few days and will then depart for a new nest site after getting information from scout bees. Scout bees search for suitable cavities in which to construct the swarm's home. Successful scouts will then come back and report the location of suitable nesting sites to the other bees. Apis mellifera participates in a similar swarming process.

Swarming is prevalent in both rural and urban areas, the latter due to issues such as inadequate beekeeping. When not properly managed bee swarms split off from their hive and find new homes in city infrastructure. This requires intervention by professional beekeepers to relocate them to a proper home.

== Preparation ==
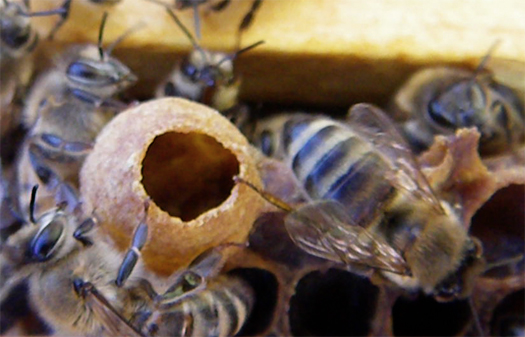
Honey bee queen cup

Worker bees create queen cups throughout the year. When the hive is getting ready to swarm, the queen lays eggs into the queen cups. New queens are raised and the hive may swarm as soon as the queen cells are capped and before the new virgin queens emerge from their queen cells. A laying queen is too heavy to fly long distances. Therefore, the workers will stop feeding her before the anticipated swarm date and the queen will stop laying eggs. Swarming thus creates an interruption in the brood cycle of the original colony. During the swarm preparation, scout bees will simply find a nearby location for the swarm to cluster. When a honey bee swarm emerges from a hive they do not fly far at first. They may gather in a tree or on a branch only a few metres (yards) from the hive. There they cluster about the queen and send 20 to 50 scout bees out to find suitable new nest locations. This intermediate stop is not for permanent habitation and they will normally leave within a few hours to a suitable location. It is from this temporary location that the cluster will determine the final nest site based on the level of excitement of the dances of the scout bees. It is unusual for a swarm to cluster for more than three days at an intermediate stop.

During the intermediate stop, the swarm performs thermoregulation, maintaining its cluster core temperature at 34-36 degrees Celsius (93 to 97 °F) and its cluster mantle temperature above 15 degrees Celsius (59 °F) by reducing heat loss. As soon as the scout bees find a new home, the swarm maintains its mantle temperature to 34-36 degrees Celsius (93 to 97 °F) which is required for the flight. This process is necessary for the conservation of energy supply.

Swarming is a vulnerable time in the life of honey bees. Swarms are provisioned only with the nectar or honey they carry in their stomachs. A swarm will starve if it does not quickly find a home and more nectar sources. This happens most often with early swarms that leave on a warm day that is followed by cold or rainy weather in spring. The remnant colony, after having produced one or more swarms, is usually well provisioned with food. But the new queen can be lost or eaten by predators during her mating flight, or poor weather can prevent her mating flight. In this case, with no further young brood to raise additional queens, the hive will not survive. A cast swarm will usually contain a young virgin queen.

=== Absconding ===
Honeybees swarm to a temporary tree branch before nest site selection.

The propensity to swarm differs among the honey bee species. Africanized bees are notable for their propensity to swarm or abscond. Absconding is a swarm in which the whole colony leaves the hive instead of splitting. This process is mainly determined by climate and effects of climate change and nectar flow. Poor physical conditions such as entry of water into the hive, excessively high temperatures due to lack of shade or shortage of water, the proximity of bush fires or excessive disturbance can also encourage colonies to abscond. Being tropical bees, they tend to swarm or abscond any time food is scarce, thus making themselves vulnerable in colder locales. Mainly for lack of sufficient winter stores, Africanized bee colonies tend to perish in winter in higher latitudes.

There are generally two types of absconding: unplanned and resource-planned. Resource-planned absconding occurs due to scarcity of water or pollen; unplanned absconding occurs due to predation or infestation by undesirable pests.

Generally, a weak bee colony will not swarm until it has produced a larger population. Weak bee colonies can be the result of low food supply, diseases such as foulbrood, or a queen that produces low quantities of eggs.

== Nest site selection ==
A good nesting site for honey bees must be large enough to accommodate their swarm (minimum 15 litres (3.3 imp gal; 4.0 US gal) in volume, preferably ≈40 litres (8.8 imp gal; 11 US gal)). It should be well protected from the elements, and have a small entrance (approximately 12.5 square centimetres (2 sq in)) located at the bottom of the cavity. It must receive a certain amount of warmth from the sun, and should not be infested with ants. In addition to these criteria, nest sites with abandoned honeycombs, if the scout bees can find one, are preferred, because this allows the bees to better conserve their resources.

The scout bees are the most experienced foragers in the resting swarm cluster. Only 3-5% of scout bees are selected for site selection. An individual scout returning to the cluster promotes a location she has found. She uses the waggle dance to indicate its direction, distance, and quality to others in the cluster. The more excited she is about her findings, the more excitedly she dances. If she can convince other scouts to check out the location she found, they take off, check out the proposed site, and choose to promote the site further upon their return.

Several sites may be promoted by different scouts at first. After several hours and sometimes days, a favorite location gradually emerges from this decision-making process. In order for a decision to be made in a relatively short amount of time (the swarm can only survive for about three days on the honey on which they gorged themselves before leaving the hive), a decision will often be made when somewhere around 80% of the scouts have agreed upon a single location and/or when there is a quorum of 20–30 scouts present at a potential nest site. (If the swarm waited for less than 80% of the scouts to agree, the bees would lack confidence in the suitability of the site. If they waited for more than 80% of the scouts to agree, the swarm would be wasting its stored honey.)

When the scout bees agree where to nest, the whole clustered swarm takes off and flies to it. A swarm may fly a kilometer or more to the scouted location, with the scouts guiding the rest of the bees by quickly flying overhead in the proper direction. This collective decision-making process is remarkably successful in identifying the most suitable new nest site and keeping the swarm intact.

== Beekeeping ==
=== Swarm control methods ===
Beekeepers who do not wish to increase their number of active hives may use one or more of many methods for swarm control. Most methods simulate swarming to extinguish the swarming drive.

- Clipping one wing of the queen. When one wing of the queen is clipped, a swarm may issue but due to the queen's inability to fly, the swarm will gather right outside the original hive, where the swarm can be easily collected. The queen oftentimes gets killed by the frustrated worker bees. Even though this is not a swarm prevention method, it is a method of swarm retrieval.
- In the Demaree method, a frame of capped brood is removed with the old queen. This frame is put in a hive box with empty drawn frames and foundation at the same location of the old hive. A honey super is added to the top of this hive topped by a queen excluder. The remaining hive box sans queen is inspected for queen cells. All queen cells are destroyed. This hive box, which has most of the bees, is put on top of the queen excluder. Foraging bees will return to the lower box depleting the population of the upper box. After a week to ten days both parts are inspected again and any subsequent queen cells destroyed. After another period of separation the swarming drive is extinguished and the hives can be re-combined.
- Simply keeping the brood nest open is another method of swarm control. In preparation for swarming, bees fill the brood nest with honey. The queen stops laying to be trim enough to fly, and her newly unemployed nurse bees go with her. The concept of this method is to open the brood nest to employ those nurse bees and get the queen laying again and redirect this sequence of events. This is done by any number of slight variations from empty frames in the brood nest, frames of bare foundation in the brood nest or drawn combs in the brood nest, or moving brood combs to the box above to cause more expansion of the brood nest.
- Checkerboarding. In the late winter, frames are rearranged above the growing brood nest. The frames above the brood nest are alternated between full honey frames and empty drawn out frames or even foundationless frames. It is believed that only colonies that perceive to have enough reserves will attempt to swarm. Checkerboarding frames above the brood nest apparently destroys this sense of having reserves.
- Colony equalization can be done. The food and brood from the strong colonies can be transferred to weaker colonies which typically removes congestion and helps to strengthen the weaker colonies before the nectar flow.

Alternatively, there are also swarm traps with Nasonov pheromone lures that can be used to attract swarms. Beekeepers who are aware that a colony has swarmed may add brood with eggs that is free of mites. Given young brood the bees have a second chance to raise a new queen if the first one fails.

=== Swarm capture ===
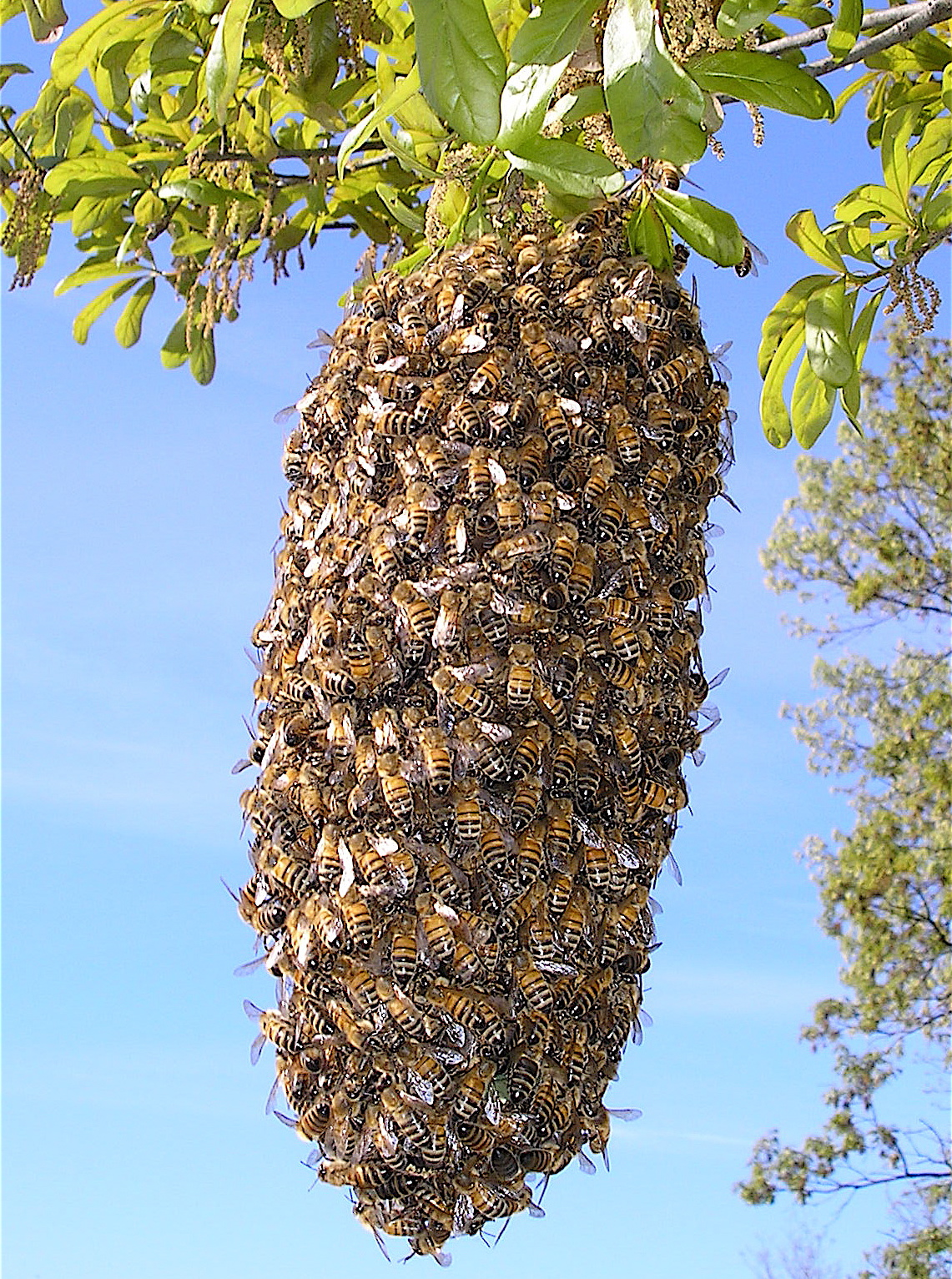
Bee swarm on tree branch in eastern Arkansas.

Beekeepers are sometimes called to capture swarms that are cast by feral honey bees or from the hives of domestic beekeepers. Most beekeepers will remove a honeybee swarm for a small fee or maybe even free if they are nearby. Bee swarms can almost always be collected alive and relocated by a competent beekeeper or bee removal company. Extermination of a bee swarm is rarely necessary and discouraged if bee removal is possible.

There are various methods to capture a swarm. When the swarm first settles down and forms a cluster it is relatively easy to capture the swarm in a suitable box or nuc. One method that can be employed on a sunny day when the swarm is located on a lower branch or small tree is to put a white sheet under the swarm location. A nuc box is put on the sheet. The swarm is sprayed from the outside with a sugar solution (soaking the bees so they become too heavy to fly away) and then vigorously shaken off the branch. The main cluster, hopefully including the queen, will fall onto the white sheet and the bees will quickly go for the first dark entrance space that is in sight, which is the opening of the nuc. An organized march toward the opening will ensue and after 15 minutes the majority of bees will be inside the nuc. This capture method does not work at night.

If the swarm is too embroiled in its perch so it cannot be dropped into a box or sheet, a skep can be suspended over it and gentle smoke used to "herd" the swarm into the skep. Smoke is not recommended to calm a clustered swarm. Smoke will have the opposite effect on a clustered swarm as many bees will become agitated and fly about instead of settling down.

A bee vac can also be used.

=== Human behavior ===
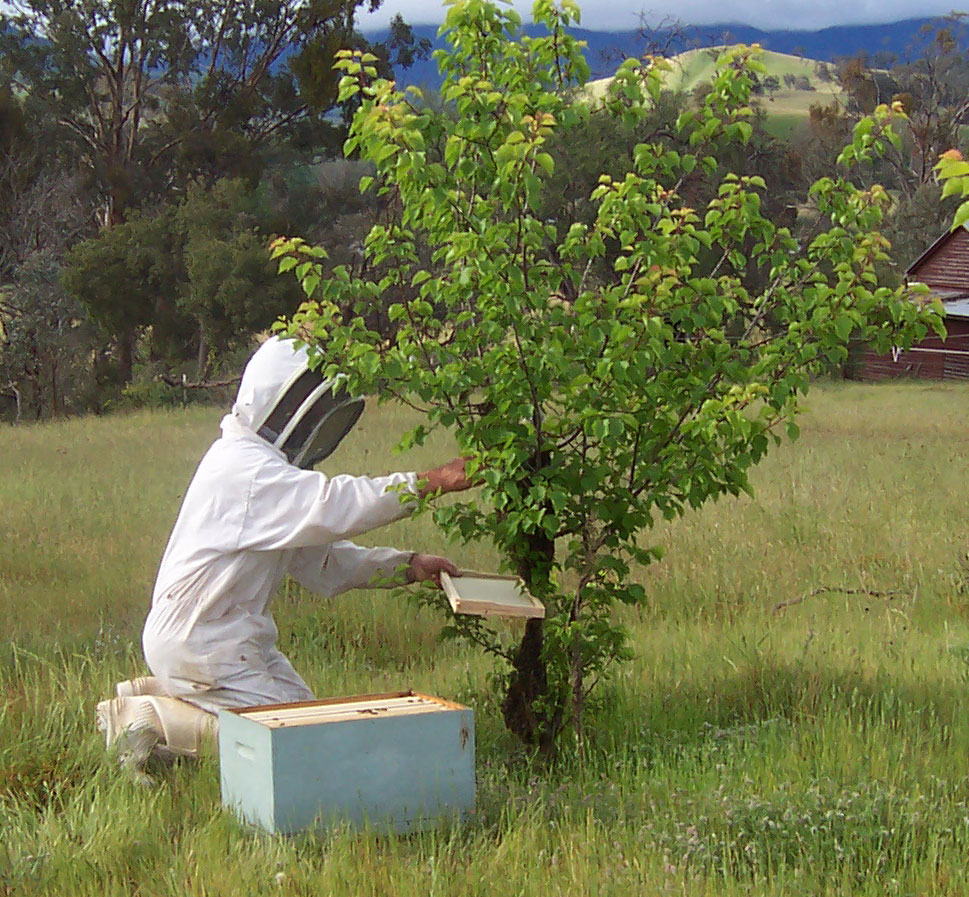
A beekeeper collecting a bee swarm.

A swarm of bees sometimes frightens people, though the bees are usually not aggressive at this stage of their life cycle. This is principally due to the swarming bees' lack of brood (developing bees) to defend and their interest in finding a new nesting location for their queen. This does not mean that bees from a swarm will not attack if they perceive a threat; however, most bees only attack in response to intrusions against their colony. Additionally, bees seldom swarm except when the position of the sun is direct and impressive. Swarm clusters, hanging from a tree branch, will move on and find a suitable nesting location in a day or two.

Encountering a bee swarm for the first time can be alarming. Bees tend to swarm near their hives or honeycombs, so if a swarm is visible then a nest is nearby. Swarms are usually not aggressive unless provoked, so it is important to keep a good distance from swarms in order to avoid provoking them.

Alternatively there are many human activities that disrupt bee swarms and their nesting sites. This includes the growth of urbanization and logging. These activities cause bees to lose their homes and become displaced. Furthermore, these and other human activities such as the use of pesticides impact the possible nectar sites for bees to get food and pollinate flowers.

== Urbanization influence on swarming bees ==
=== Ecological impact of urbanization ===
Urbanization is a significant anthropogenic change in an ecosystem. This causes a significant impact on wildlife. With bees decreasing in species richness and diversity compared to their rural counterparts. Despite this bees are more prevalent than other insects in the area as there are a lot more brought into the area by beekeepers. This along with bee friendly areas in the city allow for pollination of wildflowers and crops. Urbanization pose a threat of pathogenic diseases such as fungal parasite Nosema ceranae and the parasitic mite Varroa destructor which contribute to a loss of honey bees colonies. As a result, both managed and wild bees has declined in abundance over the centuries. Human encroachment such as agriculture, livestock management, deforestation inflict habitat loss and habitat fragmentation in bee colonies. Honey bees in urban environments vary in more cases than their natural environments. The change in setting also causes a change in the genome of the bees. It has been found that there is significant genetic variation between worker bees in urban environments compared to rural environments. A study by Patenković et al. demonstrated this difference by analyzing 82 worker bees and comparing it to 241 samples of rural bees from 46 different areas.

=== Urban presence of bees ===
Bees are typically known for being managed in apiaries with feral, wild, bees, assumed to have died from pathogens such as Varroa destructor which can decimate colonies if left untreated. Despite this researchers Bila Dubaic et al. have discovered numerous feral swarms in urban areas. Particularly in Belgrade, the capital of Serbia, an analysis over seven years uncovered a total of more than five hundred verified swarms reported by the public. Upon further analysis the feral bee swarm prevalence was higher in areas of greater population density. As about half the swarming and nesting sites involved urban architecture.

=== Genetic diversity ===
There is a significant amount of genetic diversity illustrated in swarming bees. This is highlighted when comparing feral bees in urban landscapes, managed colonies in urban landscapes and their rural counterparts. An analysis into this genetic diversity performed by Patenkovic et al. demonstrated this difference. It was found that not only did urban bees differ from their rural counterparts but in the same urban area the feral bees had genetic diversity from the managed colonies. Reasons for this include the small genetic pool that managed colonies breed from. Furthermore, the variation between urban and rural areas may be due to the low pesticide use that allows for greater floral diversity in urban areas. Overall, the urban environment, although not being as optimal as natural habitats, provides enough substitutes through viable foraging and nesting sites.
