= Bee removal =

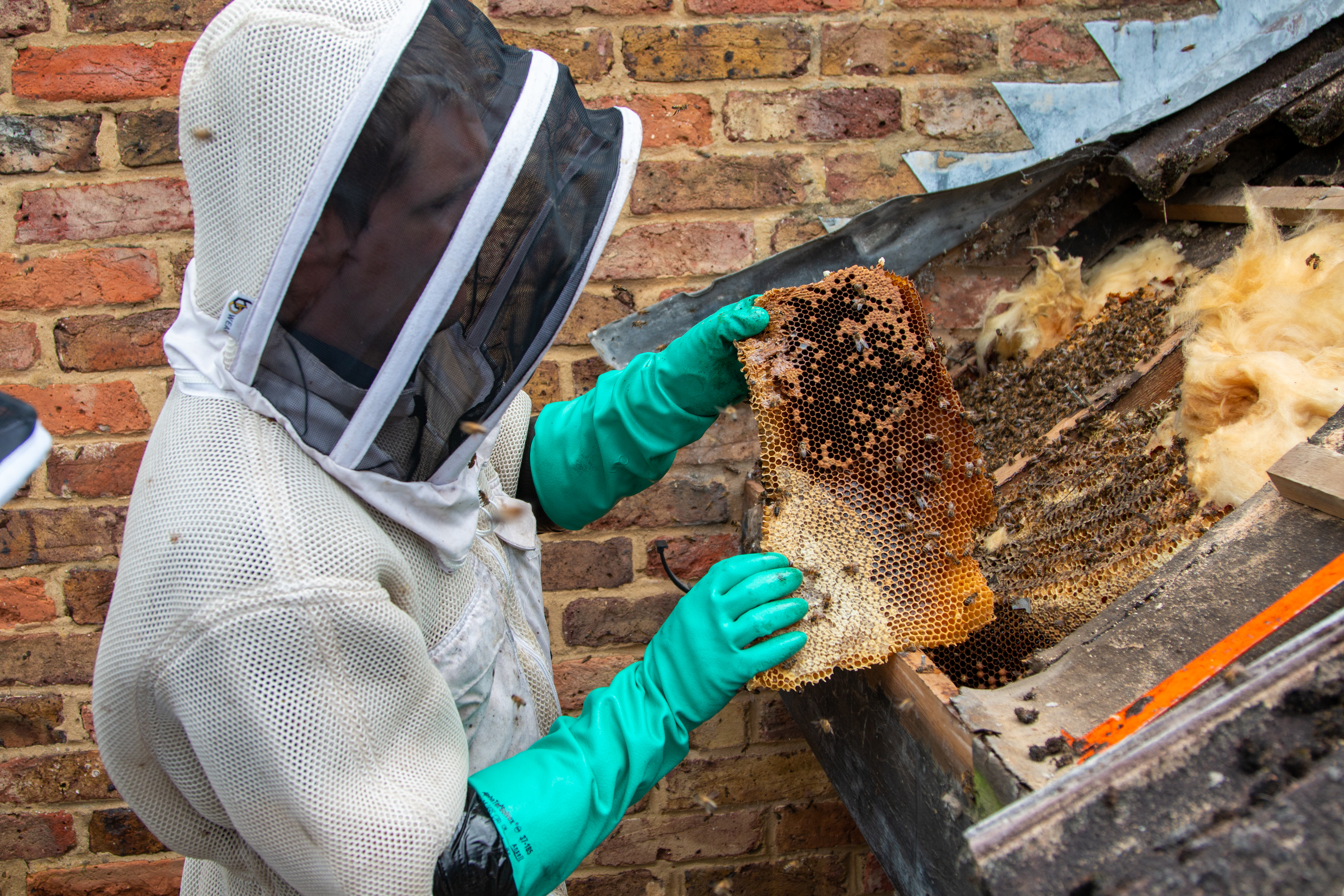
Removing bees from a soffit board

Bees are occasionally removed from locations. Professional services exist for this purpose. Since the honey bee is considered to be the most beneficial of all insect species, and bee colonies have potential economic value, professional bee removal typically involves a beekeeper transferring them to a new location where they can be cared for and used for crop pollination and for production of honey and beeswax. As such, bee removal has characteristics both of pest control and of beekeeping. Live bee removal or saving the bees can be accomplished by a local beekeeper who will then either keep the bees, sell them, or simply help whoever is requesting the bee removal to keep them in a hive box. However, not all beekeepers provide removal services. In bee removal, a bee vac can be used.

== Species and subspecies ==
Typically, the species of bee involved in removal is the western honey bee (Apis mellifera). However, the Africanized bee (hybridized with Apis mellifera scutellata) can also be removed safely, relocated, and kept alive. Bee removal professionals should not claim to be able to differentiate between the two types; this can only be done by laboratory analysis.
