= Russian honey bee =

Breed of bee

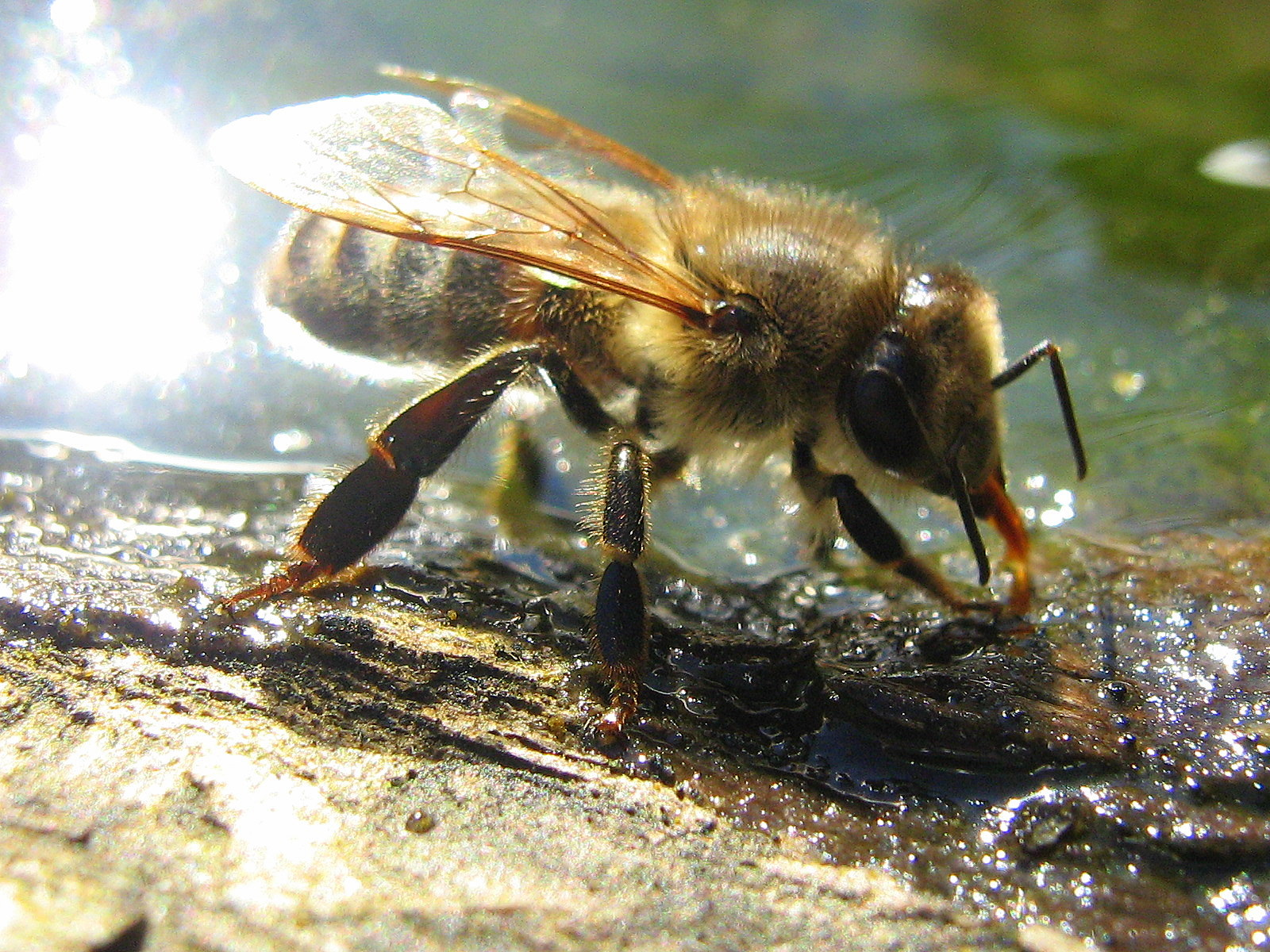
Worker

The Russian honeybee refers to honey bees (Apis mellifera) that originate in the Primorsky Krai region of Russia. This strain of bee was imported into the United States in 1997 by the USDA Agricultural Research Service's Honeybee Breeding, Genetics & Physiology Laboratory in Baton Rouge, Louisiana, in response to severe declines in bee populations caused by infestations of parasitic mites, and has been used in breeding programs to improve existing stocks. Many Russian queens openly mate with drones from various stock, creating colonies that are genetically hybrid. Some of these 'uncontrolled' hybrids may exhibit "increased aggressiveness, reduced honey production and a decrease in their ability to withstand mites and detrimental expressions of other traits as well."

== Breeding program ==
In conjunction with the staff at the Baton Rouge Bee Laboratory, the Russian Honey Bee Breeders Association (RHBA) was conceived in the late 1990s, and works to certify apiarists who maintain only pure-bred Russian honey bees. These stocks are bred and DNA tested for resistance to Varroa mites and increased honey production. Their charge is as follows: "The primary purpose of the Russian Honey Bee Breeders Association is to maintain and improve the genetic lines of Russian honey bees through prorogation and selective breeding." In order to ensure pure-bred stock, an isolated mating site, a barrier island in Louisiana, was chosen as the location for this program. This program is not static as management techniques and genetic stocks develop over time to improve the health and viability of Russian honeybee stocks.

=== Brood rearing and swarming ===
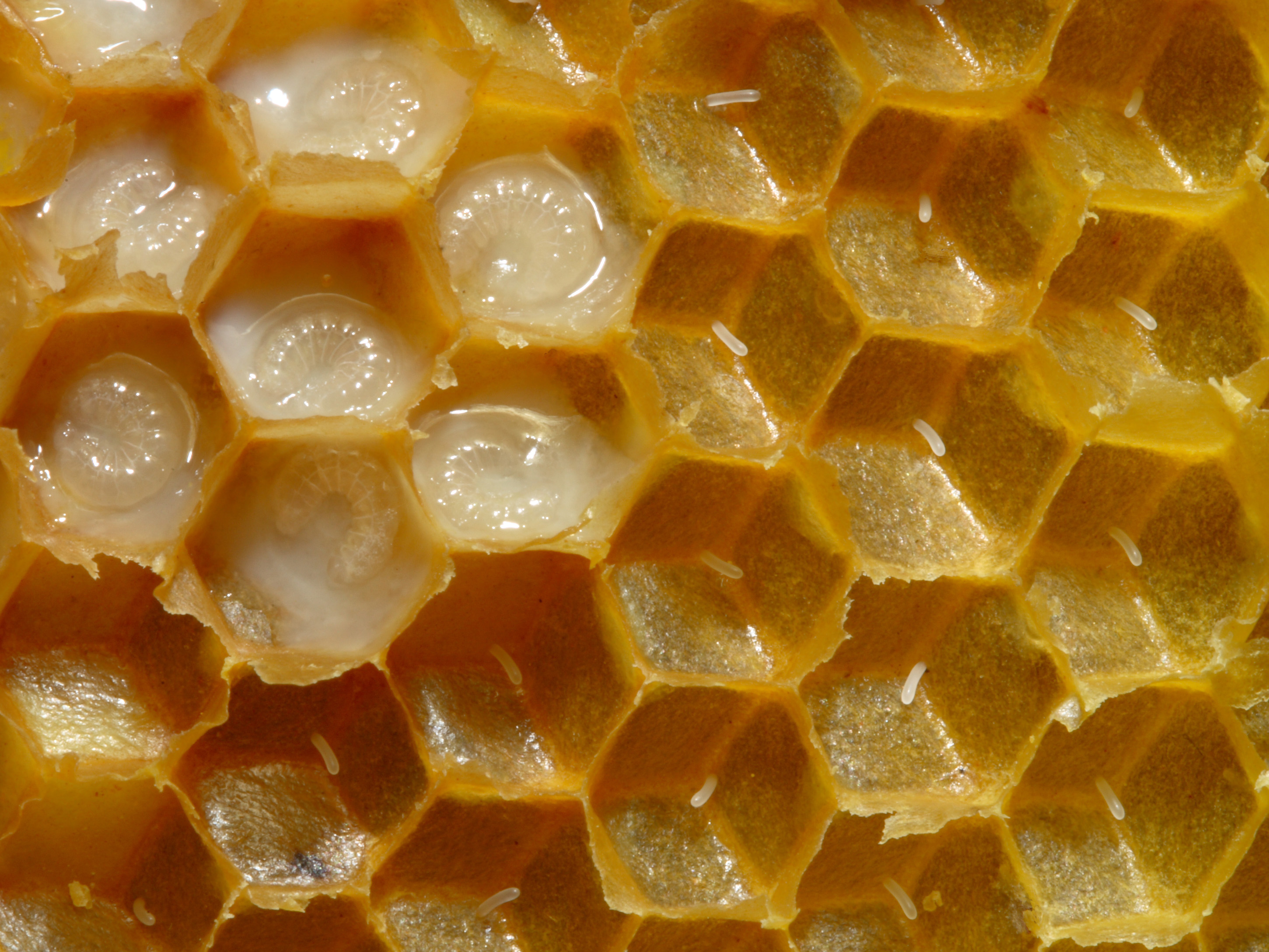
Brood

When first introduced to a colony, a Russian queen may take as long as 16 days to begin laying eggs. In addition to this delay as compared to other bee stocks, Russian queens can be difficult to requeen and take longer for their acceptance into a new hive, especially if they are being introduced into a hive of another stock. Once successfully introduced, Russian honeybees are better able to manage their population and increase their over-wintering ability than other honeybee types due to their breeding schedule. During pollen dearths, Russian honeybees decrease their brood production to ensure adequate food stocks for the hive.

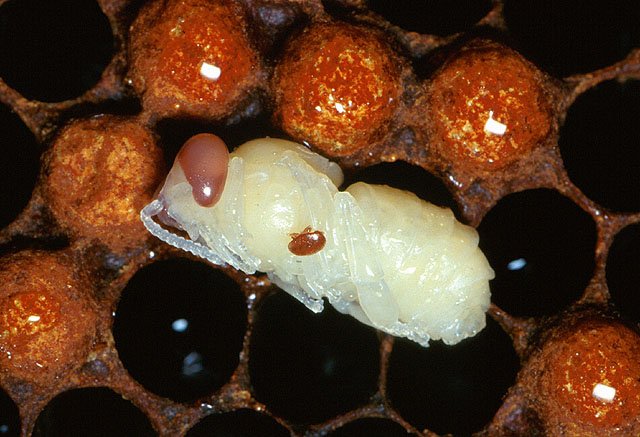
Adult female Varroa mite

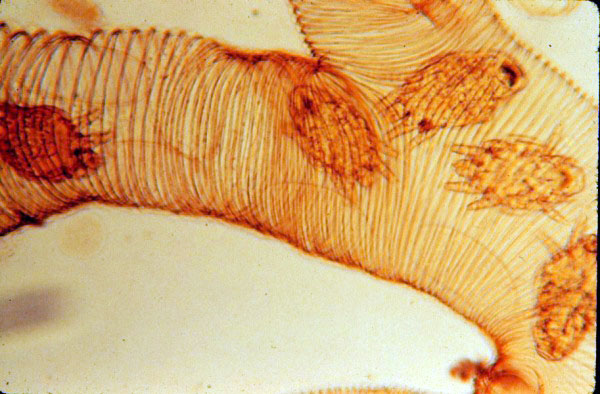
Tracheal mite

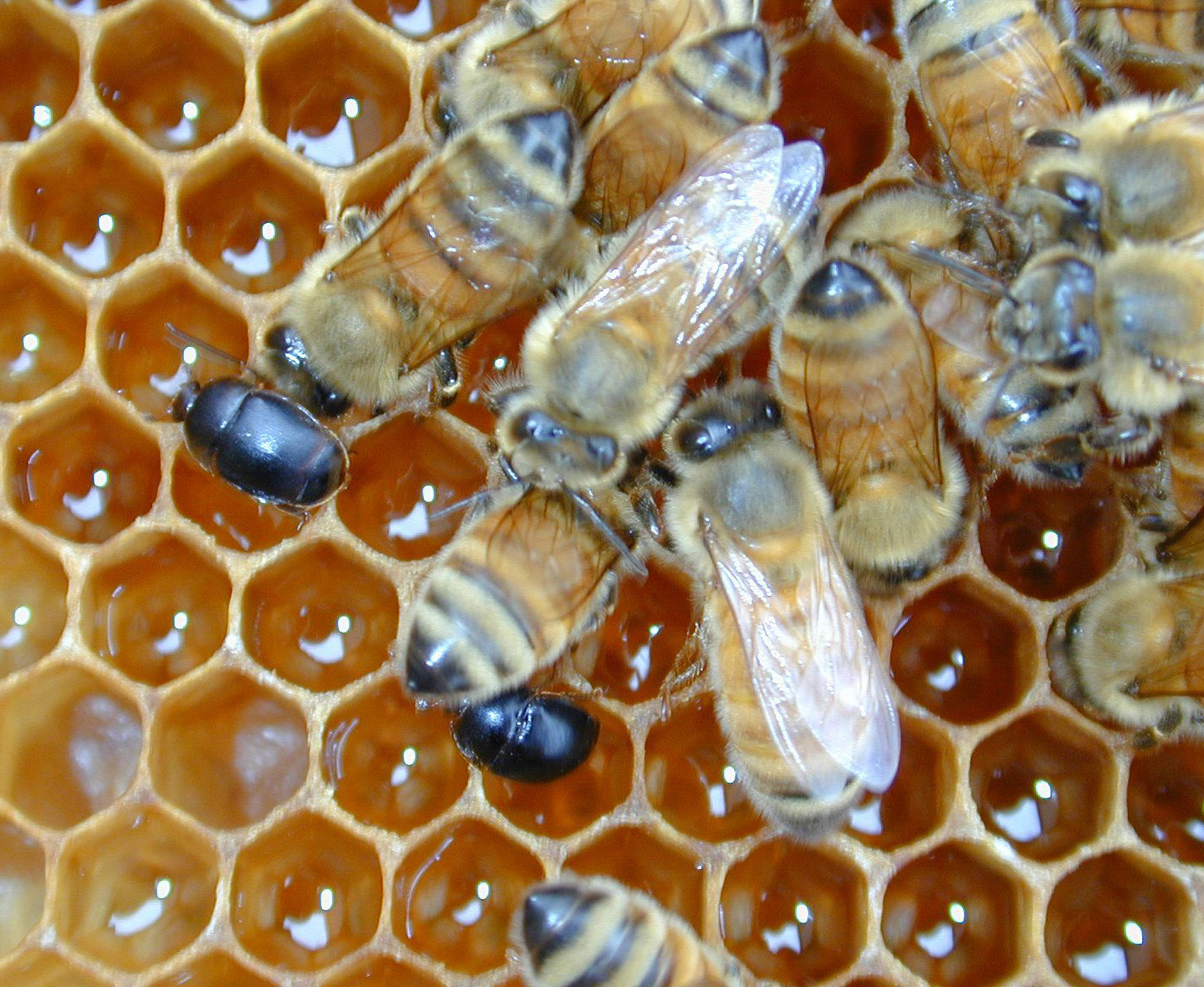
Small hive beetle

The Russian honeybees' quick response to environmental cues allows for better management of brood rearing, but can also create swarming issues. This is due to a rapid buildup of brood stock, which can lead to swarming if not managed properly. It is also a common trait for the Russian honeybee to create supersedure cells, but their presence does not necessarily indicate an impending swarm.

== Honey production ==
Multi-state field trials have shown that Russian honeybees either meet or exceed industry standards for honey production.

== Pests and diseases ==
=== Varroa mite ===
Russian honey bees have been proven to be more than twice as resistant to various parasitic mites than other honeybees. This strain occurs in the original native range of the Varroa mite, and selective pressure could have favored bees that exhibited aggressive behavior against colony-level mite infestations. Accordingly, experimental research has found that mite populations decline in colonies of pure Russian and of hybrid Russian-Italian bees. The mechanisms through which mite populations are controlled in these colonies include hygienic behavior towards mites, and possibly increased aggression towards mites. In addition, Russian honeybees are able to detect female Varroa mites within breeding cells, which they uncap leaving the mite exposed.

=== Tracheal mites ===
Russian honey bees also have been shown to resist infestation by the tracheal mite Acarapis woodi. This heritable trait is likely brought about through grooming behaviors of the bees.

=== Small hive beetle ===
Russian honeybees when compared to A. m. ligustica Italian honeybees, have been shown to exhibit heightened aggression toward small hive beetles (SHB), resulting in "fewer invading beetles, lower small hive beetle population through time, and lesser reproduction."
