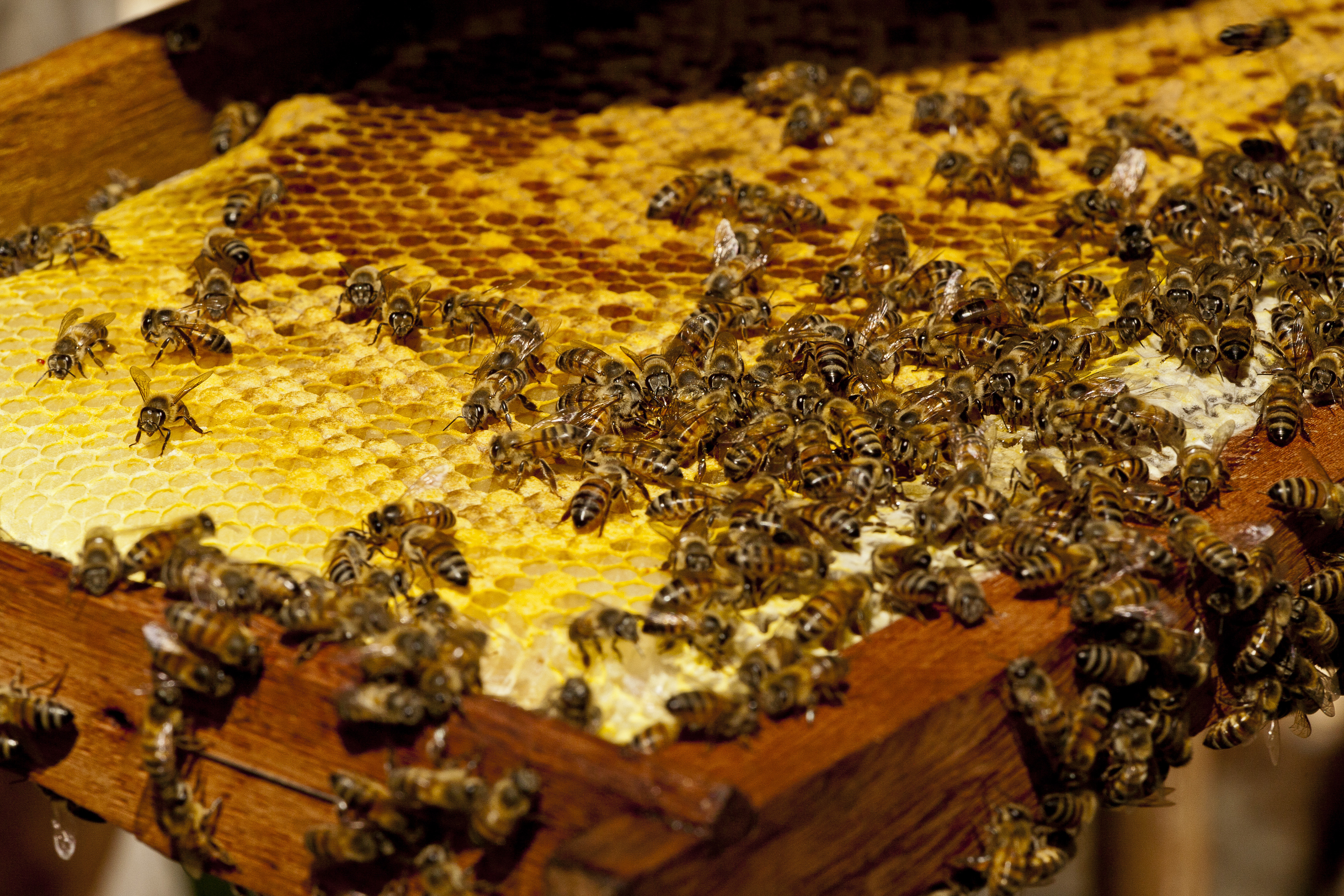

Scientific classification
- Kingdom: Animalia
- Phylum: Arthropoda
- Clade: Pancrustacea
- Class: Insecta
- Order: Hymenoptera
- Family: Apidae
- Tribe: Apini
- Genus: Apis
- Species: A. m. scutellata × A. mellifera

= Africanized bee =

Hybrid species of bee

The Africanized bee, also known as the Africanized honey bee (AHB) and colloquially as the "killer bee", is a hybrid of the western honey bee (Apis mellifera), produced originally by crossbreeding of the African honey bee (A. m. scutellata) with various European honey bee subspecies such as the Italian honey bee (A. m. ligustica) and the Iberian honey bee (A. m. iberiensis).

African honey bees were first introduced to Brazil in 1956 to increase honey production, but 26 swarms with their queens escaped from their experimental apiary in 1957. Since then, the hybrid has spread throughout South America and arrived in North America in 1985. Hives were found in southern Texas, United States, in 1990.

Africanized honey bees are typically much more defensive, react to disturbances faster, and chase people farther than other varieties of honey bees, up to 400 m (1,300 ft). They have killed some 1,000 humans, with victims receiving 10 times more stings than from European honey bees. They have also killed horses and other animals.

== History ==
There are 29 recognized subspecies of Apis mellifera based largely on geographic variations. All subspecies are cross-fertile. Geographic isolation led to numerous local adaptations. These adaptations include brood cycles synchronized with the bloom period of local flora, forming a winter cluster in colder climates, migratory swarming in Africa, enhanced (long-distance) foraging behavior in desert areas, and numerous other inherited traits.

The Africanized honey bees in the Western Hemisphere are descended from hives operated by biologist Warwick E. Kerr, who had interbred honey bees from Europe and southern Africa. Kerr was attempting to breed a strain of bees that would produce more honey in tropical conditions than the European strain of honey bee then in use throughout North, Central, and South America. The hives containing this particular African subspecies were housed at an apiary in the São Paulo State University Rio Claro campus, in the southeast of Brazil, and were noted to be especially defensive. These hives had been fitted with special excluder screens (called queen excluders) to prevent the larger queen bees and drones from leaving and mating with the local European bee population. According to Kerr, in October 1957 a visiting beekeeper, noticing that the queen excluders were interfering with the worker bees' movement, removed them, resulting in the accidental release of 26 Tanganyikan swarms of A. m. scutellata. Following this accidental release, the Africanized honey bee swarms spread out and crossbred with local European honey bee colonies.

The descendants of these colonies have since spread throughout the Americas, moving through the Amazon basin in the 1970s, crossing into Central America in 1982, and reaching Mexico in 1985. Because their movement through these regions was rapid and largely unassisted by humans, Africanized honey bees have earned the reputation of being a notorious invasive species. The prospect of killer bees arriving in the United States caused a media sensation in the late 1970s, inspired several horror movies, and sparked debate about the wisdom of humans altering entire ecosystems.

The first Africanized honey bees in the U.S. were discovered in 1985 at an oil field in the San Joaquin Valley of California. Bee experts theorized the colony had not traveled overland but instead "arrived hidden in a load of oil-drilling pipe shipped from South America." The first permanent colonies arrived in Texas from Mexico in 1990. In the Tucson region of Arizona, a study of trapped swarms in 1994 found that only 15 percent had been Africanized; this number had grown to 90 percent by 1997.

== Characteristics ==
Though Africanized honey bees display certain behavioral traits that make them less than desirable for commercial beekeeping, excessive defensiveness and swarming foremost, they have now become the dominant type of honey bee for beekeeping in Central and South America due to their genetic dominance as well as ability to out-compete their European counterpart, with some beekeepers asserting that they are superior honey producers and pollinators.

Africanized honey bees, as opposed to other Western bee types:

- Tend to swarm more frequently and go farther than other types of honey bees.
- Are more likely to migrate as part of a seasonal response to lowered food supply.
- Are more likely to "abscond"—the entire colony leaves the hive and relocates—in response to stress.
- Have greater defensiveness when in a resting swarm, compared to other honey bee types.
- Live more often in ground cavities than the European types.
- Guard the hive aggressively, with a larger alarm zone around the hive.
- Have a higher proportion of "guard" bees within the hive.
- Deploy in greater numbers for defense and pursue perceived threats over much longer distances from the hive.
- Cannot survive extended periods of forage deprivation, preventing introduction into areas with harsh winters or extremely dry late summers.
- Live in dramatically higher population densities. (Note: p. 403, "On highly attractive flowers in Parana and Sao Paulo, J. S. Moure (personal communication) reports up to 15 workers per m^{2} in areas without beekeeping.") (Note: p. 403, "The Brazilian bee changed this; the only quantitative data are from savanna (cerrado) areas in the states of Goias and Mato Grosso where Kerr (46) found an average of 107.5 colonies of feral Apis per km^{2}.")

== North American distribution ==
Spread over time

Africanized honey bees are considered an invasive species in the Americas. As of 2002, the Africanized honey bees had spread from Brazil south to northern Argentina and north to Central America, Trinidad (the West Indies), Mexico, Texas, Arizona, Nevada, New Mexico, Florida, and southern California. In June 2005, it was discovered that the bees had spread into southwest Arkansas. Their expansion in eastern Texas stopped for a time, possibly due to the large number of European honey bee hives in the area. However, discoveries of the Africanized honey bees in southern Louisiana show that they have gotten past this barrier, or have come as a swarm aboard a ship.

On 11 September 2007, Commissioner Bob Odom of the Louisiana Department of Agriculture and Forestry said that Africanized honey bees had established themselves in the New Orleans area. In February 2009, Africanized honey bees were found in southern Utah. The bees had spread into eight counties in Utah, as far north as Grand and Emery Counties by May 2017.

In October 2010, a 73-year-old man was killed by a swarm of Africanized honey bees while clearing brush on his south Georgia property, as determined by Georgia's Department of Agriculture. In 2012, Tennessee state officials reported that a colony was found for the first time in a beekeeper's colony in Monroe County in the eastern part of the state. In June 2013, 62-year-old Larry Goodwin of Moody, Texas, was killed by a swarm of Africanized honey bees.

In May 2014, Colorado State University confirmed that bees from a swarm that had aggressively attacked an orchardist near Palisade, in west-central Colorado, were from an Africanized honey bee hive. The hive was subsequently destroyed.

In tropical climates, they effectively out-compete European honey bees and, at their peak rate of expansion, they spread north at almost two kilometers (about 1¼ miles) a day. There were discussions about slowing the spread by placing large numbers of docile European-strain hives in strategic locations, particularly at the Isthmus of Panama. Still, various national and international agricultural departments could not prevent the bees' expansion. Current knowledge of the genetics of these bees suggests that such a strategy, had it been tried, would not have been successful.

As the Africanized honey bee migrates farther north, colonies continue to interbreed with European honey bees. In a study conducted in Arizona in 2004 it was observed that swarms of Africanized honey bees could take over weakened European honey bee hives by invading the hive, then killing the European queen and establishing their own queen. There are now relatively stable geographic zones in which either Africanized honey bees dominate, a mix of Africanized and European honey bees is present, or only non-Africanized honey bees are found, as in the southern portions of South America or northern North America.

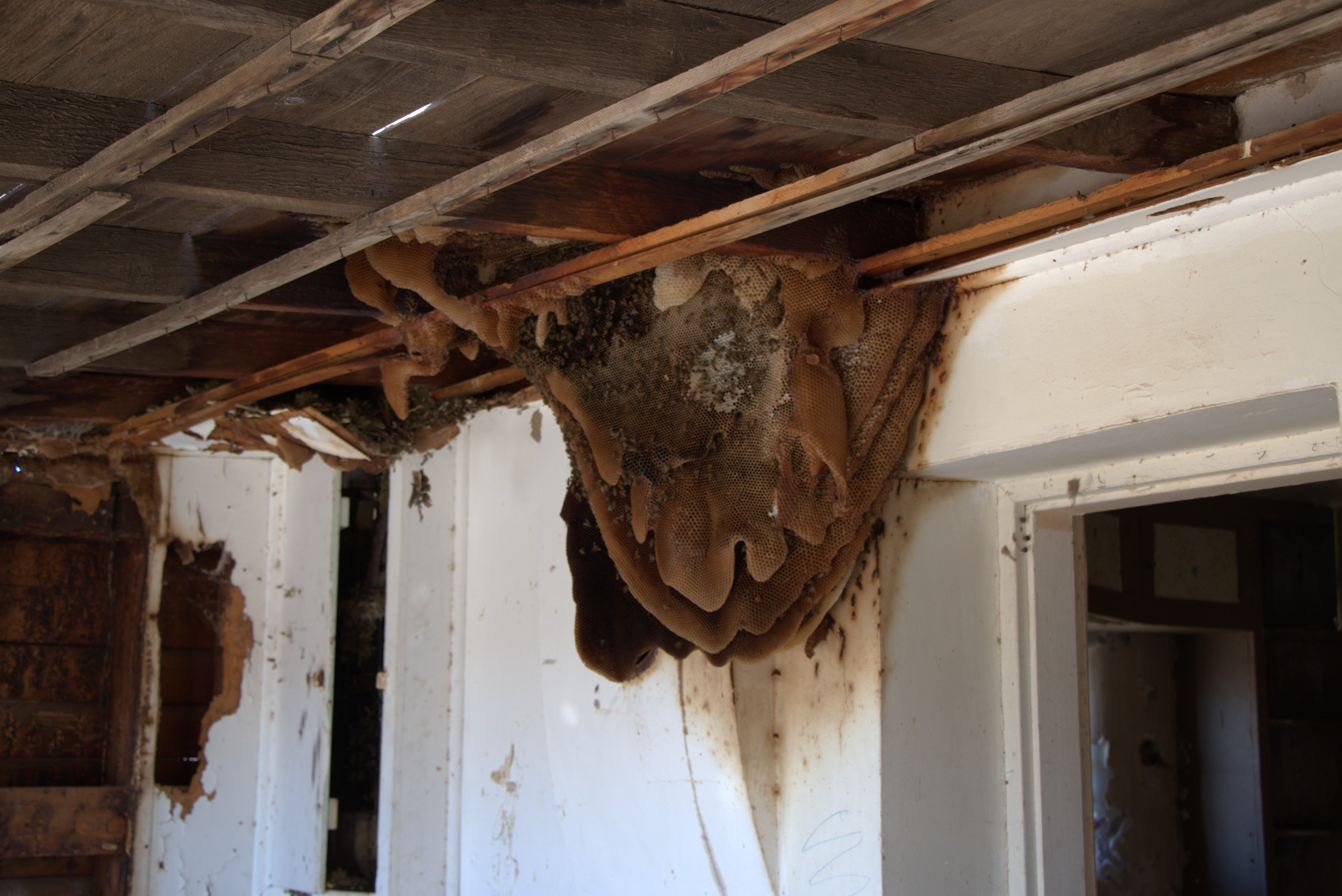
Hive on Gila River Indian Community land in Arizona

African honey bees abscond (abandon the hive and any food store to start over in a new location) more readily than European honeybees. This is not necessarily a severe loss in tropical climates, where plants bloom year-round. Still, in more temperate climates, it can leave the colony with insufficient stores to survive the winter. Thus, Africanized honey bees are expected to pose a hazard primarily in the southern states of the United States, extending as far north as the Chesapeake Bay in the eastern United States. The cold-weather limits of the Africanized honey bee have driven some professional bee breeders from Southern California into the harsher wintering locales of the northern Sierra Nevada and southern Cascade Range. This is a more difficult area to prepare bees for early pollination placement, as is required for the production of almonds. The reduced available winter forage in northern California means that bees must be fed for early spring buildup.

The arrival of the Africanized honey bee in Central America is threatening the traditional craft of keeping Melipona stingless bees in log gums. However, they do not interbreed or directly compete with each other. The honey production from an individual hive of Africanized honey bees can be as high as 100 kilograms (220 lb). This value exceeds the much smaller 3–5 kilograms (7–11 lb) of the various Melipona stingless bee species. Thus, economic pressures are forcing beekeepers to switch from the traditional stingless bees to the new reality of the Africanized honey bee. Whether this will lead to the extinction of the former is unknown. Still, they are well adapted to life in the wild, and many indigenous plants that the Africanized honey bees do not visit, so the fate of the Melipona bees remains to be seen.

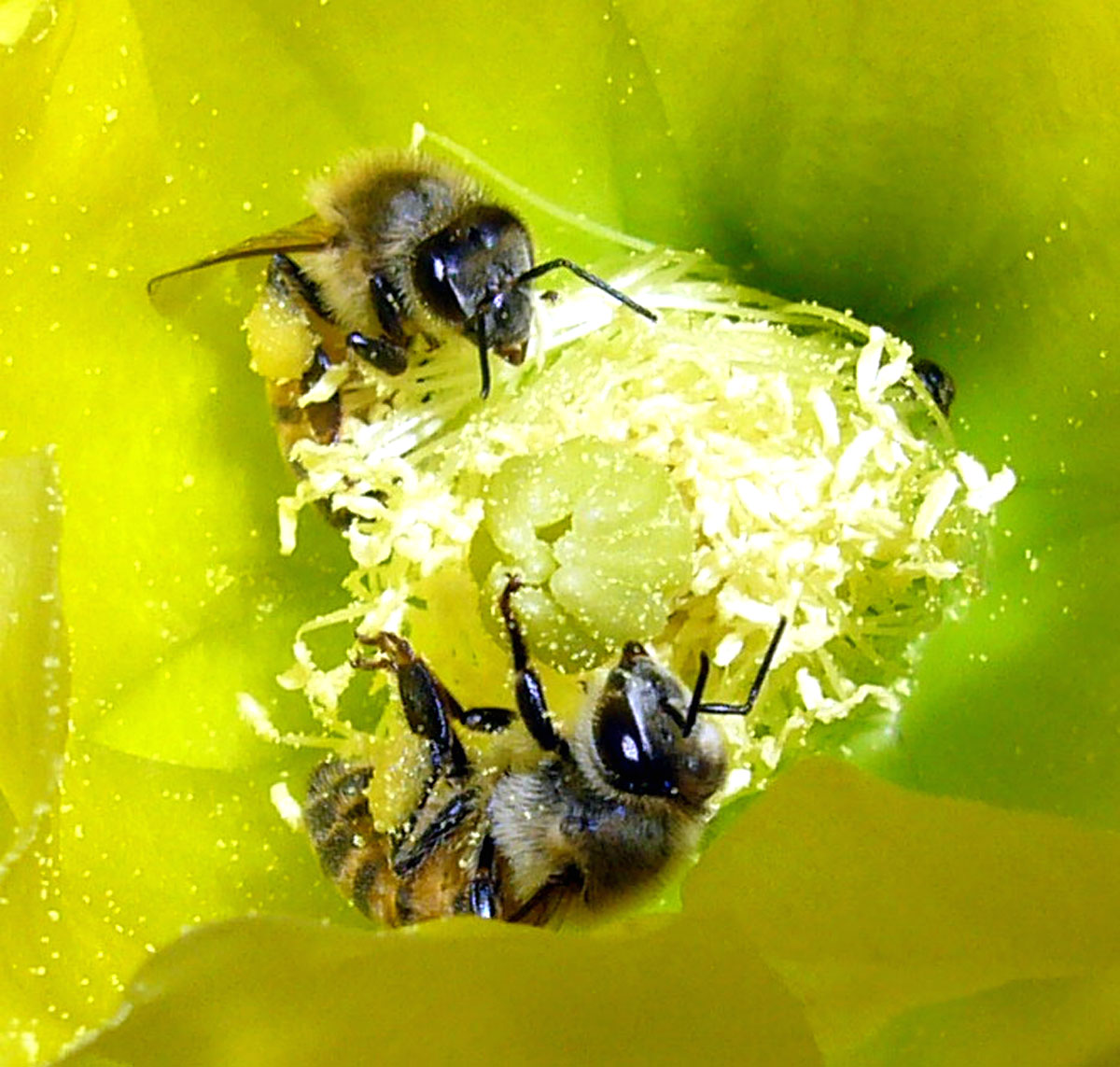
Gathering pollen, Engelmann's prickly pear, Mojave Desert

== Defensive behavior and disease resistance ==
Africanized honey bees are generally considered to be more defensive than European honey bees. Yet, research has demonstrated that defensive behaviour can differ from colony to colony and can also vary throughout the year. In a 2023 study carried out in Southern California, feral Africanized honey bee colonies were compared with managed European honey bee colonies from May to November. The researchers recorded the defensive reactions during hive inspections, noting how often the bees came towards the observer, tried to sting, and followed the observer away from the hive. In May both types of colony displayed fairly low levels of defensive behaviour. Nevertheless, defensive behaviour increased in the Africanized colonies as the year went on, whereas most of the figures for the European colonies stayed relatively unchanged. The results indicate that defensive behaviour can be affected by seasonal changes and is not always the same throughout the year.

=== Frontiers ===
The researchers also looked into whether the fraction of African ancestry in a colony could be used to predict its defensive level. They discovered that there was no significant link between genetic ancestry and defensive behaviour. The Africanized colonies that were studied were also less defensive than certain populations previously described in earlier research carried out in Latin America. The researchers believed that genetic differences among populations might account for these results, even though they had not identified a single cause. The findings show that defensive behaviour varies among honey bee populations and that African ancestry by itself does not determine how defensive a colony will be.

There are also differences in defensive behaviour among colonies of Africanized honey bees in Argentina. In a 2023 study, nine daughter colonies that had been produced from a mother colony showing tolerance to the parasitic mite Varroa destructor were examined. The researchers noted a number of defensive behaviours, such as moving across the honeycomb, flying during hive inspections, stinging reactions, and clustering on the comb. These observations were then compiled into a Defensive Behaviour Index in order to compare the colonies. The results indicated significant differences in a number of defensive behaviours between the mother and the daughter colonies. Genetic analysis also found differences between colonies that showed contrasting levels of defensiveness. The researchers believed that their findings could assist in shaping future breeding programmes designed at selecting Africanized honey bee colonies with traits that are advantageous to beekeeping, such as reduced defensiveness.

==== PubMed Central ====
Genetic ancestry has likewise been looked into in connection with parasites and viruses that affect honey bees. In a 2022 study, 365 honey bee colonies from the subtropical and temperate areas of Mexico were examined, with the colonies having mainly African ancestry being compared to those having mainly European ancestry. It was found that the colonies with mainly European ancestry had higher levels of the mite Varroa destructor, the deformed wing virus, and the black queen cell virus. The study revealed no significant climate-related influence on the amounts of these parasites and viruses. Nevertheless, the results varied depending on the particular pathogen under examination and therefore cannot be seen as proof that African ancestry confers resistance to all diseases of honey bees.

In general, research shows that Africanized honey bee colonies differ in their defensive behaviour and the way they react to some parasites and viruses. The fact that there are such differences proves that features like defensiveness and resistance to disease are complex characteristics and should therefore be looked at individually. Further research into the genetic variation among colonies could help to increase our understanding of honey bee biology and assist breeding and management practices intended at keeping colonies healthier and more manageable.

== Foraging behavior ==
Africanized honey bees begin foraging at young ages and harvest a greater quantity of pollen compared to their European counterparts (Apis mellifera ligustica). This may be linked to the high reproductive rate of the Africanized honey bee, which requires pollen to feed its greater number of larvae. Africanized honey bees are also sensitive to sucrose at lower concentrations. This adaptation causes foragers to harvest resources with low sucrose concentrations, including water, pollen, and unconcentrated nectar. A study comparing A. m. scutellata and A. m. ligustica published by Fewell and Bertram in 2002 suggests that the differential evolution of this suite of behaviors is due to the different environmental pressures experienced by African and European subspecies.

=== Proboscis extension responses ===
Honey bee sensitivity to different concentrations of sucrose is determined by a reflex known as the proboscis extension response (PER). Different honey bee species that employ different foraging behaviors will vary in the sucrose concentration that elicits their proboscis extension response.

For example, European honey bees (Apis mellifera ligustica) forage at older ages and harvest less pollen and more concentrated nectar. The differences in resources collected during harvesting result from the European honey bee's sensitivity to sucrose at higher concentrations.

=== Evolution ===
The differences in a variety of behaviors between different species of honey bees are the result of a directional selection that acts upon several foraging behavior traits as a common entity. Selection in natural populations of honey bees show that positive selection of sensitivity to low concentrations of sucrose are linked to foraging at younger ages and collecting resources low in sucrose. Positive selection for sensitivity to high sucrose concentrations was linked to foraging at older ages and to collecting resources with higher sucrose content. Additionally, of interest, "change in one component of a suite of behaviors appear[s] to direct change in the entire suite." (Note: Proximate causes: There are multiple ways of considering the cause of directional selection on this set of foraging behaviors in honey bees. A proximate factor is developmental and influential on behavior within the lifetime of an organism. Neurological and developmental differences lead to directional selection and changes in the set of foraging behaviors between generations of honey bees. Levels of stress, as measured by octopamine, are one such developmental contributing factor (Pankiw, 2003).) (Note: Ultimate causes: An ultimate factor explains long-term evolutionary advantages of behavior in an organism (Davies, 2012). § Proboscis extension responses to different concentrations of sucrose is a genotypic trait; the genes vary with respect to the sucrose concentration level at which proboscis extension response is manifested. Natural selection can directly shift the set of foraging behaviors by acting on the distribution of these genes within the honey bee population (Pankiw, 2003).)

When resource density is low in Africanized honey bee habitats, the bees must harvest a wider variety of resources because they cannot afford to be selective. Honey bees that are genetically inclined towards resources high in sucrose, such as concentrated nectar, will not be able to sustain themselves in harsher environments. The noted § Proboscis extension responses to low sucrose concentration in Africanized honey bees may be a result of selective pressure in times of scarcity when their survival depends on their attraction to low-quality resources.

== Morphology and genetics ==
The popular term "killer bee" has only limited scientific meaning today because there is no generally accepted fraction of genetic contribution used to establish a cut-off between a "killer" honey bee and an ordinary honey bee. Government and scientific documents prefer "Africanized honey bee" as an accepted scientific taxon.

=== Morphological tests ===
Although the native African honey bees (Apis mellifera scutellata) are smaller and build smaller comb cells than the European honey bees, their hybrids are not smaller. Africanized honey bees have slightly shorter wings, which can only be reliably identified through statistical analysis of micro-measurements from a substantial sample.

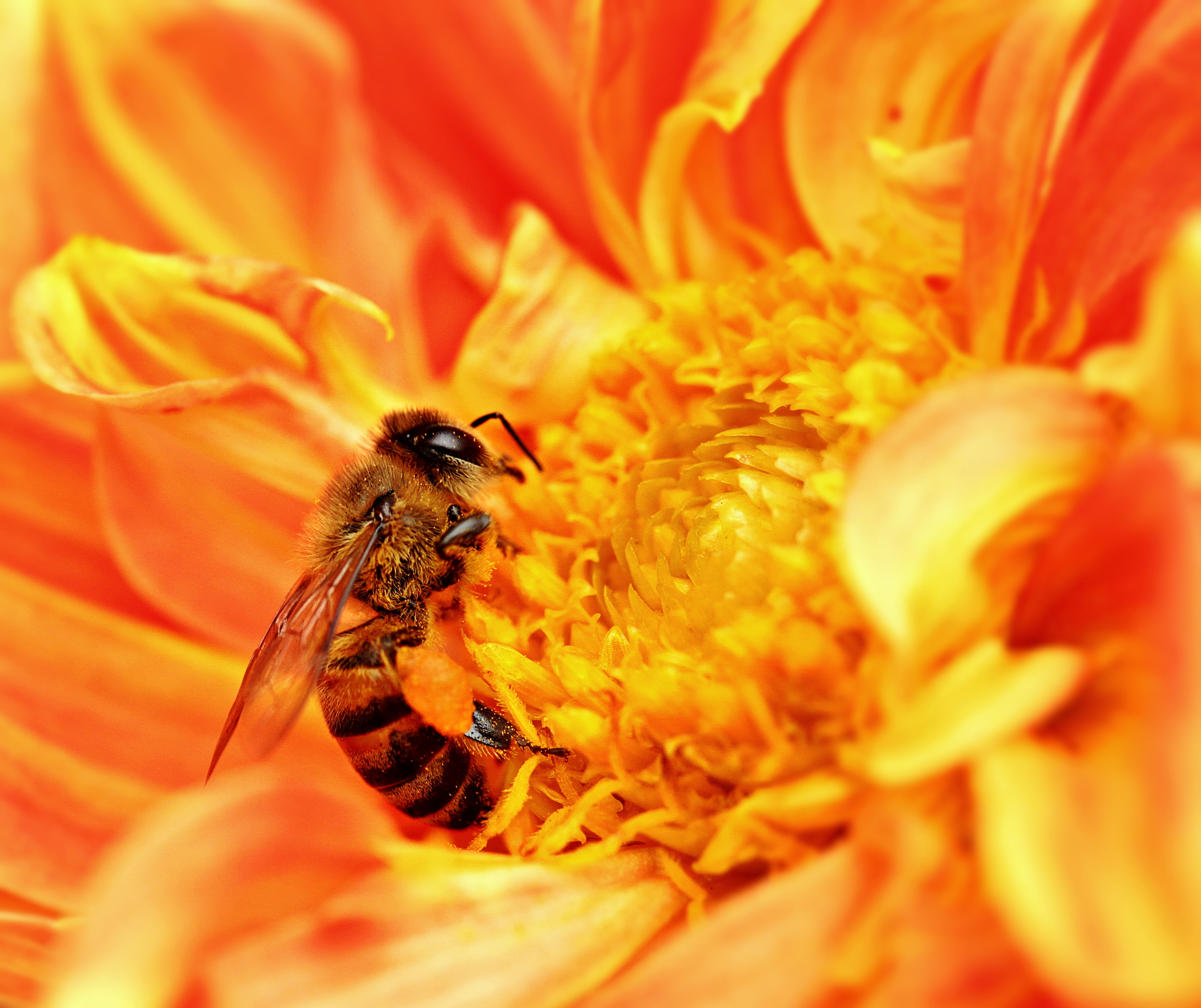
Compare A. m. scutellata

One of the problems with this test is that there are other subspecies, such as A. m. iberiensis, which also have shortened wings. This trait is hypothesized to derive from ancient hybrid haplotypes thought to be linked to evolutionary lineages from Africa. Some belong to A. m. intermissa, but others have an indeterminate origin; the Egyptian honeybee (Apis mellifera lamarckii), present in small numbers in the southeastern U.S., has the same morphology.

=== DNA tests ===
Currently, testing techniques have shifted away from external measurements toward DNA analysis, but this means the test can only be performed by a sophisticated laboratory. Molecular diagnostics using the mitochondrial DNA (mtDNA) cytochrome b gene can differentiate A. m. scutellata from other A. mellifera lineages, though mtDNA only allows one to detect Africanized colonies that have Africanized queens and not colonies where a European queen has mated with Africanized drones. A test based on single nucleotide polymorphisms was created in 2015 to detect Africanized bees based on the proportion of African and European ancestry.

=== Western variants ===
The western honey bee is native to Europe, Asia, and Africa. As of the early 1600s, it was introduced to North America, with subsequent introductions of other European subspecies 200 years later. Since then, they have spread throughout the Americas. The 29 subspecies can be assigned to one of four major branches based on Ruttner's work, which was subsequently confirmed by mitochondrial DNA analysis. African subspecies are assigned to branch A, northwestern European subspecies to branch M, southwestern European subspecies to branch C, and Mideast subspecies to branch O. The subspecies are grouped and listed. There are still regions with localized variations that may become identified subspecies in the near future, such as A. m. pomonella from the Tian Shan Mountains, which would be included in the Mideast subspecies branch.

The western honey bee is the third insect whose genome has been mapped, and is unusual in having very few transposons. According to the scientists who analyzed its genetic code, the western honey bee originated in Africa and spread to Eurasia in two ancient migrations. They have also discovered that the number of genes in the honey bee related to smell outnumber those for taste. The genome sequence revealed several groups of genes, particularly the genes related to circadian rhythms, were closer to vertebrates than other insects. Genes related to enzymes that control other genes were also vertebrate-like.

=== African variants ===
There are two lineages of the African subspecies (Apis mellifera scutellata) in the Americas: actual matrilineal descendants of the original escaped queens and a much smaller number that are Africanized through hybridization. The matrilineal descendants carry African mtDNA, but partially European nuclear DNA, while the honey bees that are Africanized through hybridization carry European mtDNA, and partially African nuclear DNA. The matrilineal descendants are in the vast majority. This is supported by DNA analyses performed on the bees as they spread northwards; those that were at the "vanguard" were over 90% African mtDNA, indicating an unbroken matriline, but after several years in residence in an area interbreeding with the local European strains, as in Brazil, the overall representation of African mtDNA drops to some degree. However, these latter hybrid lines (with European mtDNA) do not appear to propagate themselves well or persist. Population genetics analysis of Africanized honey bees in the United States, using a maternally inherited genetic marker, found 12 distinct mitotypes, and the amount of genetic variation observed supports the idea that there have been multiple introductions of AHB into the United States.

A more recent publication reports on the genetic admixture of Africanized honey bees in Brazil. The small number of honey bees with African ancestry introduced to Brazil in 1956, which dispersed, hybridized with existing managed populations of European origin, and quickly spread across much of the Americas, exemplifies a massive biological invasion, as discussed earlier in this article. Here, they analysed whole-genome sequences from 32 Africanized honey bees sampled across Brazil to study the effect of this process on genomic diversity. By comparison with ancestral populations from Europe and Africa, they infer that these samples had 84% African ancestry, with the remainder from western European populations. However, this proportion varied across the genome, and they identified signals of positive selection in regions with high European ancestry proportions. These observations are largely driven by a large, gene-rich 1.4 Mbp segment on chromosome 11, where European haplotypes are present at a significantly elevated frequency and likely confer an adaptive advantage in the Africanized honey bee population.

== Consequences of selection ==
The chief difference between the European subspecies of honey bees kept by beekeepers and the African ones is attributable to both selective breeding and natural selection. By selecting only the gentlest, most non-defensive subspecies, beekeepers have, over centuries, eliminated the more defensive ones and created several subspecies suitable for apiculture.

In Central and southern Africa, there was formerly no tradition of beekeeping, and hives were destroyed to harvest honey, pollen, and larvae. The bees adapted to the climate of Sub-Saharan Africa, including prolonged droughts. Having to defend themselves against aggressive insects such as ants and wasps, as well as voracious animals like the honey badger, African honey bees evolved as a subspecies group of highly defensive bees unsuitable by many metrics for domestic use.

As Africanized honey bees migrate into regions, hives with an old or absent queen can become hybridized by crossbreeding. The aggressive Africanized drones outcompete European drones for a newly developed queen of the hive, ultimately resulting in the hybridization of the existing colony. Requeening, a term for replacing the older existing queen with a new, already fertilized one, can avoid hybridization in apiaries. As a prophylactic measure, most beekeepers in North America requeen their hives annually to maintain strong colonies and avoid hybridization.

=== Defensiveness ===
Africanized honey bees exhibit far greater defensiveness than European honey bees and are more likely to deal with a perceived threat by attacking in large swarms. These hybrids have been known to pursue a perceived threat for a distance of well over 500 meters (1,640 ft).

The venom of an Africanized honey bee is the same as that of a European honey bee, but since the former tends to sting in far greater numbers, deaths from them are naturally more numerous than from European honey bees. While allergies to the European honey bee may cause death, complications from Africanized honey bee stings are usually not caused by allergies to their venom. Humans stung many times by Africanized honey bees can experience serious side effects, including skin inflammation, dizziness, headaches, weakness, edema, nausea, diarrhea, and vomiting. Some cases even progress to affecting different body systems by causing increased heart rates, respiratory distress, and even renal failure. Africanized honey bee sting cases can become very serious, but they remain relatively rare and are often limited to accidental discovery in highly populated areas.

== Impact on humans ==
=== Fear factor ===
The public widely fears the Africanized honey bee, a reaction that has been amplified by sensationalist movies (such as The Swarm) and some of the media reports. Stings from Africanized honey bees kill, on average, two or three people per year.

As the Africanized honey bee spreads through Florida, a densely populated state, officials worry that public fear may force misguided efforts to combat them:

News reports of mass stinging attacks will promote concern and in some cases panic and anxiety, and cause citizens to demand responsible agencies and organizations to take action to help ensure their safety. We anticipate increased pressure from the public to ban beekeeping in urban and suburban areas. This action would be counter-productive. Beekeepers maintaining managed colonies of domestic European bees are our best defense against an area becoming saturated with AHB. These managed bees are filling an ecological niche that would soon be occupied by less desirable colonies if it were vacant.

— Florida African Bee Action Plan

=== Misconceptions ===
Killer bee is a term frequently used in media, such as movies, to describe aggressive behavior or an active attempt to attack humans. Africanized honey bee is considered a more descriptive term in part because their behavior is increased defensiveness compared to European honey bees that can exhibit similar defensive behaviors when disturbed.

The sting of the Africanized honey bee is no more potent than that of any other variety of honey bee. Although they are similar in appearance to European honey bees, they tend to be slightly smaller and darker in color. Although Africanized honey bees do not actively search for humans to attack, they are more dangerous because they are more easily provoked, quicker to attack in greater numbers, and then pursue the perceived threat farther, for as much as a quarter of a mile (400 metres).

While studies have shown that Africanized honey bees can infiltrate European honey bee colonies and kill and replace their queen (thus usurping the hive), this is less common than other methods of usurping the hive. Wild and managed colonies will sometimes be seen to fight over honey stores during the dearth (periods when plants are not flowering). Still, this behavior should not be confused with the aforementioned activity. The most common way a European honey bee hive becomes Africanized is through crossbreeding during a new queen's mating flight. Studies have consistently shown that Africanized drones are more numerous, stronger, and faster than their European cousins and are therefore able to out-compete them during these mating flights. The result of mating between Africanized drones and European queens is almost always Africanized offspring.

== Impact on apiculture ==
In areas of suitable temperate climate, the survival traits of Africanized honey bee colonies help them outperform European honey bee colonies. They also return later and work under conditions that often keep European honey bees hive-bound. This is why they have gained a reputation as superior honey producers, and beekeepers who have learned to adapt their management techniques now seem to prefer them to their European counterparts. Studies show that in areas of Florida that contain Africanized honey bees, honey production is higher than in areas where they do not live. It is also becoming apparent that Africanized honey bees have another advantage over European honey bees in that they seem to show a higher resistance to several health issues, including parasites such as Varroa destructor, some fungal diseases like chalkbrood, and even the mysterious colony collapse disorder which was plaguing beekeepers in the early 2000s. Despite its negative factors, the Africanized honey bee might ultimately prove a boon to apiculture.

=== Queen management ===
In areas where Africanized honey bees are well established, bought and pre-fertilized (i.e., mated) European queens can be used to maintain a hive's European genetics and behavior. However, this practice can be expensive, since these queens must be bought and shipped from breeder apiaries in areas completely free of Africanized honey bees, such as the northern U.S. states or Hawaii. As such, this is generally impractical for most commercial beekeepers outside the U.S., and it is one of the main reasons Central and South American beekeepers have had to learn to manage and work with the existing Africanized honey bee. Any effort to crossbreed virgin European queens with Africanized drones will result in the offspring exhibiting Africanized traits; only 26 swarms escaped in 1957, and nearly 60 years later there does not appear to be a noticeable lessening of the typical Africanized characteristics.

=== Gentleness ===
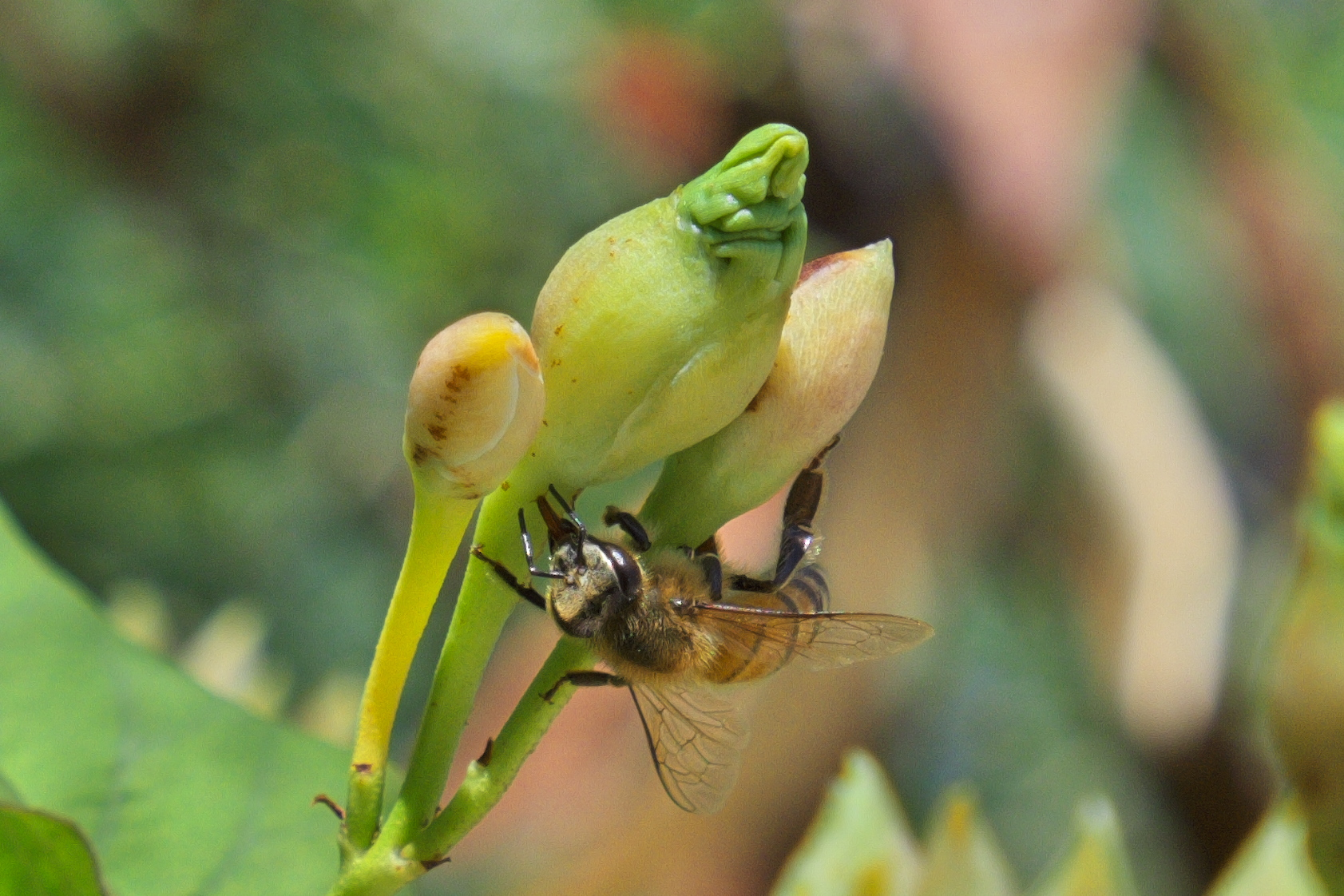
A Puerto Rican Africanized Bee, using its proboscis.

Not all Africanized honey bee hives display the typical hyper-defensive behavior, which may provide bee breeders a point to begin breeding a gentler stock (gAHBs). Work has been done in Brazil towards this end. Still, to maintain these traits, it is necessary to develop a queen-breeding and mating facility to requeen colonies and prevent the reintroduction of unwanted genes or characteristics through unintended crossbreeding with feral colonies. In Puerto Rico, some bee colonies are already showing gentler behavior. This is believed to be because the gentler bees contain genetic material more similar to that of the European honey bee, although they also contain Africanized honey bee material. This degree of aggressiveness is surprisingly almost unrelated to individual genetics – instead being almost entirely determined by the entire hive's proportion of aggression genetics.

=== Safety ===
While bee incidents are much less common than during the first wave of Africanized honey bee colonization, this is largely due to improved bee management techniques. Prominent among these are locating bee-yards much farther from human habitation, creating barriers to keep livestock at a sufficient distance to prevent interaction, and educating the general public on how to properly react when feral colonies are encountered and which resources to contact. The Africanized honey bee is now considered the honey bee of choice for beekeeping in Brazil.

== Impact on pets and livestock ==
Africanized honey bees are a threat to outdoor pets, especially mammals. The most detailed information available pertains to dogs.

Less is known about livestock as victims. There is a widespread consensus that cattle suffer occasional Africanized honey bee attacks in Brazil, but there is little relevant documentation. It appears that cows sustain hundreds of stings if they are attacked, but can survive such injuries.

== See also ==
- Bee removal
