= Émile Warré =

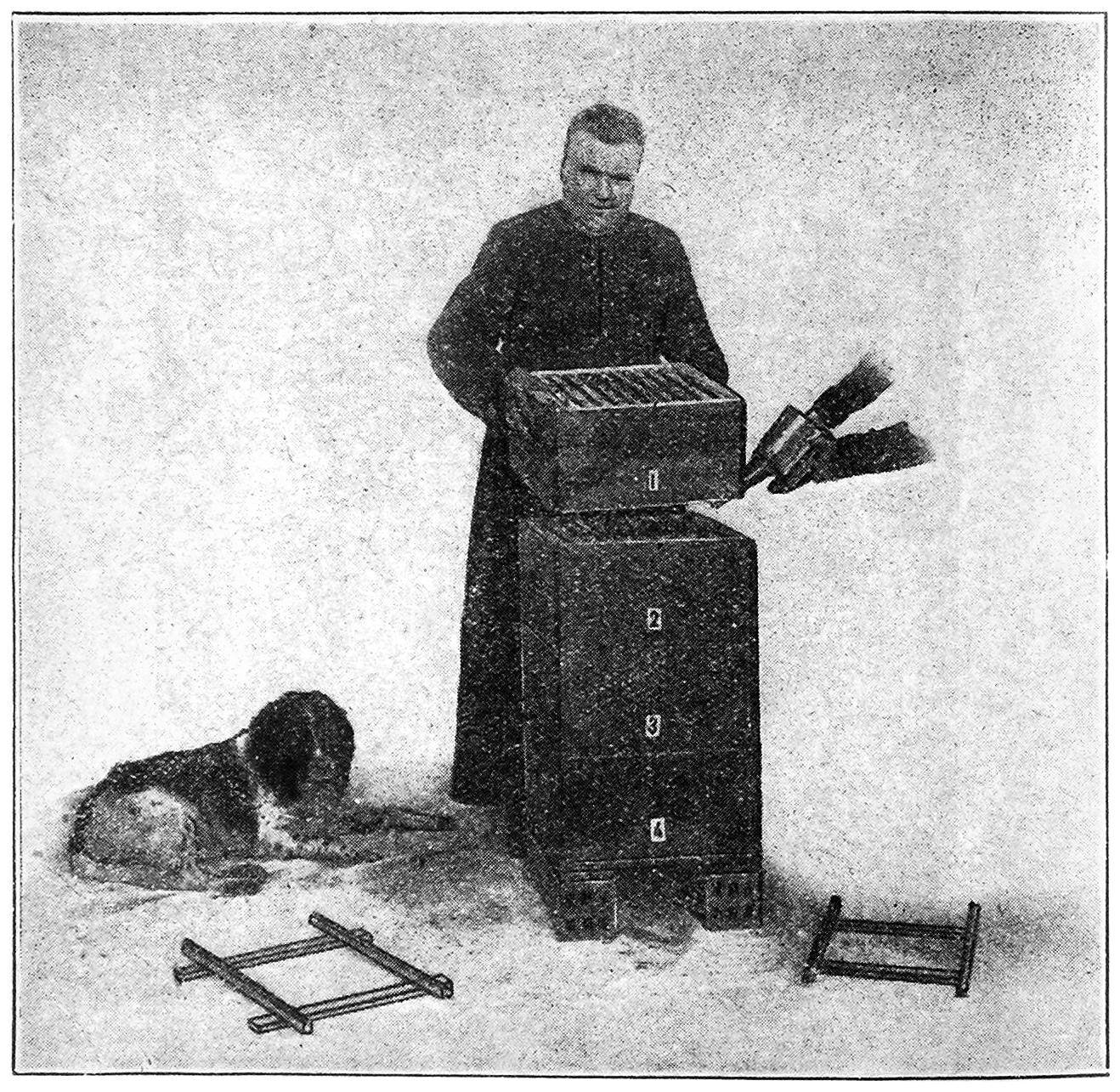
- Born: Éloi François Émile Warré; May 9, 1867; Grébault-Mesnil
- Died: April 20, 1951 (aged 83); Tours
- Known for: Inventor of the Warré Hive (People’s Hive)
- Notable work: L’apiculture pour tous Le Secret de la santé, manuel des malades, des bien-portants et des gardes-malades

Émile Warré (9 May 1867 – 20 April 1951) was a French priest and beekeeper who published several books and invented the Warré Hive, also known as the People’s Hive.

== Biography ==
Éloi François Émile Warré was born on 9 May 1867, in Grébault-Mesnil and died on 20 April 1951, in Tours. He was ordained as a priest on 19 September 1891, in the Diocese of Amiens and became a parish priest in Mérélessart, Somme in 1897 and then in Martainneville, Somme in 1904.

== Publications ==
He published several books based on his research:

- La santé ou les Meilleurs traitements de toutes les maladies
- Le Miel, ses propriétés et ses usages
- L’apiculture pour tous
- Le Secret de la santé, manuel des malades, des bien-portants et des gardes-malades

== Warré hive ==
He is best known as the inventor of the People’s Hive (French: la ruche populaire). By 1948, Warré had been practicing beekeeping for over thirty years and had 350 hives in his apiary with a variety of models which he compared for over 15 years. After extensive research, he designed the People’s Hive. The goal was to create a hive that was as close to the natural conditions for the bees while remaining practical for the beekeeper. It was also designed to be built economically by anyone with simple tools and his book.

== Links ==
Italian Website on Warré Beehives
