= William Broughton =

William Broughton may refer to:

- William Robert Broughton (1762–1821), British naval officer who explored parts of the Pacific Ocean
- William Broughton (magistrate) (1768–1821), early settler and magistrate in New South Wales
- William Grant Broughton (1788–1853), first Anglican bishop of Australia
- Bill Broughton (William James Broughton, 1913–1990), New Zealand jockey

== See also ==
- William Broughton Davies (1831–1906), Sierra Leonean medical doctor
- William Broughton Carr (1836–1909), British author and beekeeper
