= Apidictor =

An apidictor is an instrument which measures and records the sound in a beehive. The instrument records the aggregate sound made by the buzzing of the bees' wings, and may help with predicting when a colony is preparing to swarm.

Edward Farrington Woods, a BBC sound engineer, invented and patented the apidictor in 1952, and sold 300 worldwide.
