= Grilled honeycomb =

Southeast Asian street food

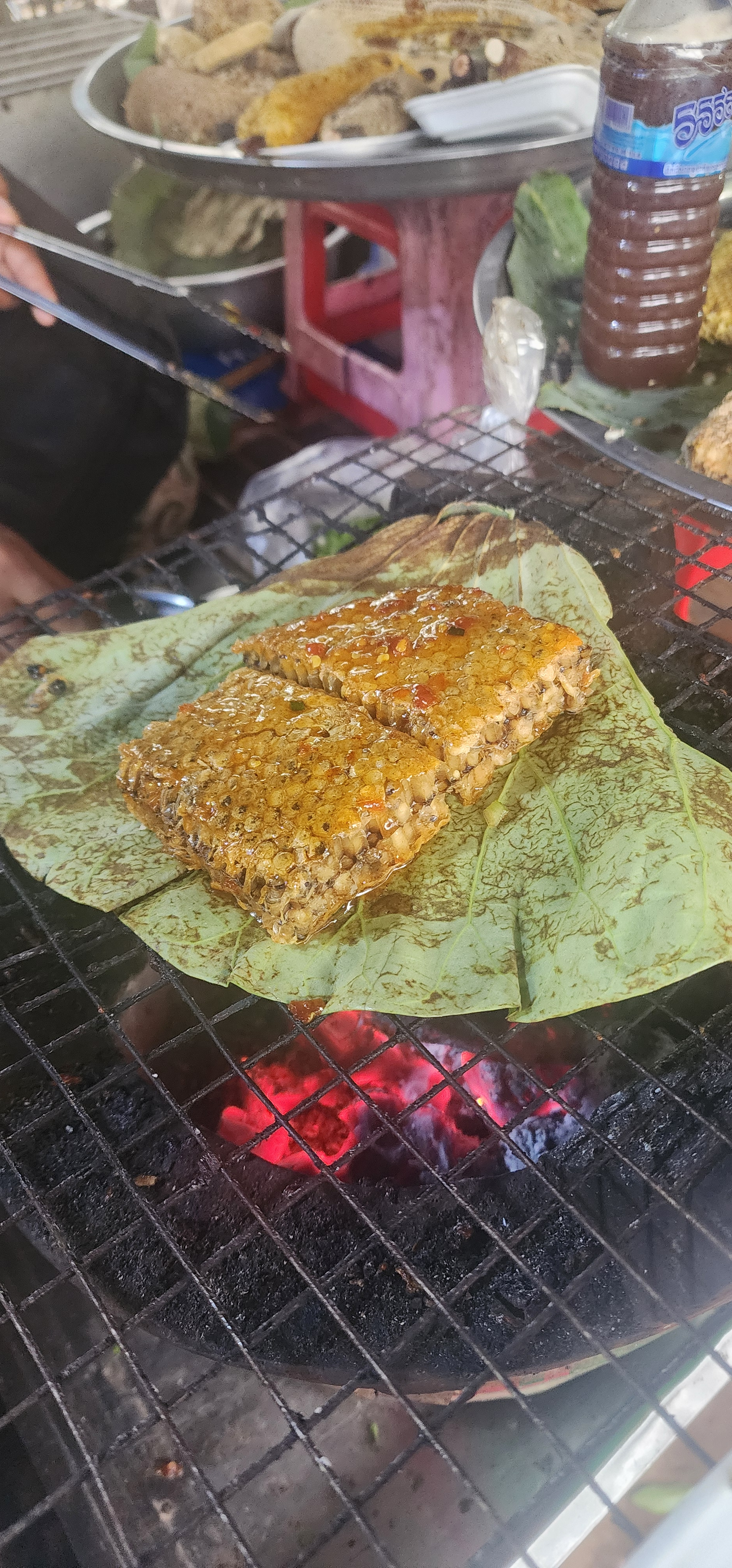
- Type: Street food
- Course: Appetizer
- Region or state: Southeast Asia
- Associated cuisine: Cambodian, Lao and Northern Thai cuisine
- Serving temperature: Grilled
- Main ingredients: Honeycomb, salt, chili, spring onions

Grilled honeycomb (Khmer: កូនឃ្មុំត្រួយរាំងបែបខ្មែរ, kun khmom lit. 'baby bees' or ឃ្មុំអាំង, khmom ăng lit. 'grilled honey'; Lao: maeng pherng; Northern Thai: แอ๊บผึ้ง, RTGS: Aep phueng; Thai: รังผึ้งย่าง, RTGS: Rang phueng yang) is grilled bee honeycomb with bee larvae. It is considered a street food delicacy in Cambodia, Laos and Northern Thailand.

== Preparation ==
Honeycomb are harvested from the forest during rain season and they are seasoned with salt, chili, and spring onions, before being grilled. Wrapped in a waxy green banana leaf with char around the edges, the honeycomb is shaped like a corncob and is served fresh off the grill with its white bee larvae, still housed in the honeycomb hexagons. The bee larvae are voluntarily kept within the honeycomb during the preparation as in some Asian countries, honey bee worker or drone pupae (in their white stage) are consumed by humans after pickling or boiling.

== Taste ==
When cooked or dried, honeycombs tend to retain their shape and are agreeably crunchy, presenting an intense nutty flavour. Described by one chef as tasting like “fatty honey,” the larvae survive on beebread, “the slightly fermented pollen stores of the hive,” lending to their subtly sweet flavor. It is not a cheap street food but an expensive delicacy.

It is a very weird taste still, but it subtly mixes sweet and savory together and creates something truly unique [to] taste.

== Nutrition ==
Bee larvae packs a particularly strong punch of protein. Research into the nutritional value of honey bee brood indicates that it is high in carbohydrates and protein, contains all the essential amino acids. Brood is a good source of phosphorus, magnesium, potassium and the trace minerals iron, zinc, copper, selenium and most of the B-vitamins, as well as vitamin C and choline.
