= Beehive =

Structure housing a honey bee colony

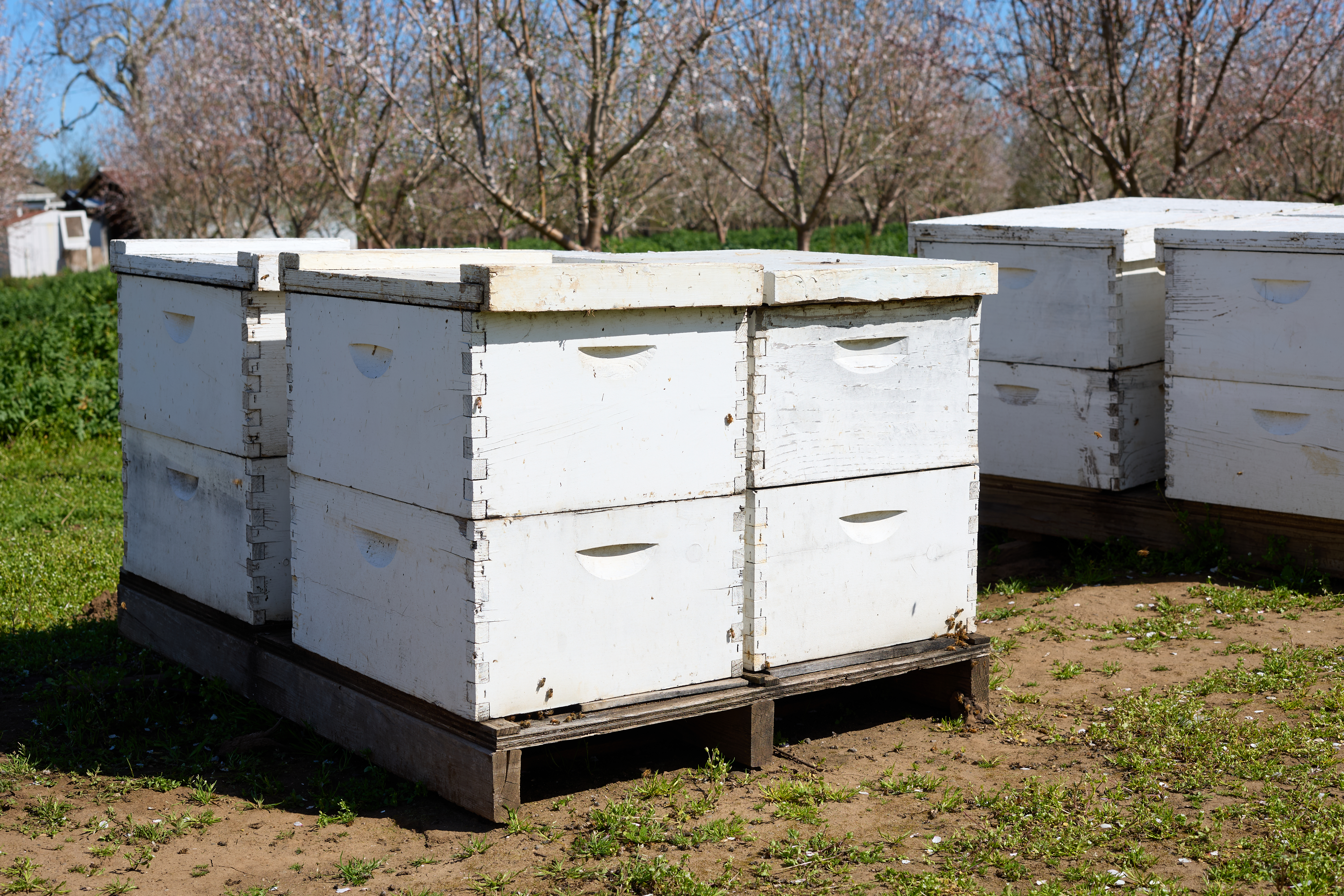
Wooden beehives with active honey bees in a California almond orchard

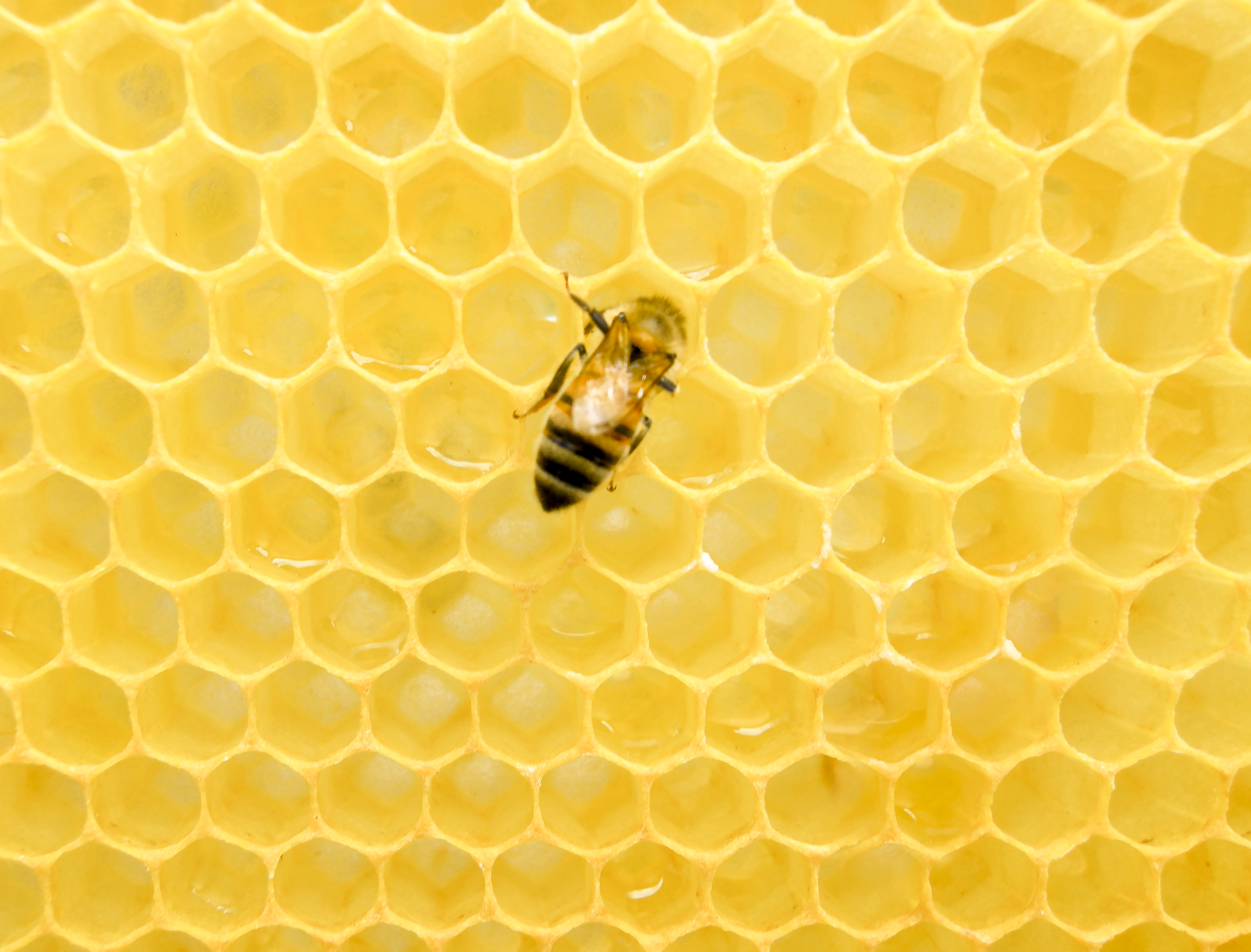
A honeycomb created inside a wooden beehive

A beehive is an enclosed structure in which honey bees raise their young and produce honey as part of their seasonal cycle. Although the word beehive is used to describe the nest of any bee colony, scientific and professional literature distinguishes nest from hive. Nest is used to discuss colonies that house themselves in natural or artificial cavities or in structures that are hanging and exposed. The term hive is used to describe a man made structure created to house a honey bee colony. While species of Apis live in colonies, the western (Apis mellifera) and eastern honey bees (Apis cerana) are the main species kept in artificial beehives.

The hive's internal structure is a densely packed group of hexagonal prismatic cells made of beeswax, called a honeycomb. The bees use the cells to store food (honey and pollen) and to house the brood (eggs, larvae, and pupae).

Beehives are used by humans for producing honey, ensuring pollination of crops, housing bees for apitherapy treatment, and mitigating the effects of colony collapse disorder. In North America, hives are commonly transported between farms so bees can pollinate various crops during their specific blooming periods.

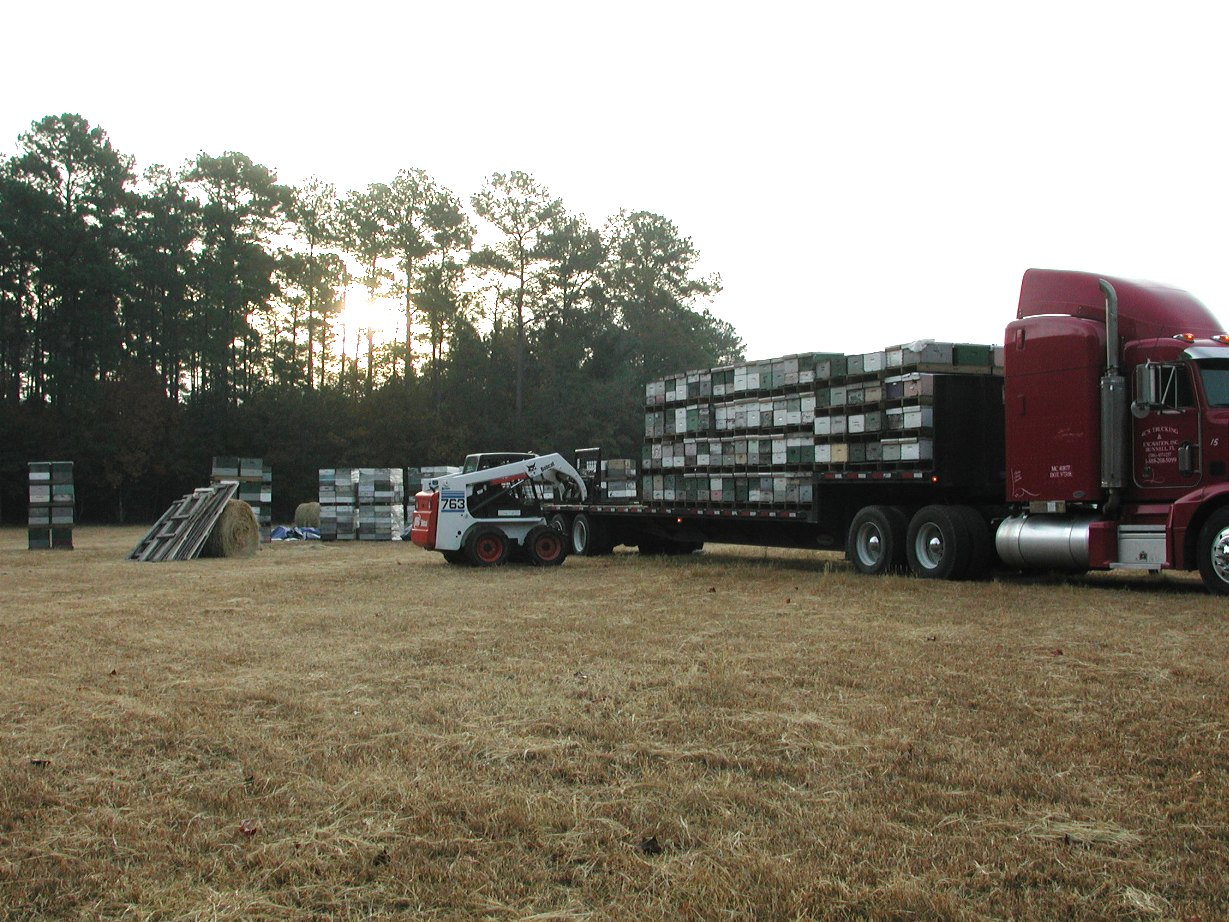
Beehives being transported for pollination on farms.

Several patents have been issued for beehive designs.

== Honey bee nests ==
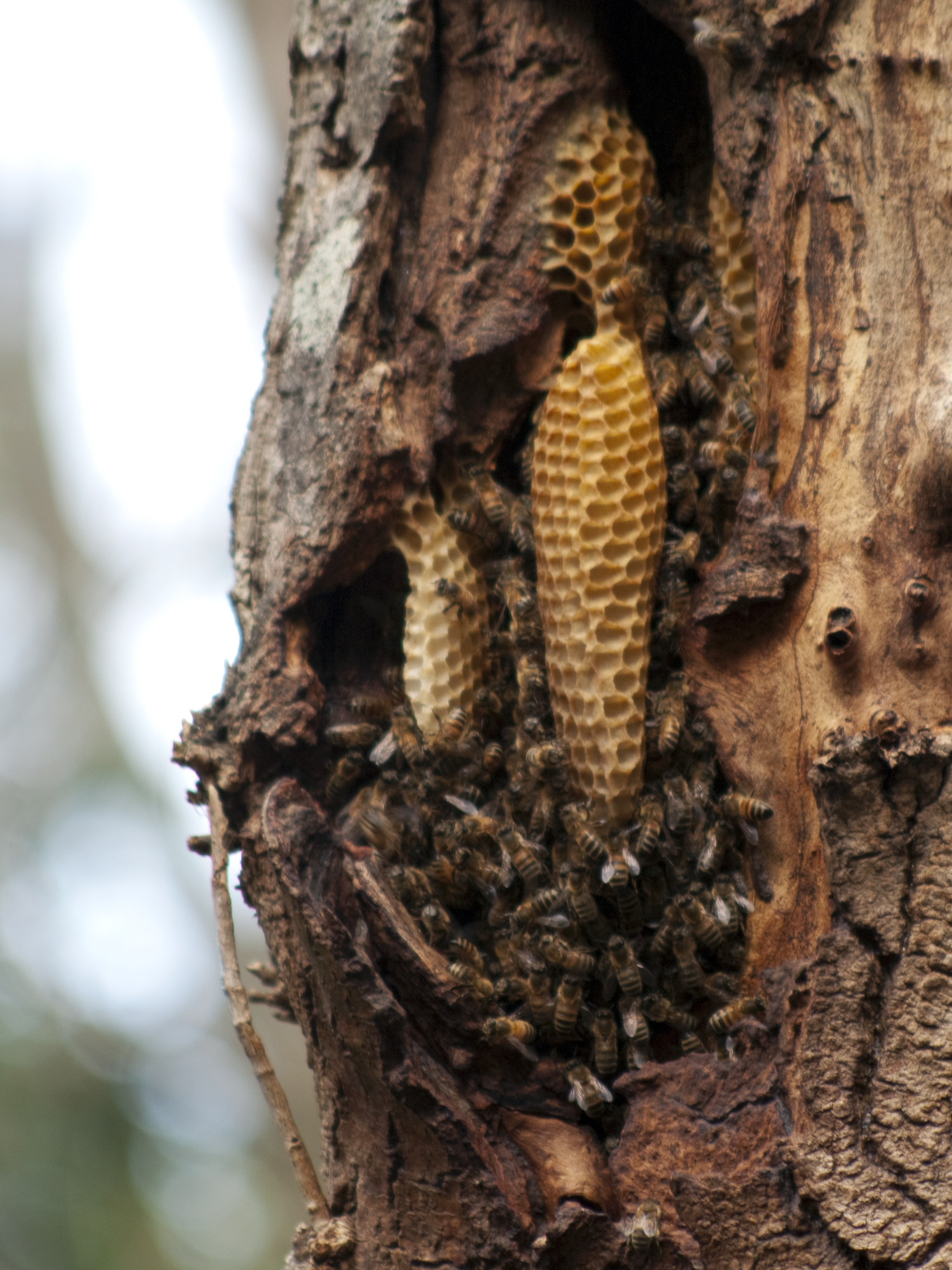
Natural bee colony in the hollow of a tree

Honey bees use caves, rock cavities, and hollow trees as natural nesting sites. In warmer climates, they may build exposed hanging nests; members of other subgenera have exposed aerial combs. Multiple parallel honeycombs form the nest with a relatively uniform bee space. Nests typically have a single entrance. Western honey bees prefer nest cavities approximately 45 L (1.6 cu ft) in volume and avoid those smaller than 10 L (0.35 cu ft) or larger than 100 L (3.5 cu ft). Western honey bees show several nest-site preferences: the height above ground is usually between 1 metre (3.3 ft) and 5 metres (16 ft), entrance positions tend to face downward, equatorial-facing entrances are favored, and nest sites over 300 metres (980 ft) from the parent colony are preferred. Most bees occupy nests for several years.

The bees often smooth the bark surrounding the nest entrance and coat the cavity walls with a thin layer of hardened plant resin called propolis. Honeycombs are attached to the walls along the cavity tops and sides, but the bees leave passageways along the comb edges. The standard nest architecture for all honeybees is similar: honey is stored in the upper part of the comb; beneath it are rows of pollen-storage cells, worker-brood cells, and drone-brood cells, in that order. The peanut-shaped queen cells are normally built at the lower edge of the comb.

== Ancient hives ==
In antiquity, Egyptians kept bees in manmade hives. The walls of the Egyptian sun temple of Nyuserre Ini from the 5th Dynasty, dated earlier than 2422 BC, depict workers blowing smoke into hives as they remove honeycombs. Inscriptions detailing honey production are found on the tomb of Pabasa from the 26th Dynasty (c. 650 BCE), and describe honey stored in jars and cylindrical hives.

The archaeologist Amihai Mazar cites 30 intact hives that were discovered in the ruins of Tel Rehov, located in modern-day Israel. This is evidence that an advanced honey industry existed in Canaan approximately 4,000 years ago. The 150 beehives, many broken, were made of straw and unbaked clay. They were found in orderly rows. Ezra Marcus from the University of Haifa said the discovery provided a glimpse of ancient beekeeping seen in texts and ancient art from the Near East. An altar decorated with fertility figurines was found alongside the hives and may indicate religious practices associated with beekeeping. While beekeeping predates these ruins, this is the oldest apiary yet discovered.

== Traditional hives ==
Traditional beehives provided an enclosure for the bee colony. Because no internal structures were provided for the bees, they created their honeycomb within the hives. The comb is often cross-attached and cannot be moved without destroying it. This is sometimes called a fixed-frame hive to differentiate it from the modern movable-frame hives. Hives were often destroyed during harvesting, though some variations used top baskets which could be removed when the bees filled them with honey. These were gradually supplanted with box hives of varying dimensions, with or without frames, and finally replaced by newer modern equipment.

Honey from traditional hives was extracted by pressing – crushing the wax honeycomb to squeeze out the contents. Due to this harvesting, traditional beehives provided more beeswax, but far less honey than a modern hive.

Four styles of traditional beehives are mud hives, clay/tile hives, skeps, and bee gums.

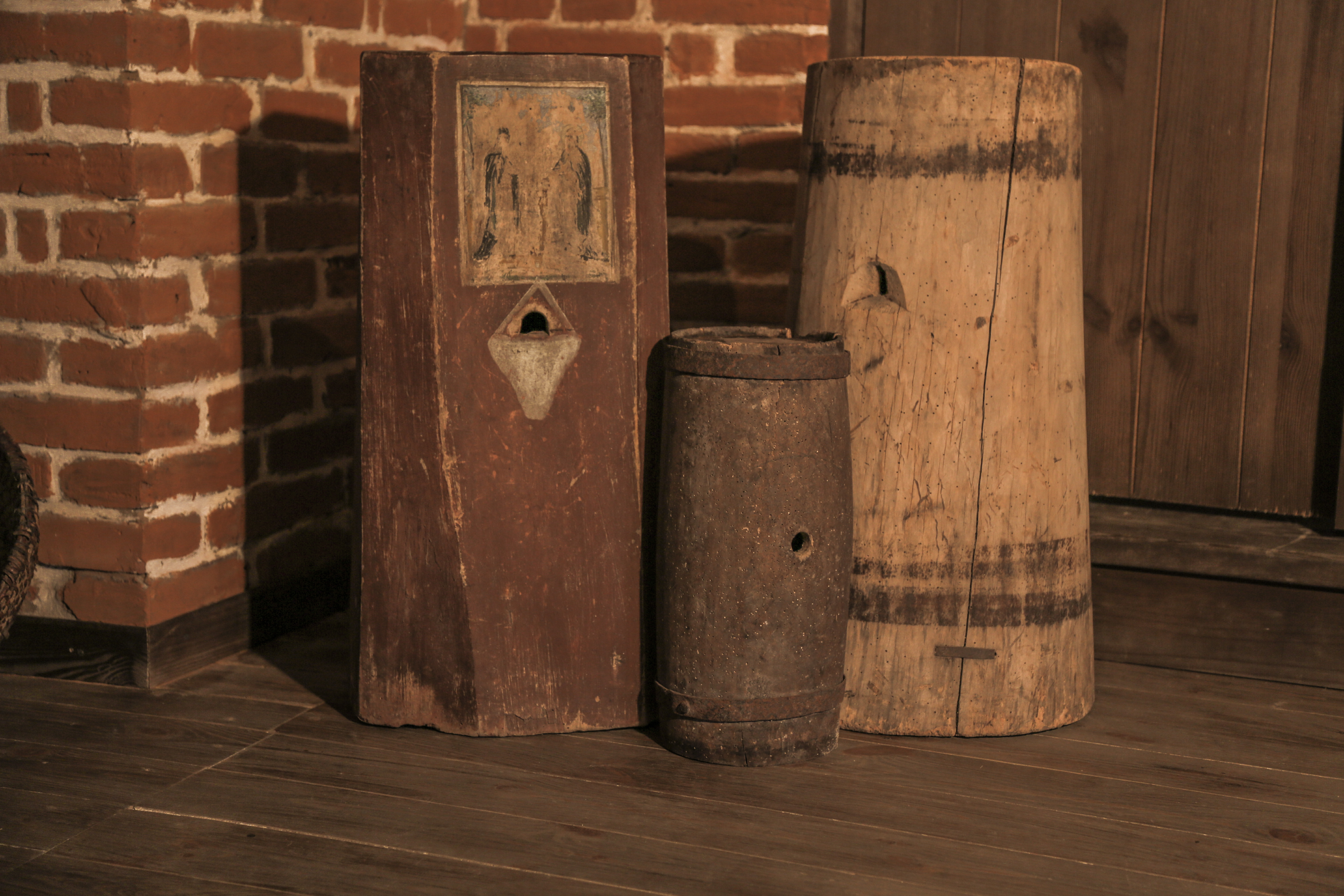
Hives from the collection of Radomysl Castle, Ukraine, 19th century

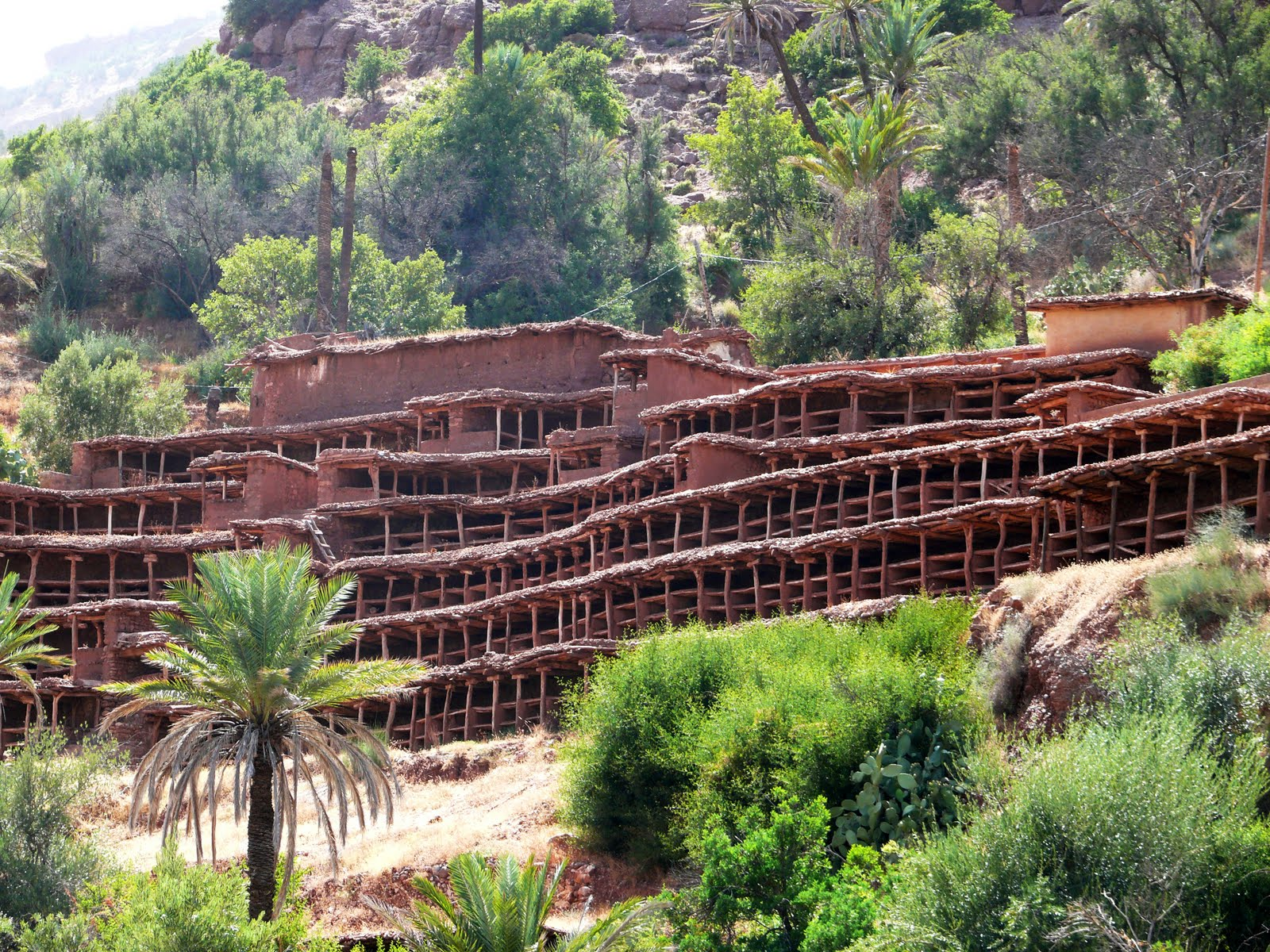
Racks for cylindrical clay hives at the Inzerki apiary, Morocco

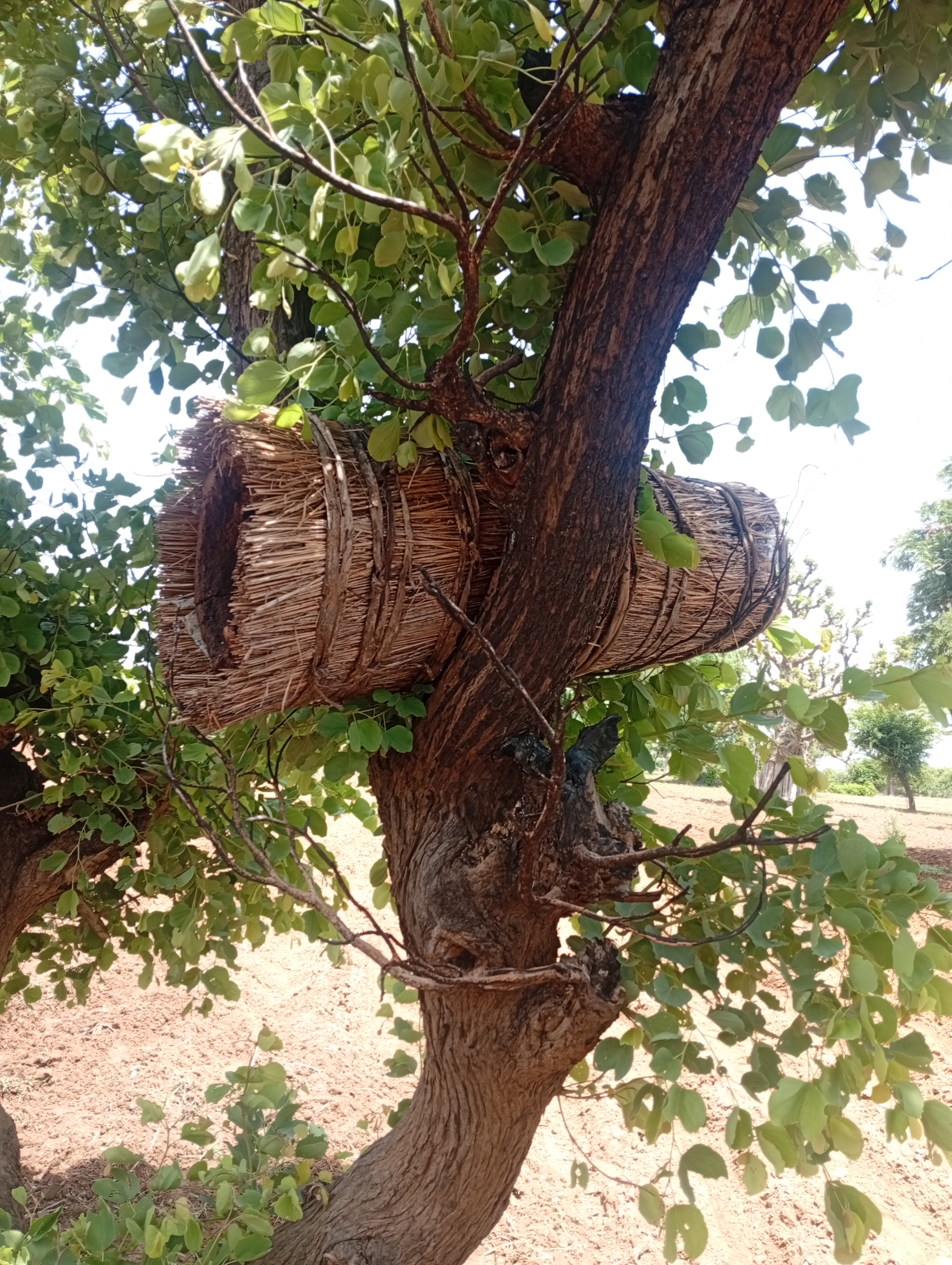
Traditional beehive, commonly found in Northern Nigeria, ingeniously crafted from thatch, specifically dried grasses.

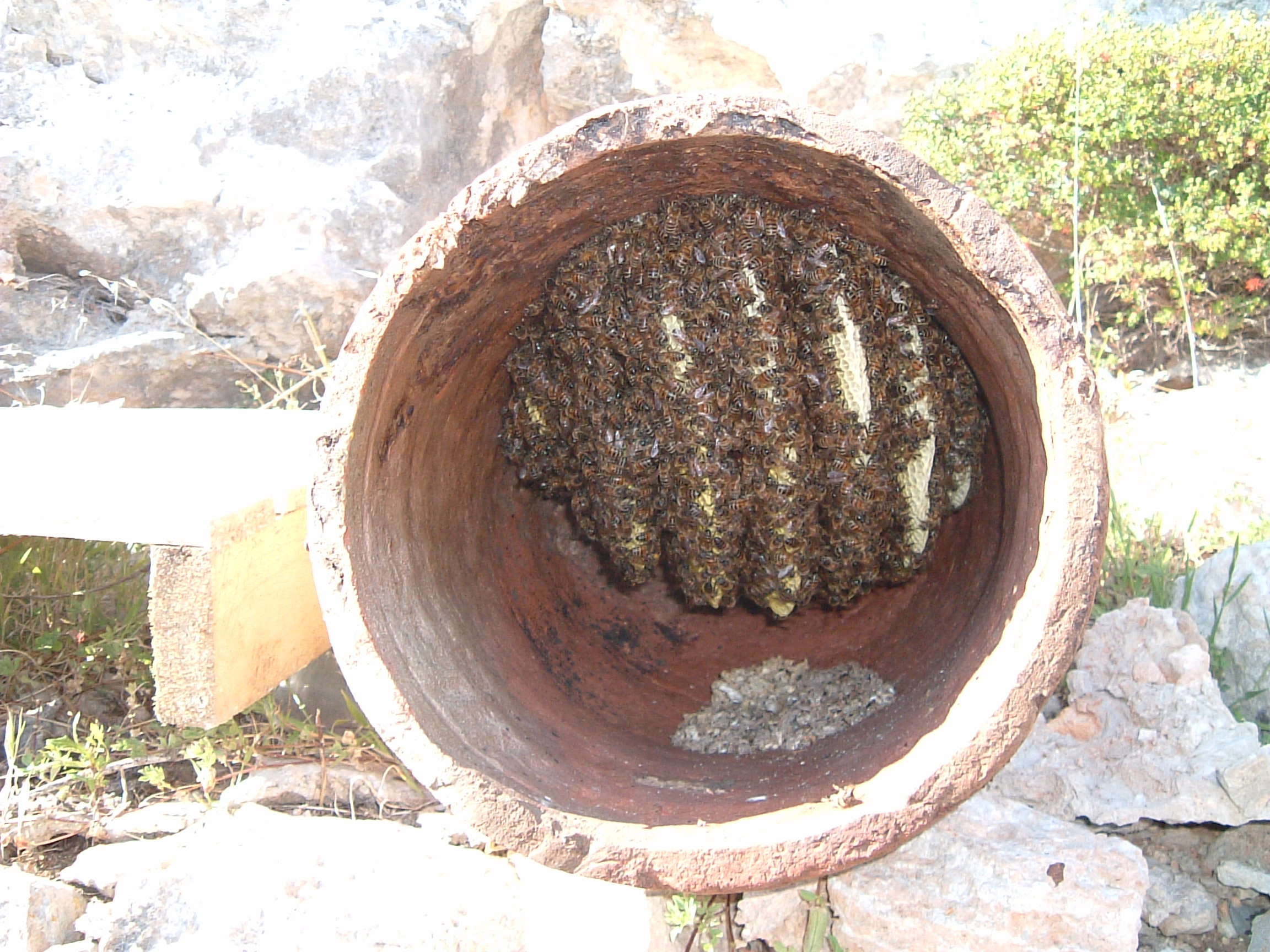
Bees in a baked clay jar in Malta

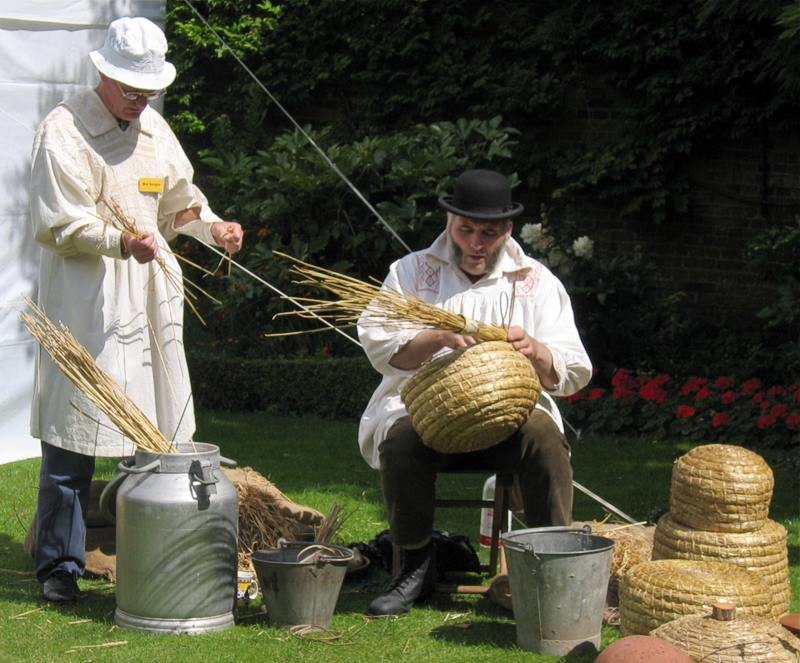
Traditional manufacture of skeps from straw in England

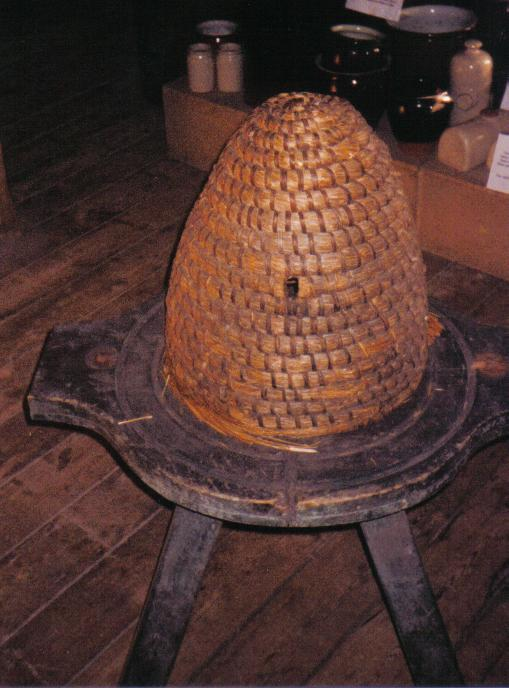
A bee skep at Dalgarven Mill. The base is part of an old cheese press.

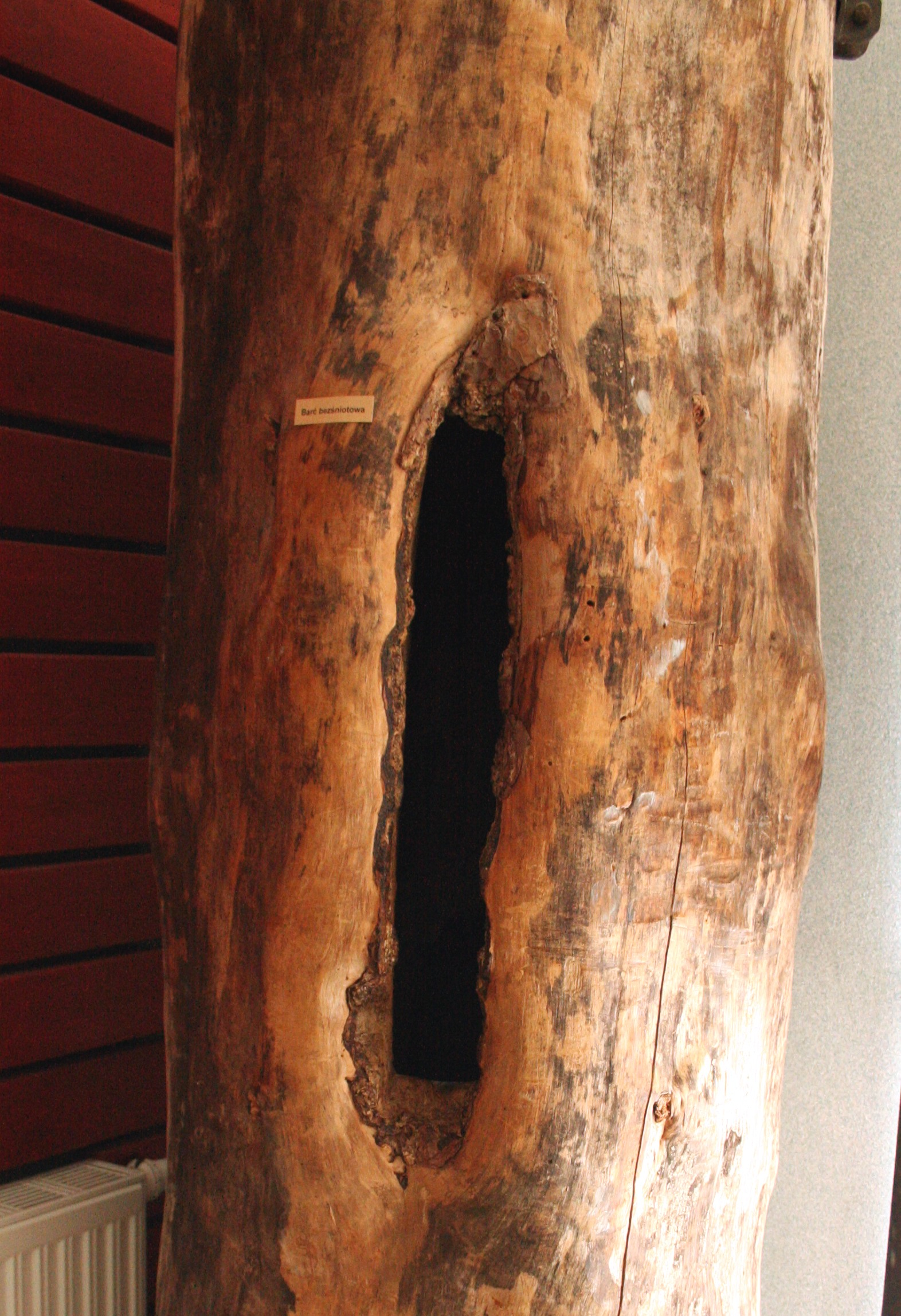
"Barć" in a museum in Białowieża

=== Mud hives ===
Mud hives are still used in Egypt and Siberia. These are long cylinders made from a mixture of unbaked mud, straw, and dung.

=== Clay hives ===
Clay tiles were the customary homes of kept bees in the eastern end of the Mediterranean. Long cylinders of baked clay were used in ancient Egypt, the Middle East, and to some extent in Greece, Italy, and Malta.

Some setups involved a singular hive, but it was more common for them to be stacked in rows to provide partial shade. Keepers would smoke one end to drive the bees to the other end while they harvested honey.

=== Skeps ===
Skeps, baskets placed open-end-down, have been used to house bees for some 2000 years. Believed to have been first used in Ireland, they were initially made from wicker plastered with mud and dung but after the Middle Ages, almost all were made of straw. In northern and western Europe, skeps were made of coils of grass or straw. In its simplest form, there is a single entrance at the bottom of the skep. Like other traditional hives, skeps have no internal structure provided for the bees, meaning the colony must produce its own honeycomb for structure & stability. The size of early modern skeps was about two pecks to a bushel (18 to 36 liters).

Skeps have two major flaws: beekeepers cannot inspect the comb for diseases and pests, and honey removal is difficult and often results in the destruction of the entire colony. To get the honey, beekeepers either drove the bees out of the skep or, by using a bottom extension called an eke or a top extension called a cap, sought to create a comb with only honey in it. Quite often the bees were killed, sometimes using lighted sulfur, to allow the honeycomb to be removed. Skeps could also be squeezed in a vise to extract the honey.

Later skep designs included a smaller woven basket (cap) on top over a small hole in the main skep. This cap acted as a crude super, allowing some honey to be extracted with less destruction of brood and bees. In England, such an extension piece consisting of a ring of about 4 or 5 coils of straw placed below a straw beehive to give extra room for brood rearing was called an eke, imp, or nadir. An eke was used to give just a bit of extra room, or to "eke" some more space, a nadir is a larger extension used when a full story was needed beneath.

The term is derived from Old Norse skeppa, "basket". A person who made such woven beehives was called a "skepper", a surname that still exists in Western countries. In England, the thickness of the coil of straw was controlled using a ring of leather or a piece of cow's horn called a "girth" and the coils of straw could be sewn together using strips of briar. Likenesses of skeps can be found in paintings, carvings, and old manuscripts. The skep is often used on signs as an indication of industry ("the busy bee").

In the late 18th century, more complex skeps appeared; featuring wooden tops with holes, over which glass jars were placed. The comb would then be built into the glass jars, making the designs commercially attractive.

As of 1998, most US states prohibited the use of skeps, or any other hive that cannot be inspected for disease and parasites.

Sometimes in the British Isles and some parts of France a skep would be placed in a bee bole, a cavity or alcove in a wall.

=== Bee gums ===
In the eastern United States, especially in the Southeast, sections of hollow trees were used until the 20th century. These were called "gums" because they often were from black gum (Nyssa sylvatica) trees.

Sections of the hollow trees were set upright in "bee yards" or apiaries. Sometimes sticks or crossed sticks were placed under a board cover to give an attachment for the honeycomb. As with skeps, the harvest of honey from these often destroyed the colony (Not if set up as a topbar). Often, the harvester would kill the bees before even opening their nest. This was done by inserting a metal container of burning sulfur into the gum.

Natural tree hollows and artificially hollowed tree trunks were widely used in the past by beekeepers in Central Europe. For example, in Poland, such a beehive was called a barć and was protected in various ways from unfavorable weather conditions (rain, frost) and predators (woodpeckers, bears, pine martens, forest dormice). Harvest of honey from hollow trees did not destroy the colony, as only a protective piece of wood was removed from the opening and smoke was used to pacify the bees for a short time. Spain still uses cork bark cylinder with cork top hives, similar to a gum or barć, aka colmenas de corcho.

Part of the reason why bee gums are still used is that this allows the producers of the honey to distinguish themselves from other honey producers and to ask for a higher price for the honey. An example where bee gums are still used is Mont-Lozère, France, although in Europe they are referred to as log hives. The length of these log hives used is shorter than bee gums; they are hollowed out artificially and cut to a specific size.

=== Other kinds ===
In New Zealand, native Māori beekeepers, after the arrival of Europeans and their non-native honey bees, applied their skills of weaving baskets (kete) further into making hives of similar structure made from straw.

== Modern hives ==
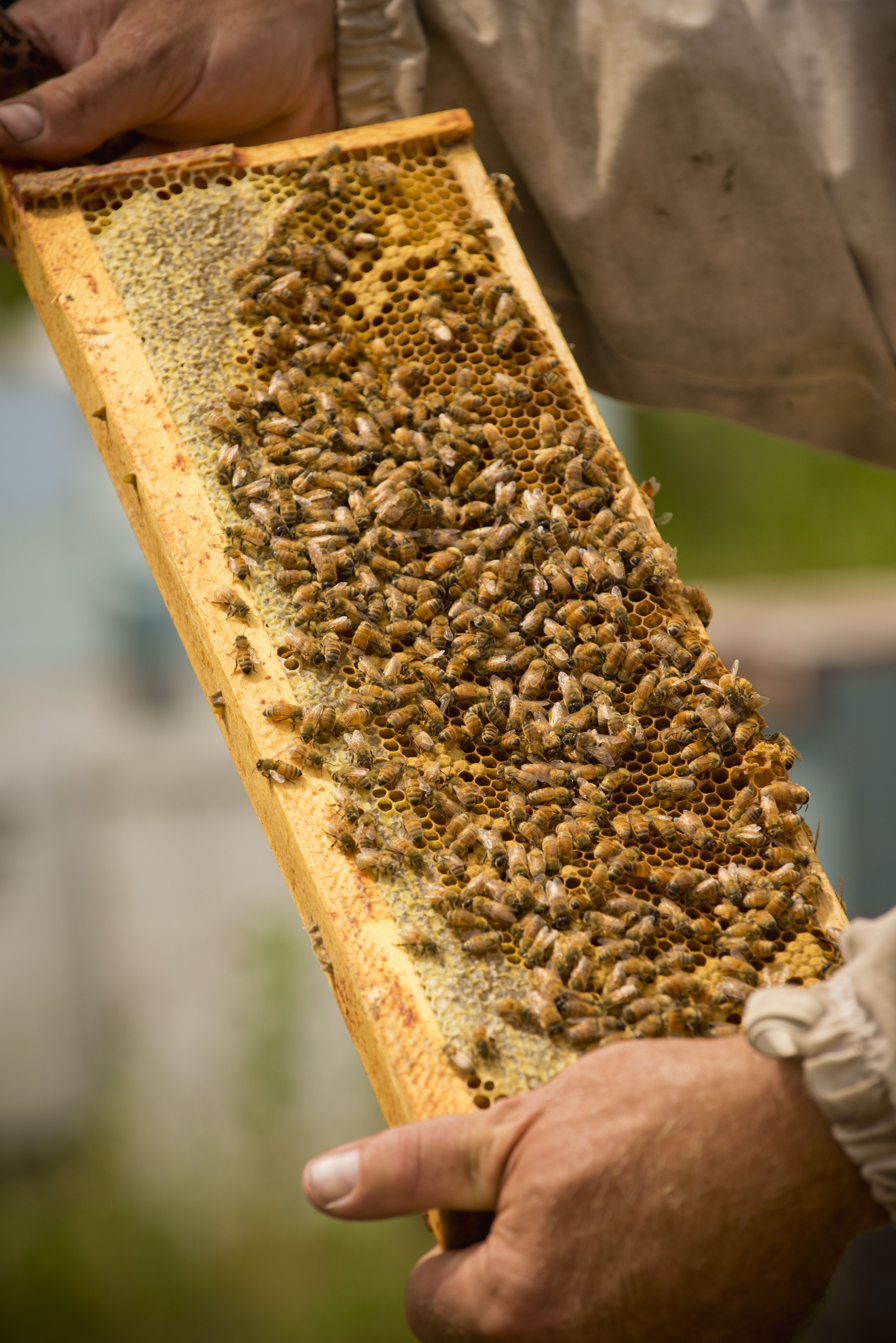
A beekeeper inspects a hive frame with a honeycomb showing capped honey and brood cells. The modular design allows for easier management and non-destructive harvesting of honey and beeswax.

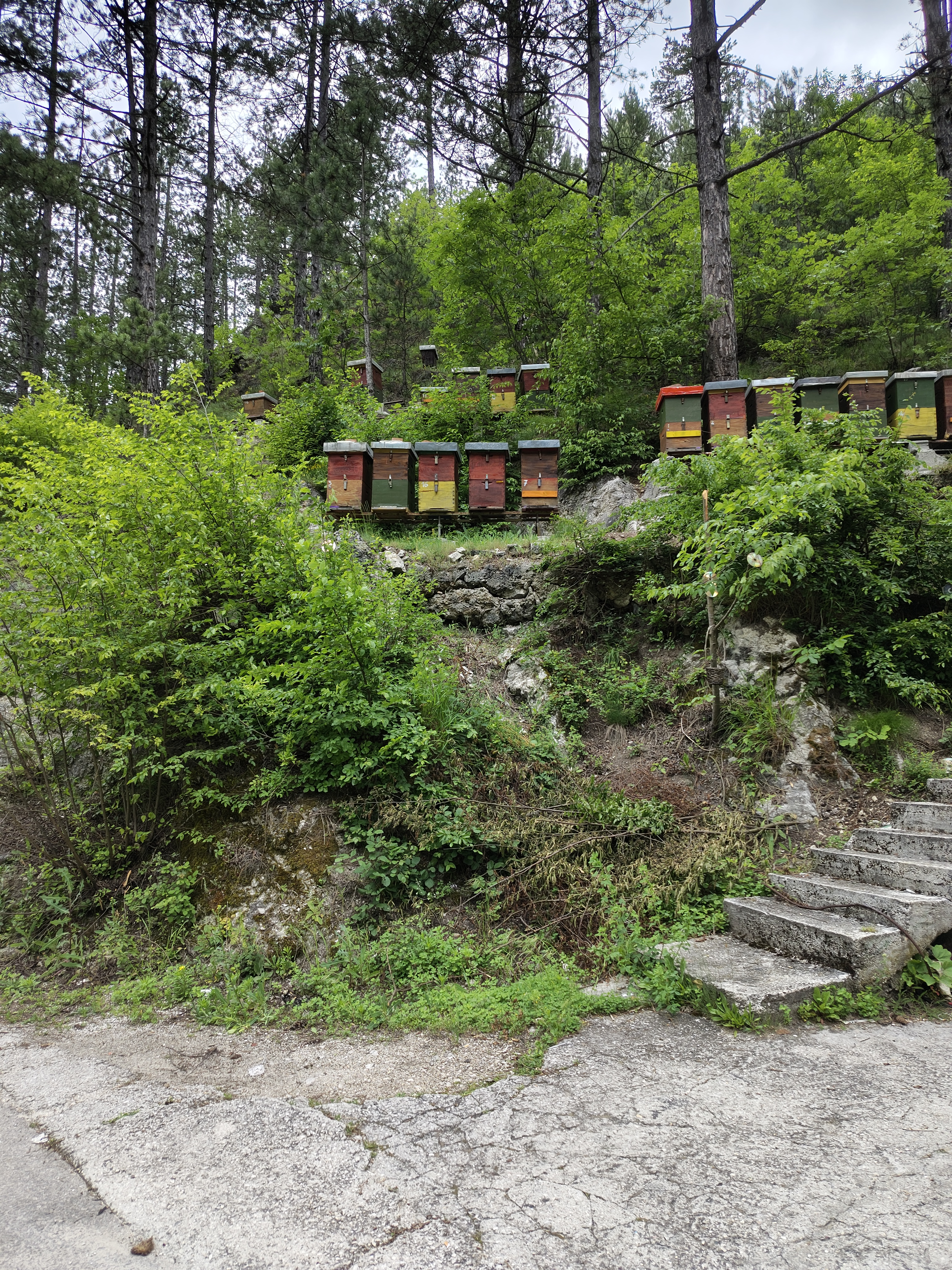
Beehives in the mountains of Bosnia

The earliest recognizably modern designs of beehives arose in the 19th century, though they were perfected from intermediate stages of progress made in the 18th century.

Intermediate stages in hive design were recorded for example by Thomas Wildman in 1768-1770, who described advances over the destructive old skep-based beekeeping so that the bees no longer had to be killed to harvest the honey. Wildman, for example, fixed a parallel array of wooden bars across the top of a straw hive or skep (with a separate straw top to be fixed on later) "so that there are in all seven bars of deal" [in a 10-inch-diameter (250 mm) hive] "to which the bees fix their combs". He also described using such hives in a multi-story configuration, foreshadowing the modern use of supers: he described adding (at the proper time) successive straw hives below, and eventually removing the ones above when free of brood and filled with honey so that the bees could be separately preserved at the harvest for the following season. Wildman also described a further development, using hives with "sliding frames" for the bees to build their comb, foreshadowing more modern uses of movable-comb hives. Wildman acknowledged the advances in knowledge of bees previously made by Swammerdam, Maraldi, and de Reaumur – he included a lengthy translation of Reaumur's account of the natural history of bees – and he also described the initiatives of others in designing hives for the preservation of bee-life when taking the harvest, citing in particular reports from Brittany dating from the 1750s, due to Comte de la Bourdonnaye.

In 1814 Petro Prokopovych, the founder of commercial beekeeping in Ukraine, invented one of the first beehive frames which allowed an easier honey harvest.

The correct distance between combs for easy operations in beehives was described in 1845 by Jan Dzierżon as 1.5 inches (38 mm) from the center of one top bar to the center of the next one. In 1848, Dzierżon introduced grooves into the hive's side walls replacing the strips of wood for moving top bars. The grooves were 8 mm × 8 mm (0.31 in × 0.31 in), the spacing later termed bee space. Based on the aforementioned measurements, August Adolph von Berlepsch (Bienezeitung May 1852) in Thuringia and L.L. Langstroth (October 1852) in the United States designed their own movable-frame hives. Langstroth used, however "about 1/2 inch" (13 mm) above the frame's top bars and "about 3/8 inch" (9.5 mm) between the frames and hive body.

Hives can be vertical or horizontal. There are three main types of modern hive in common use worldwide:

- the Langstroth hive
- the top-bar hive
- the Warre hive

Most hives have been optimized for Apis mellifera and Apis cerana. Some other hives have been designed and optimized for some meliponines such as Melipona beecheii. Examples of such hives are the Nogueira-Neto hive and the UTOB hive.

=== Vertical hives ===
==== Langstroth hives ====
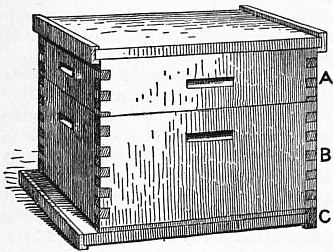
Langstroth hive

Langstroth hives are named for Rev. Lorenzo Langstroth, who patented his design in the United States on October 5, 1852. It was based on the ideas of Johann Dzierzon and other leaders in apiculture. It combines a top-worked hive with hanging frames and the use of bee spaces between frames and other parts. Variants of his design have become the standard style of hive for many of the world's beekeepers, both professional and amateur. Langstroth hive bodies are rectangular and can be stacked to expand the usable space for the bees. They can be made from a variety of materials, but commonly of timber. The modern Langstroth hive consists of:

- Bottom board: this has an entrance for the bees.
- Boxes containing frames for brood and honey: the lowest box for the queen to lay eggs, and boxes above where honey is stored
- Inner cover and top cap providing weather protection

Inside the boxes, frames are hung parallel to each other. Langstroth frames are thin rectangular structures made of wood or plastic and typically have a plastic or wax foundation on which the bees draw out the comb. The frames hold the honeycomb formed by the bees with beeswax. Eight or ten frames side by side (depending on the size of the box) will fill the hive body and leave the right amount of bee space between each frame and between the end frames and the hive body. With appropriate provision of bee space, the bees are not likely to glue parts together with propolis nor fill spaces with burr comb – although the dimensions now usual for top bee space are not the same as those that Langstroth described. Self-spacing beehive frames were introduced by Julius Hoffman, a student of Johann Dzierzon. Langstroth frames can be reinforced with wire, making it possible to spin the honey out of the comb in a centrifuge. As a result, the empty frames and comb can be returned to the beehive for re-filling by the bees. Creating a honeycomb involves a significant energy investment, conservatively estimated at 6.25 kilograms (13.8 lb) of honey needed to create 1 kilogram (2.2 lb) of comb in temperate climates. Reusing comb can thus increase the productivity of a beekeeping enterprise.

The sizes of hive bodies (rectangular boxes without tops or bottoms placed one on top of another) and of internal frames vary between named styles. A variety of approximations to Langstroth's original box and frame sizes are still used, with top bars some 19 in (480 mm) long or a little more. However, this class of hives includes several other styles, mostly used in Europe, which differ mainly in the size and number of frames used. These include:

- BS National Beehive: This smaller version of the Langstroth class of hive is designed for the less prolific and more docile Buckfastleigh bee strain, and for standard dimension parts. It is based on square boxes (18 1/8 in or 460 mm side), with a 8 7/8 in (230 mm) standard/brood box and shallow, 5 7/8 in (150 mm) Supers typically used for honey. The construction of the boxes is relatively complicated (eight pieces), but strong and with easy-to-hold handles. The boxes take frames of 17 in (430 mm) in length, with a relatively long lug (1 1/2 in or 38 mm) and a comb width of 14 in (360 mm).
  - BS Commercial hive: A variation with the same cross-sectional dimensions as a BS National hive (18 in x 18 in, 460 mm x 460 mm), but deeper brood box (10 1/2 in or 270 mm) and supers intended for more prolific bees. The internal structure of the boxes is also simpler, resulting in wider frames (16 in or 410 mm) with shorter handles or lugs. Some find these supers too heavy when full of honey and therefore use National supers on top of a Commercial brood box.
  - Rose Hive: A hive and method of management developed by Tim Rowe, it is a variation on the BS National hive. The Rose hive maintains the same cross-sectional dimensions as the National hive (18 in x 18 in, 460 mm x 460 mm), but opts for a single depth box of 7 1/2 in (190 mm). The single box and frame size are used for both brood and honey supers. Standardizing on one size reduces complexity and allows for the movement of brood or honey frames to any other position in the hive. A queen excluder is avoided, allowing the queen freedom to move where she wants. Boxes are added to the hive above the brood and below the supers. The colony can expand during a large nectar flow and retract to lower portions of the hive as the colony shrinks in the fall. When collecting honey, brood and honey frames can be relocated up or down the hive, as needed.
  - Smith hive
- German Normal: German normal measure (DNM): mainly used in central and northern Germany. Of which Frankenbeute, Segeberger, and Spessartbeute are variants.
  - Zander: Developed by Enoch Zander, mainly used in southern Germany
- D.E. hive Designed by David Eyre
- Dadant hive: Developed by Charles Dadant (developed in the US in 1920 from the Dadant-Blatt hive)
  - B-BOX: Developed by the Italian company Beeing for urban locations and uses Dadant frames
- Hyper Hyve: Designed by Mike James and incorporates an insulated hive with integrated monitoring.

==== Warré hives ====
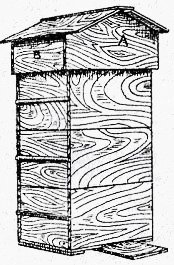
Warré Hive

The Warré hive was invented by the village priest Émile Warré, and is also called ruche populaire ('the people's hive'). It is a modular and storied design similar to a Langstroth hive. The hive body is made of boxes stacked vertically; however, it uses top bars for comb support instead of full frames similar to a Top-Bar Hive, as a general rule. The popularity of this hive is growing among 'sustainable-practice' beekeepers.

The Warre hive differs from other stacked hive systems in one fundamental aspect: when the bees need more space as the colony expands, the new box is "nadired"; i.e., positioned underneath the existing box or boxes. This serves the purpose of warmth retention within the brood nest of the hive, considered vital to colony health.

==== WBC hives ====
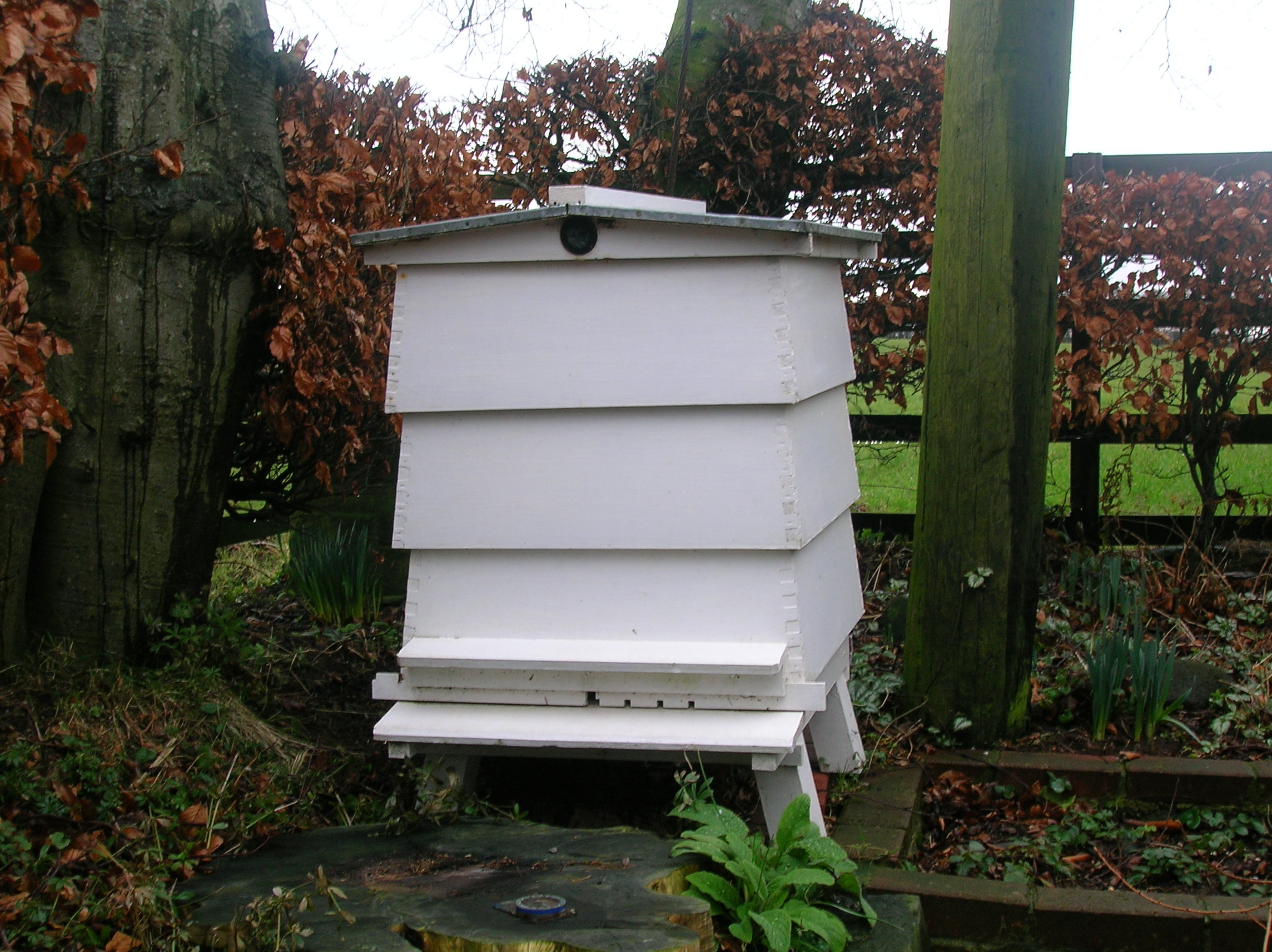
WBC hive

The WBC, invented by and named after William Broughton Carr in 1890, is a double-walled hive with an external housing that splays out towards the bottom of each frame covering a standard box shape hive inside. The WBC is in many respects the 'classic' hive as represented in pictures and paintings, but despite the extra level of insulation for the bees offered by its double-walled design, many beekeepers avoid it, owing to the inconvenience of having to remove the external layer before the hive can be examined.

==== CDB hives ====
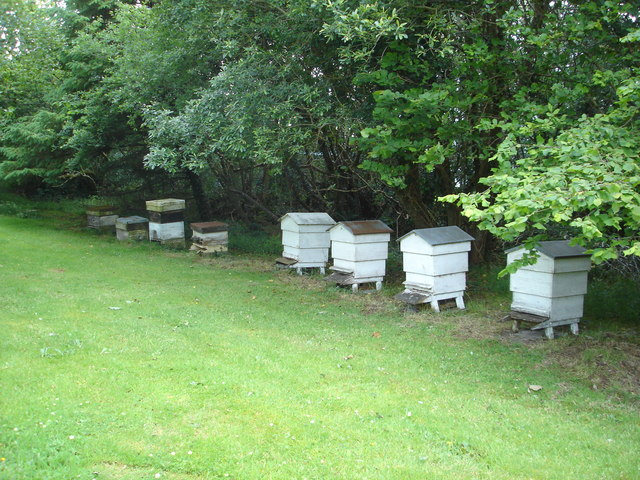
CDB hive

In 1890, Charles Nash Abbott (1830–1894), advisor to the Department of Agriculture and Technical Instruction for Ireland, designed a new Congested Districts Board (CDB) hive in Dublin, Ireland. It was commissioned by and named after the Congested Districts Board for Ireland which provided support for rural populations until its absorption into the Department of Agriculture.

==== AZ hives ====
One of the most famous Slovenian beekeepers was Anton Žnideršič (1874–1947). He developed the AZ hive house and hive box widely used today in Slovenia.

This is the method and hive style used in "Slovenian Beekeeping" and is regarded to be an excellent way to make temporary and mobile pollination possible for many seasonal crops (like almonds, a truck is used with an entire 'barn' of hives is parked adjacent to the fields needing pollination) and is also an excellent way to reduce manual labor for smaller apiaries and individuals keeping bees - The safety and security of a stationary and centralized hive, reduced frame weight and the ability to work inside are the most commonly referenced perks.

In 2022, UNESCO has added the cultural relevance and record of this style of beekeeping to their Representative List of the Intangible Cultural Heritage of Humanity.

=== Horizontal hives ===
These are single, long, boxes, with the bars hanging in parallel. The hive body of a common style of horizontal hive is often shaped like an inverted trapezoid, but it may be rectangular in cross-section and able to accept normal frames. They have movable combs and make use of the concept of bee space. They were developed as a lower-cost alternative to the standard Langstroth hives and equipment. They do not require the beekeeper to lift heavy supers when the hive is inspected or manipulated. They are popular in the US due to their alignment with the organic, treatment-free philosophies of many new beekeeping devotees in the United States. The initial costs and equipment requirements are typically much less than other hive designs. Scrap wood can often be used to build a good hive. Horizontal hives do not require the beekeeper to lift super boxes; all checks and manipulation can be done while lifting only one comb at a time and with minimal bending. In areas where large terrestrial animals such as honey badgers and bears present a threat to beehives, single-box hives may be suspended out of reach. Elsewhere, they are commonly raised to a level that allows the beekeeper to inspect and manipulate them in comfort.

Disadvantages include (usually) unsupported combs that cannot be spun in most honey extractors, and it is not usually possible to expand the hive if additional honey storage space is required. Most horizontal hives cannot easily be lifted and carried by one person.

==== Top-bar hives ====
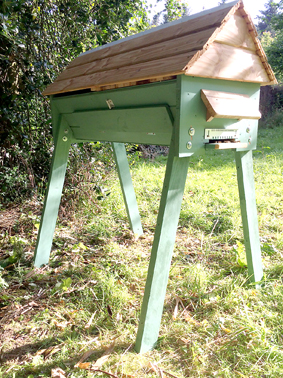
Top bar hive

Horizontal hives often use top-bars instead of frames. Top bars are simple lengths of timber often made by cutting scrap wood to size; it is not necessary to buy or assemble frames. The top bars form a continuous roof over the hive chamber, unlike conventional frames which offer a bee-space gap so that the bees can move up and down between hive boxes. The beekeeper does not usually provide foundation wax (or provides only a small starter piece of foundation) for the bees to build from. The bees build the comb so it hangs down from the top bar. This is in keeping with the way bees build wax in a natural cavity.

Because the unsupported comb built from a top bar cannot usually be centrifuged in a honey extractor, the honey is usually extracted by crushing and straining rather than centrifuging. Because the bees have to rebuild their comb after the honey is harvested, a top-bar hive yields a beeswax harvest in addition to honey. Queen excluders may or may not be used to keep the brood areas entirely separate from the honey. Even if no queen excluder is used, the bees store most of their honey separately from the areas where they are raising the brood, and honey can still be harvested without killing the bees or brood.

- Cathedral Hive: Modified top bar. The top bar is split into 3 equal parts and joined at angles of 120° to form half a hexagon.

==== Long box hive ====
The long box hive is a single-story hive that accepts enclosed frames and is worked horizontally in the manner of Kenya/Tanzanian top-bar hives. This non-stacked style had higher popularity a century ago in the Southeast United States but faded from use due to a lack of portability. With the recent popularity of horizontal top-bar hives, the long box hive is gaining renewed but limited utilization. Alternative names are "new idea hive", "single story hive", "Poppleton hive", or "long hive".

Variations:

- Long Langstroth Hive: Uses 32 standard Langstroth deep frames without any supers.
- Dartington long deep (DLD) hive: Being derived from fixing two Deep National hives back-to-back, the DLD can take up to 21 frames each 14 by 12 inches (360 mm × 300 mm). It is possible to have two colonies in the brood box; e.g., "swarm" and "parent", separated by a loose Divider Board, as there is an entrance at either end. It has half-size honey supers, which take six frames that are lighter than full supers and are correspondingly easier to lift than 12-frame National supers. The Dartington was originally developed by Robin Dartington so that he could keep bees on his London rooftop.
- Beehaus Hive: A proprietary design for a beehive launched in 2009 based on the Dartington long deep. It is a hybrid of the top-bar hive and a Langstroth hive.
- Layens Hive: Developed by Georges de Layens in 1864. This hive is a popular standard in Spain and Romania. It was also popular in Russia during the early 1900s until forced industrialization standardized all apiaries.
- ZEST Hive:
- Lazutin Hive: Developed by Fedor Lazutin
- Golden Hive: Ukrainian Hive or Einraumbeute Hive uses Dadant size frames that are rotated ninety degrees.

== Symbolism ==
The beehive is a commonly used symbol in various human cultures. In Europe, it was used by the Romans as well as in heraldry. Most heraldic representation of beehives is in the form of a skep.

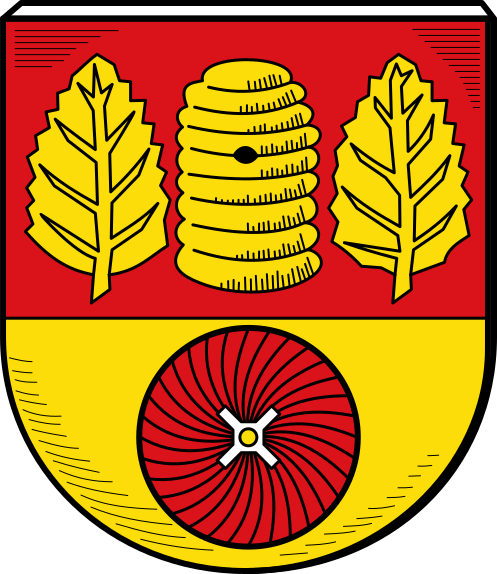
Coat of arms of Börger

Coat of arms of Hengelo

Flag of Tambov Oblast

Coat of arms of Tambov Oblast

Bees (and beehives) have some symbols often associated with them though it is not universal:

So much has been written upon the habits and virtues of bees, that it is unnecessary to enlarge upon the subject .... Suffice it to say, that they imply industry, wealth, bounty, and wisdom in the bearer.

— William Newton

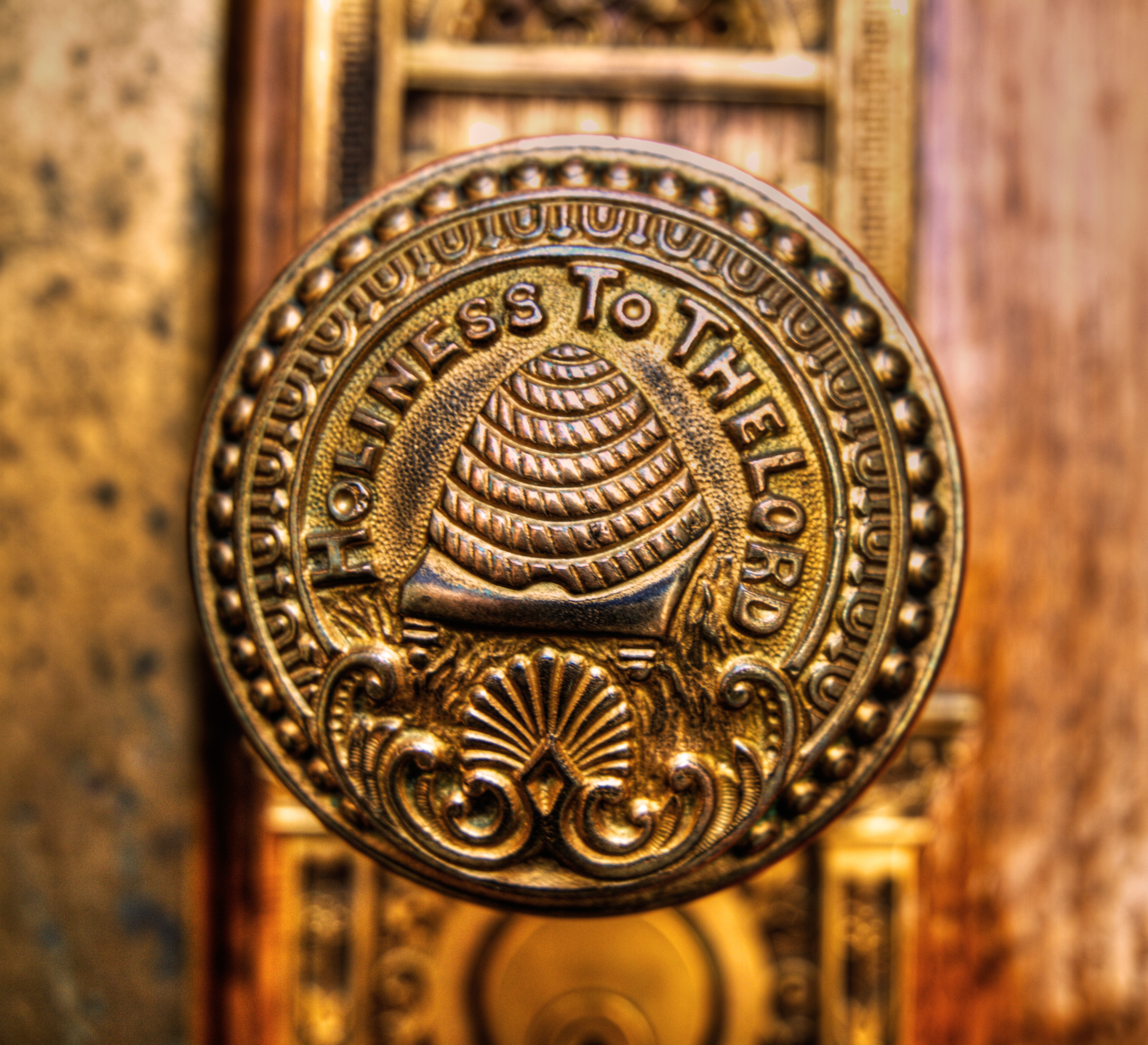
A doorknob of an LDS temple

In modern times, it is a key symbol in Freemasonry. In masonic lectures, it represents industry and cooperation, and as a metaphor cautioning against intellectual laziness, warning that "he that will so demean himself as not to be endeavoring to add to the common stock of knowledge and understanding, may be deemed a drone in the hive of nature, a useless member of society, and unworthy of our protection as Masons."

The beehive appears on the 3rd Degree emblems on the Tracing Board of Royal Cumberland No. 41, Bath and is explained as such:

The Beehive teaches us that as we are born into the world rational and intelligent beings, so ought we also to be industrious ones, and not stand idly by or gaze with listless indifference on even the meanest of our fellow creatures in a state of distress if it is in our power to help them without detriment to ourselves or our connections; the constant practice, – of this virtue is enjoined on all created beings, from the highest seraph in heaven to the meanest reptile that crawls in the dust.

— Explanation on the 8th century ritual

The beehive is also used with a similar meaning by the Church of Jesus Christ of Latter-day Saints. From Latter-day Saint usage, it has become one of the state symbols of Utah (see Deseret).

== Population, relocation and destruction ==
=== Population ===
A beekeeper populates a new hive by reproduction from an existing hive. They move brood combs, with worker bees, from existing hives for insertion into the new, empty hive. The workers, themselves, can alter cells containing eggs, to grow into queen bees. Upon hatching, the queens fight until one is left.

=== Relocation ===
Beekeepers and companies may remove unwanted honey bee nests from structures to relocate them into an artificial hive. This process is called a "cut out".

=== Destruction ===
==== Animal destruction ====
Black bears destroy hives in their quest for honey and protein-rich larvae. Grizzly bears will also eat beehives and are harder to dissuade from taking several beehives. Hives can be protected with an electrified enclosure and livestock fence "shocker" base. Systems available are grid plugged(120v) or solar (dc) for remote spots.

Hives erected as a crop shield against elephants are sometimes destroyed by elephants. These hives are hung on a single metal wire that encircles the crop field of some farms in African elephant territory. The installation is called a beehive fence and was conceived by Lucy King.

==== Human destruction ====
Humans have historically destroyed nests and hives of honey-producing bee species to obtain honey and beeswax and other bee products. Modern honey frame and centerfuge systems, such as Langstroth, are less harmful to the hive, assuming harvest will happen, and increase production at the same time.

Humans may also determine that a beehive must be destroyed in the interest of public safety or in the interest of preventing the spread of bee diseases. The U.S. state of Florida destroyed the hives of Africanized honey bees, in 1999. The state of Alaska has issued regulations governing the treatment of diseased beehives via burning followed by burial, fumigation using ethylene oxide or other approved gases, sterilization by treatment with lye, or by scorching. In New Zealand and the United Kingdom, the treatment of hives infected with the disease American foulbrood with antibiotics is prohibited, and beekeepers are required by law to destroy such colonies and hives with fire.

== See also ==
- Apidictor
