= William Broughton Carr =

British author and beekeeper (1836–1909)

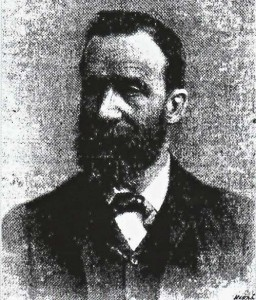
- Born: 1836; Yorkshire
- Died: 1909; London
- Occupation(s): British author beekeeper
- Known for: Inventor of the WBC Hive

William Broughton Carr (1836–1909), was a British author and beekeeper. He invented a type of beehive.

== Biography ==
William Broughton Carr was born in Bracewell, Yorkshire, in 1836, the son of Robert Carr, a butcher, and his wife Ann. Carr was a copperplate engraver and business man (printer) in Liverpool. He later lived in Higher Bebington on the Wirral and kept bees before he was invited down to London by Thomas William Cowan to set up and help edit the Bee Journal.

Carr was the co-editor of the British Bee Journal, and Bee-Keepers' Record and Adviser and also contributed articles to the 1911 Encyclopædia Britannica.

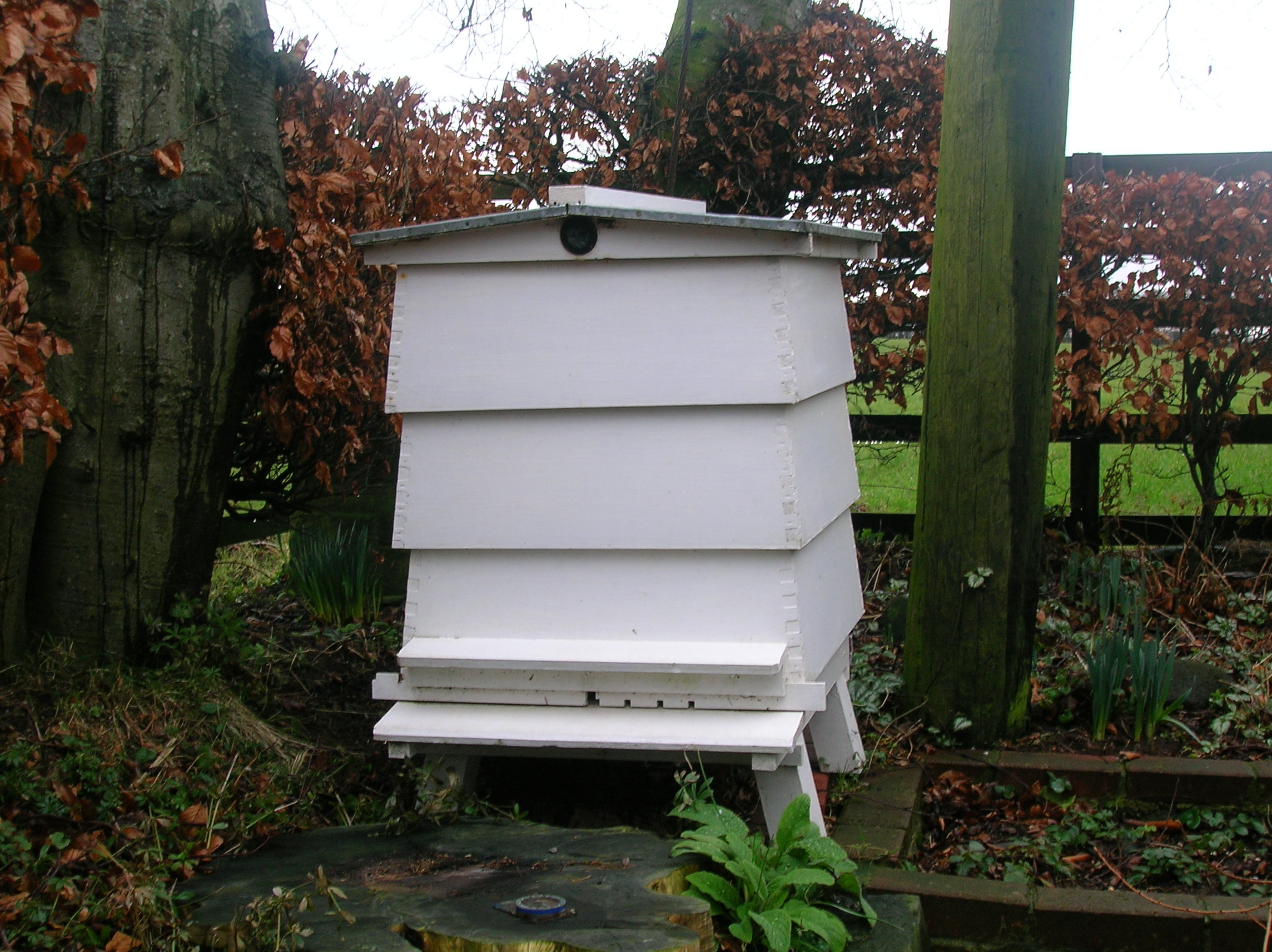
WBC hive

Carr designed the WBC style of beehive and published his design in 1890.

Carr died in London in 1909.

== Bibliography ==
- Introduction: or, early history of bees and honey. Salford: J. Roberts.
