= Grébault-Mesnil =

- Commune
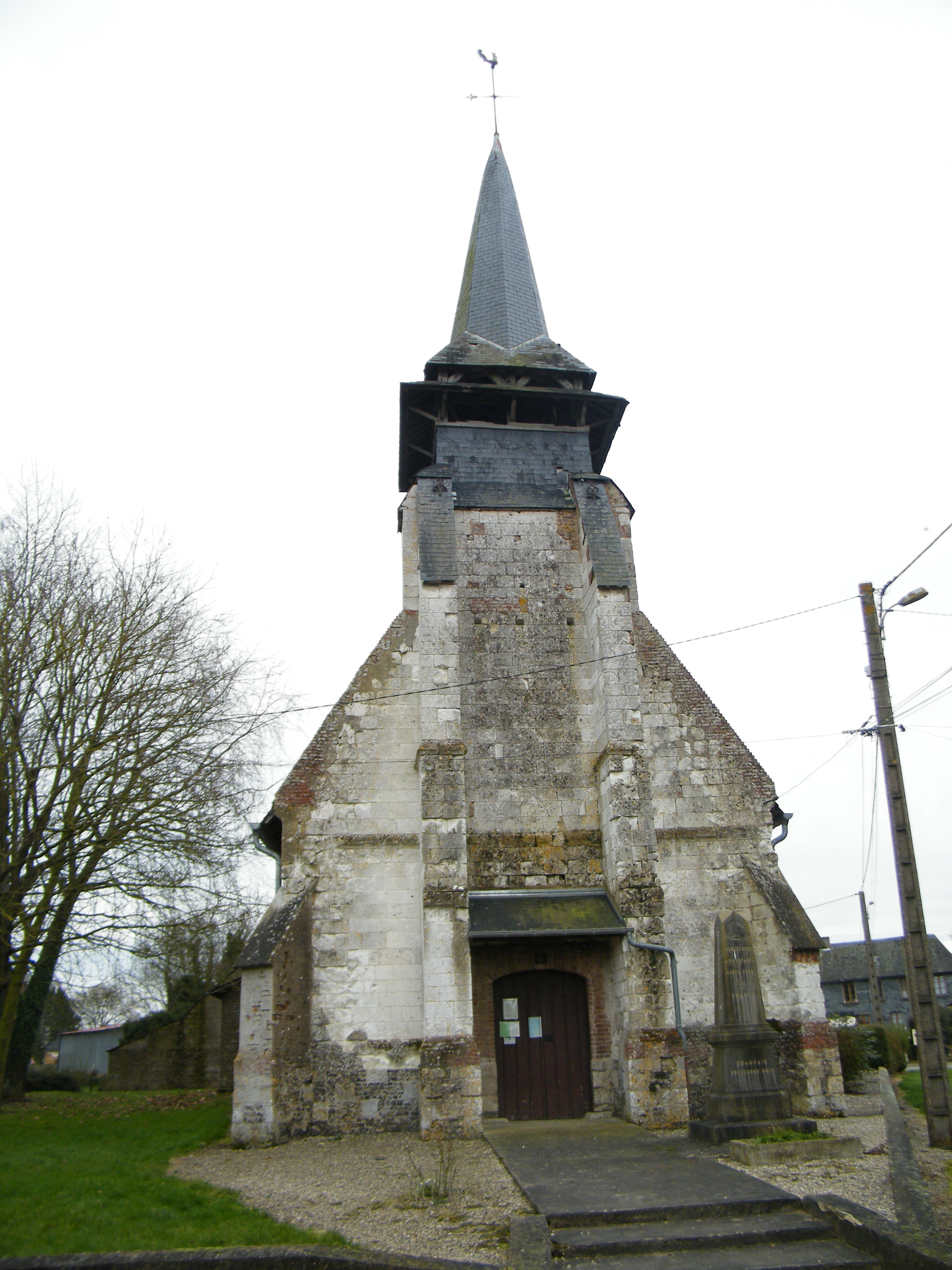
- The church in Grébault-Mesnil

- Coat of arms
- Location of Grébault-Mesnil
- Location within France Location within Hauts-de-France
- Coordinates: 50°01′34″N 1°43′17″E
- Country: France
- Region: Hauts-de-France
- Department: Somme
- Arrondissement: Abbeville
- Canton: Abbeville-2
- Intercommunality: CC Vimeu

Government
  - Mayor (2020–2026): Julien Lefebvre
- Area^{1}: 2.58 km^{2} (1.00 sq mi)
- Elevation: 94 m (308 ft)
- Highest elevation: 113 m (371 ft)
- Lowest elevation: 93 m (305 ft)
- Population (2023): 204
  - Density: 79.1/km^{2} (205/sq mi)
- Time zone: UTC+01:00 (CET)
  - Summer (DST): UTC+02:00 (CEST)
- INSEE/Postal code: 80388 /80140
- ^{1} French Land Register data, which excludes lakes, ponds, glaciers > 1 km^{2} (0.386 sq mi or 247 acres) and river estuaries.

Grébault-Mesnil (French pronunciation: [ɡʁebo menil]; Picard: Guérbeu-Mégni) is a commune in the Somme department in Hauts-de-France in northern France.

== Geography ==
The commune is situated on the D86 road, some 8 miles (12 km) southwest of Abbeville.

== Population ==
Historical population
Year	Pop.	±% p.a.
1968	159	—
1975	152	−0.64%
1982	128	−2.43%
1990	109	−1.99%
1999	113	+0.40%
2007	184	+6.28%
2012	236	+5.10%
2017	220	−1.39%
2023	204	−1.25%
Source: INSEE

== See also ==
- Communes of the Somme department
