= Hive management =

Beekeeping technique

Hive management in beekeeping refers to intervention techniques that a beekeeper may perform to ensure hive survival and to maximize hive production. Hive management techniques vary widely depending on the objectives.

== For honey production ==
The dependent factors for honey production are the duration and timing of the honey flow in a certain area. Duration and timing of a honey flow may vary widely depending on local predominant climates, weather during the honey flow and the nectar sources in the area. Good honey production sites are the far northern latitudes. In the summer, as days grow longer, bees can fly and forage for longer hours increasing production. Migrating beekeepers also take advantage of local bloom of agricultural plants or wild flowers and trees. In mountainous regions a beekeeper may migrate up the mountain as the spring and summer bloom progresses.

It has been shown that a larger bee colony will produce relatively more honey. Therefore, the early buildup and spring feeding subsequent prevention of swarming are of high priority. Several different methods such as the Demaree method, Checkerboarding and opening up the brood nest have been advocated to prevent swarming.

=== Techniques to maximize extracted honey production ===
Once a good location for an apiary is selected, techniques under the control of a beekeeper for maximizing extracted honey production depend mostly on maximizing the number of foraging bees at the peak time of the honey flow. Techniques may include interrupting brood production right before the main honey flow to free up nurse bees for foraging. A main objective is to prevent swarming.

=== Techniques to maximize comb honey production ===
Comb honey production requires many of the same techniques that are required for the production of extracted honey. In addition, the colony must be very strong and have comb building traits. Honeycomb for direct consumption as comb honey is always created the same year it is harvested.

Honey combs may also be harvested by crushing the comb and squeezing out the honey. This is the lowest cost method of producing honey. Keepers of the low-cost top-bar hives use this technique to harvest honey. The technique may also be used for the frames of Langstroth hives. The so-called cut comb are sections of sealed honey comb that are cut out of the frame. If the cut comb is to be consumed not crushed only the purest beeswax foundation may be used.

==== Techniques for maximizing Ross rounds and cassette production ====
- Killion Method
- Juniper Hill Method
- Crowding
- Shock Shook Method

== For pollination ==
see pollination management

=== Techniques for maximizing agricultural crops pollination ===
- Pollinator decline
- Pesticide toxicity to bees
- Buzz pollination

== For queen breeding ==
=== Techniques to maximize open mating ===
Techniques to maximize open mating of virgin queens center around having drones of a desired parentage saturate a queen mating yard.

=== Techniques to maximize artificial insemination ===
Artificial insemination of honeybee queens is a process used for very selective breeding of honeybee races. In the open mating of queens the source of drones cannot be fully controlled. In artificial insemination the source of drone sperm can be fully controlled and be more predictably selected than in open breeding.

== For pollen production ==
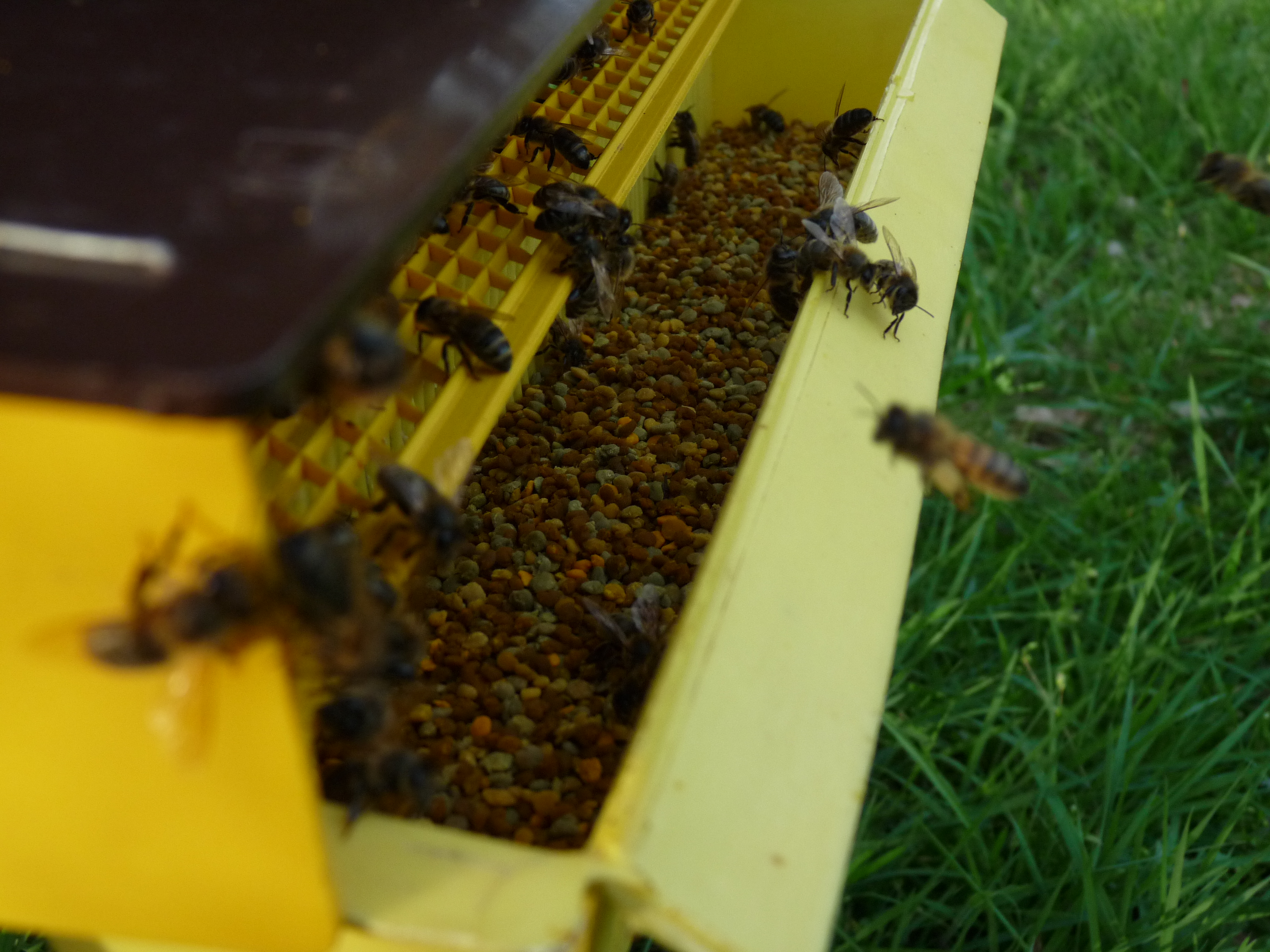
Pollen trap at the entrance

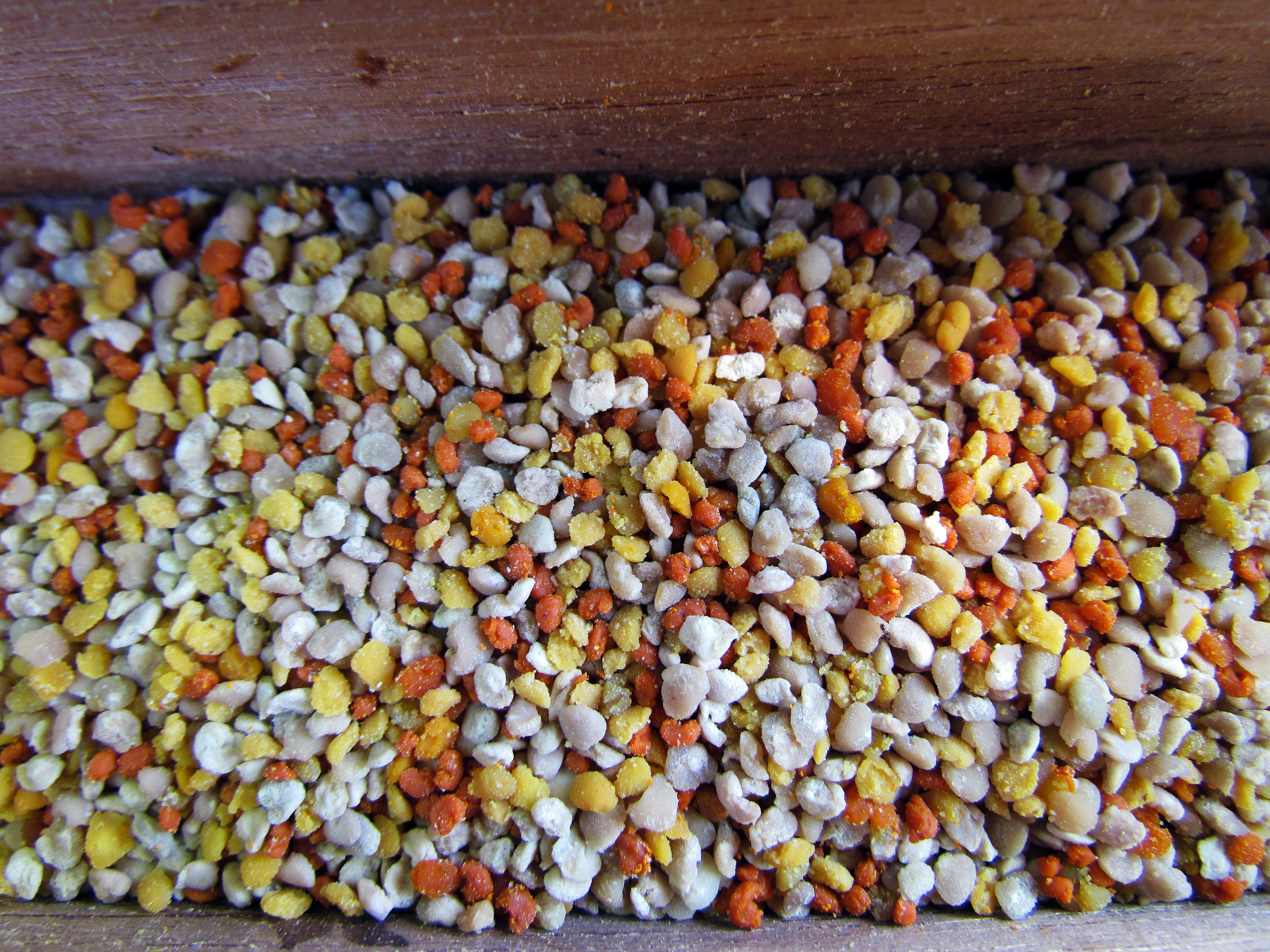
Collection of fresh bee pollen

Bee pollen is one of the byproducts of the hive. Pollen collection is usually not the main management objective. Pollen is collected by installing a pollen trap at the entrance of the bee hive. There are varying designs for pollen traps. The pollen trap makes access to the hive harder for the foraging bees. In the process of climbing through the pollen trap wires some pollen is loosened from the bee's pollen basket and falls into a collection container. Varying recommendations describe leaving the pollen trap on for a few days or for more extended periods. Pollen collection works best in an area with various pollen sources throughout the year. Fresh pollen can be frozen or dried. It is used for human consumption or fed back to the colony in early spring to speed up brood production.

== For propolis production ==
Propolis is another byproduct of the bee hive. Certain races of bees are more prone to using propolis. Propolis can be collected on special plastic propolis screens. The tendency of the bees is to use propolis as a glue to seal openings that are too small for a bee to crawl through. A propolis screen is usually put in place of an inner cover. It has small openings that are propolized by the bees. The propolis screen can be frozen which hardens the propolis. Once the propolis is frozen it can be easily knocked off and collected. Bee races that use propolis heavily are usually not desirable as it makes other hive manipulation more difficult. There is a good market for propolis in medicinal and pharmacological industries.

== For beeswax production ==
Beeswax may be a major product or a minor byproduct. The management technique that yields the highest amount of wax per hive is the top-bar hive. During the harvest of the honey from top-bar hives the whole honey comb is removed and crushed to extract the honey.

The commercial honey producers use Langstroth hive frames. The honey extraction process yields beeswax from the uncapping process. The highest quality beeswax is almost white. Lower quality beeswax from older cappings or comb is yellow or brown. Beeswax should be rendered and filtered before it is sold.

The least amount of beeswax that can be used as such, is produced in Ross rounds or cassette type comb honey production. Wax and honey are not separated and are consumed together.

Tha ability and tendency to build wax comb differs between the honeybee races. It also differs between colonies. A newly hived swarm produces wax and builds comb very quickly.

== For royal jelly production ==
The production of royal jelly is most dependent on the proper genetics of the queen. Queens and drones are selectively bred to increase the production of royal jelly. A good yield per hive is 5 kg per year.

== For apitoxin production ==
Bee venom (apitoxin) is obtained by stimulating the bee with an electric current that incites them to sting, releasing a drop of venom onto a glass slide. The crystallized venom can be collected and processed. In order to get 1 gram of dry venom, it is necessary to collect the apitoxin of 10,000 to 15,000 bees.

== For bee brood production ==
Bee brood as such is generally not a commercial commodity. However, bee brood is edible, and is used as a food in Asia and Africa.

== For the production of nucs ==
Hive management techniques to multiply colonies use the bees natural tendency to swarm by simulating a swarm. Nucs are bought and sold usually in the spring time. The advantage to packaged bees is that the bees are on established frames with a laying queen and developing brood. A fast developing nuc can be transferred to a full hive box and may produce honey in the same year.

=== Walk-away split ===
In a walk-away split, frames with eggs and worker bees are removed and the bees will create a queen cell out of a suitable egg. Once the queen hatches, successfully mates and returns to the hive, the hive will be queenright.

== For bee package production ==
A package of bees is made of a queen and 3 to 5 pounds of bees, typically around 20000 bees. The bees are shipped in a cage clustered around a caged queen. The queen is typically unrelated to the bees, so the cage creates a barrier between the bees and the queen. Packages are usually shipped in the spring from regions of mild winter climates to areas that have more severe winters.
