= Checkerboarding (beekeeping) =

Checkerboarding is a term used in beekeeping that describes a specific hive management technique to prevent swarming. The technique was developed by Walt Wright, a long-time beekeeper from Tennessee.

Checkerboarding takes advantage of the bee colony's primary motivation, which is survival as survival of the existing colony takes priority over swarm preparation and swarming. Bees will not prepare for a reproductive swarm if they perceive the survival of the existing colony might be jeopardized. It is hypothesized that swarm preparation starts in the late winter. The over-wintering colony consumes honey and expands the brood volume. At this point, the bee colony apparently senses that it has enough remaining honey stores and a large enough brood nest to risk swarm preparation. The bee colony's first activity of swarm preparation is to reduce the brood volume by creating additional stores inside the brood area. As brood emerges, selected cells are back-filled with honey, nectar, or pollen. Later into the season, as space for egg laying decreases the queen will not be able to lay as many eggs. This forces the queen to diet and lose weight so she becomes fit for the swarm flight.

Apparently, the first time this type of backfilling behavior starts is the best time to do the Checkerboarding intervention. It requires filling two hive boxes above the broodnest each alternately with capped honey-filled frames and empty drawn frames. Alternating empty drawn combs above the brood nest "fools" the bees into thinking they don't have enough stores yet for swarming and causes them to expand the brood nest, giving both a bigger field force and avoiding reproductive swarming.

Timing the checkerboarding intervention is very important (note that all these times are different reference points that refer to the same time in the United States). The best time for the intervention is:

- when the elm trees bloom
- four weeks before the maple trees bloom
- five weeks before redbud trees bloom
- eight weeks before the start of the apple tree blossom
- nine weeks before the peak of the apple tree blossom

== Sources ==
- Michael Bush (January 17, 2006). "Thread: Experiment participants wanted". Beesource.
