= Checkerboarding =

Checkerboarding may refer to:

- Checkerboarding (beekeeping)
- Checkerboarding (land)
- Checkerboard rendering, a 3D computer graphics technique
