= Pollen sac =

Pollen sac may refer to:

- Structures in plants that hold pollen
- Bee pollen, sacs or balls of pollen packed by bees
