= Apiary =

Place containing beehives of honey bees

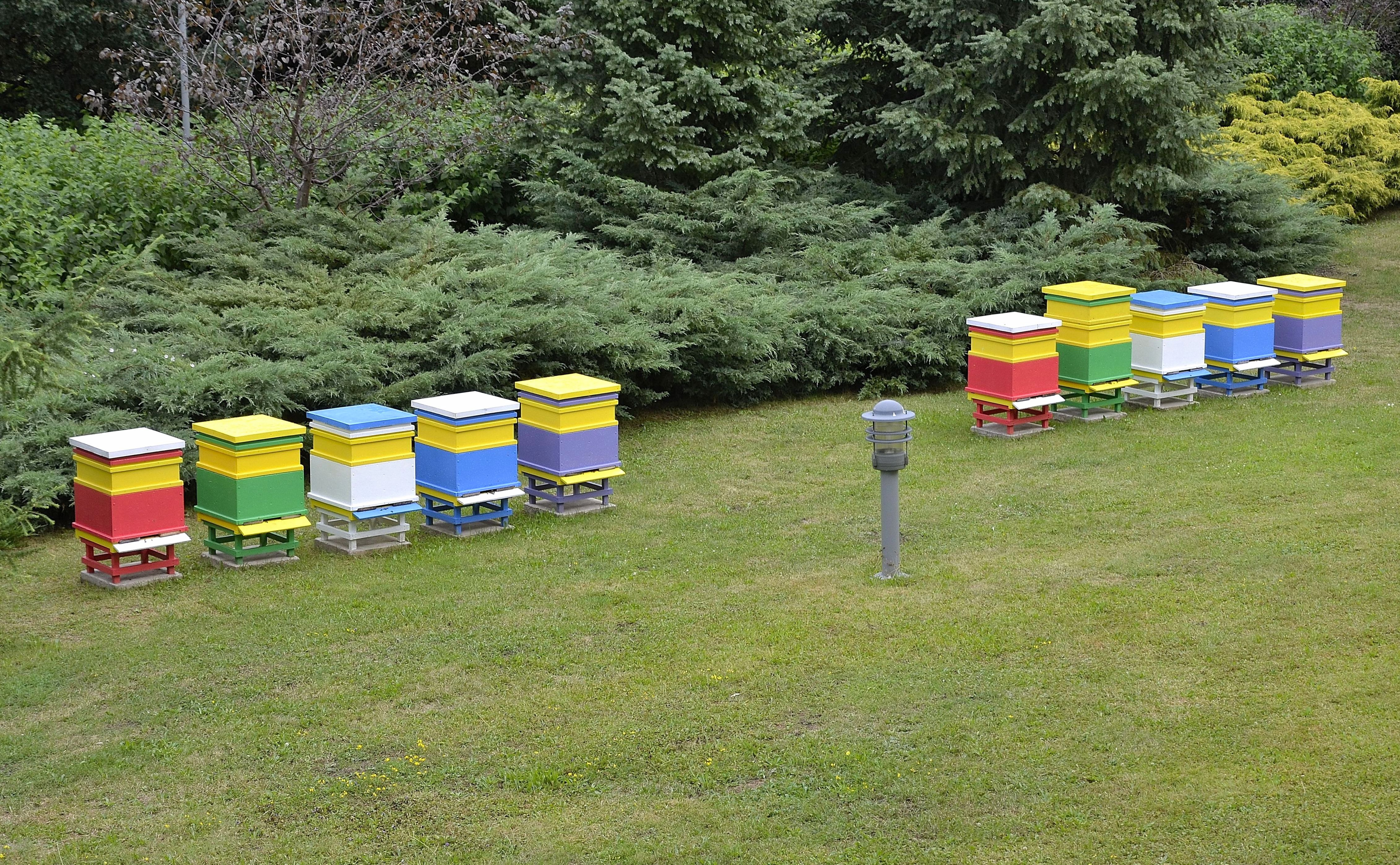
An apiary in Warsaw, Poland.

An apiary (also known as a bee yard) is a location where beehives of honey bees are kept. Apiaries come in many sizes and can be rural or urban depending on the honey production operation.

== History ==
Apiaries have been found in ancient Egypt from prior to 2422 BCE where hives were constructed from moulded mud. Throughout history apiaries and bees have been kept for honey and pollination purposes all across the globe. Due to the definition of an apiary as a location where hives are kept, its history can be traced as far back as that of beekeeping itself.

== Etymology ==
The first known usage of the word "apiary" was in 1654. The base of the word comes from the Latin word "apis" meaning "bee", leading to "apiarium" or "beehouse" and eventually "apiary." Beekeepers may be referred to as "apiarists" or "ones who tend apiaries."

== Structure ==
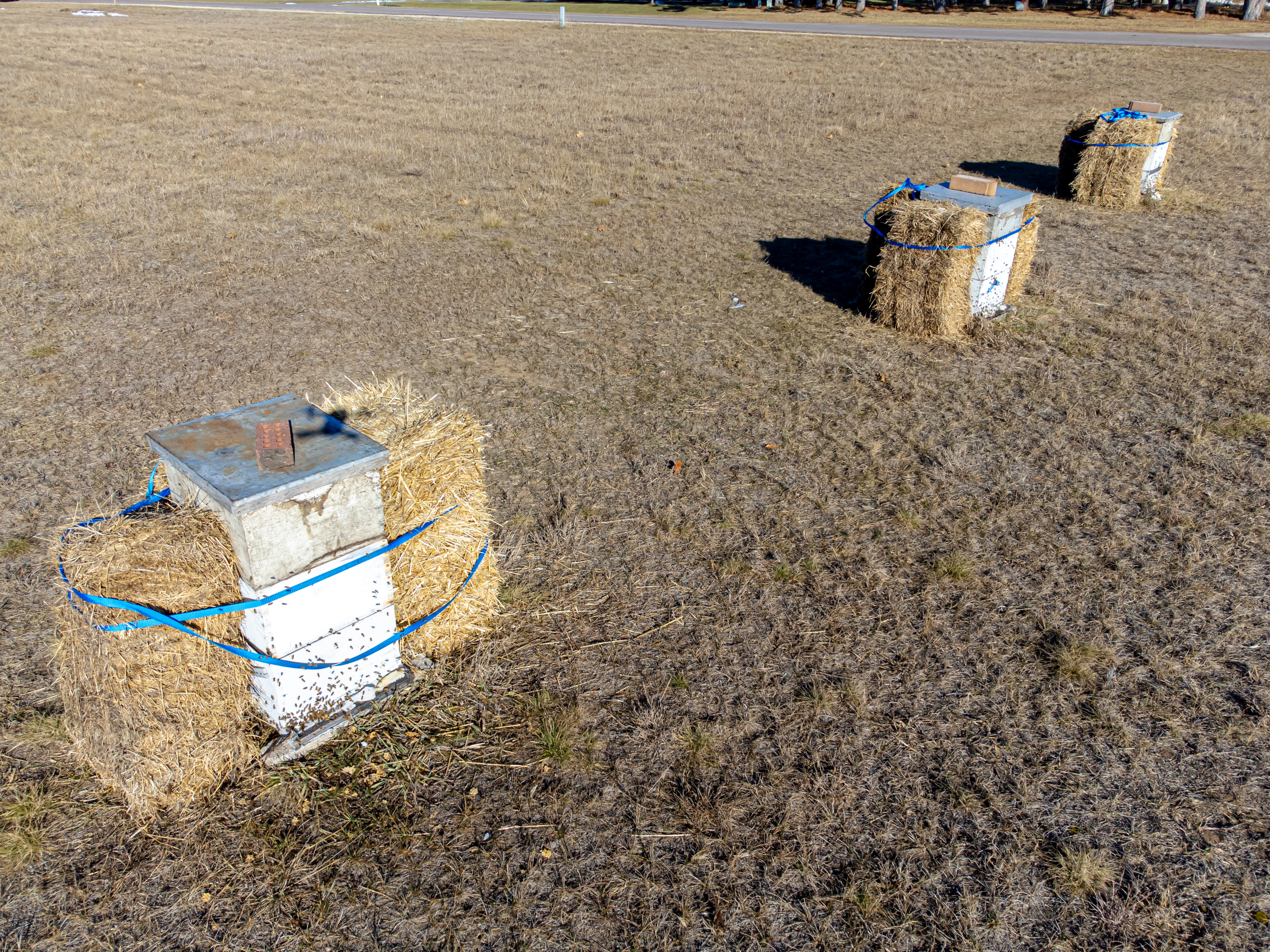
Urban beekeeping with hay bales strapped to them on 3 sides to winterize and protect from the wind knocking it over

Apiaries may vary by location and according to the needs of the individual operation. Typically, apiaries are composed of several individual hives. In the case of urban beekeeping, hives are often located on high ground, which requires less space than hives located at lesser altitudes. To direct the bees' path of flight in populous urban areas, beekeepers often construct tall fences which force the bees to fly higher and widen their search for food.

== Location ==
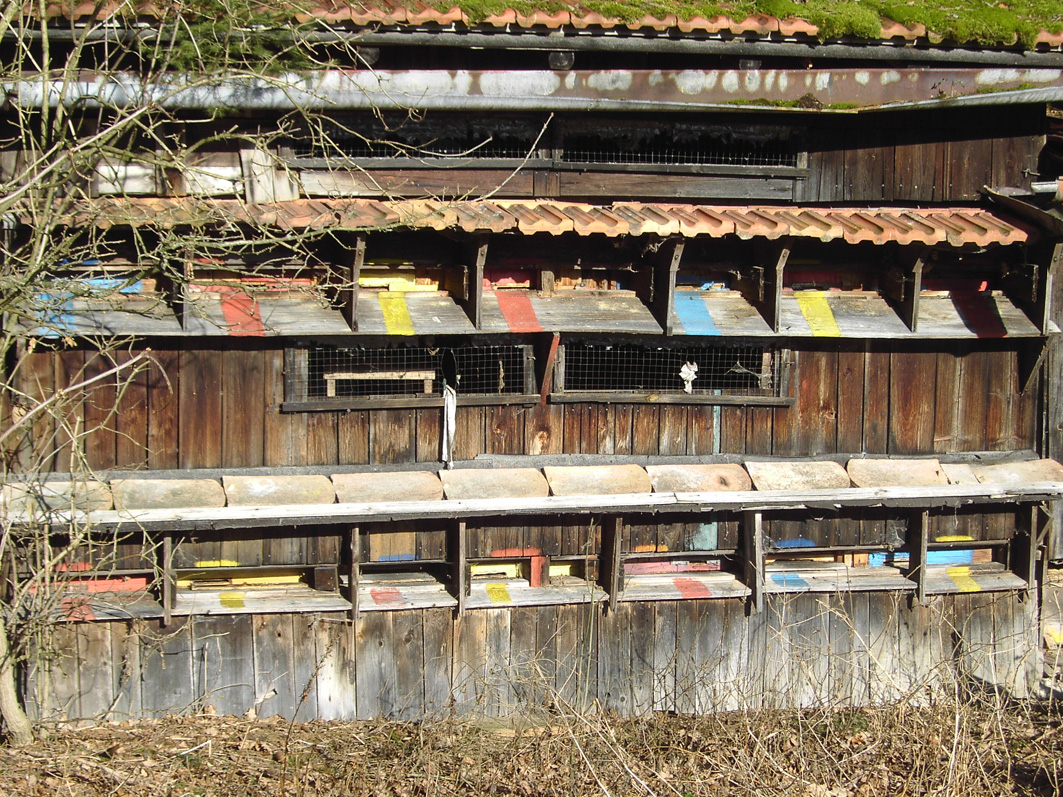
Apiary (Bienenhaus) in Upper Bavaria, Germany

Apiaries are usually situated on high ground in order to avoid moisture collection, though in proximity to a consistent water source—whether natural or man-made—to ensure the bees' access. Additionally, ample nectar supplies for the bees as well as relatively large amounts of sun are considered. They are often situated close to orchards, farms, and public gardens, which require frequent pollination to develop a positive feedback loop between the bees and their food sources. This also economizes on the bees' pollination and the plants' supply of nectar.

An apiary may have hive management objectives other than honey production, including queen rearing and mating. In the Northern Hemisphere, east and south facing locations with full morning sun are preferred. In hot climates, shade is needed and may have to be artificially provided if trees are not present. Other factors include air and water drainage and accessibility by truck, distance from phobic people, and protection from vandalism.

In the USA there are beekeepers—from hobbyists to commercial—in every state. The most lucrative areas for American honey production are Florida, Texas, California, and the Upper Midwest. For paid pollination, the main areas are California, the Pacific Northwest, the Great Lakes States, and the Northeast. Rules and regulations by local ordinances and zoning laws also affect apiaries.

In recent years US honey production has dropped and the U.S. imports 16% of the world's honey. Internationally, the largest honey producing exporters are China, Germany, and Mexico.

== Size ==
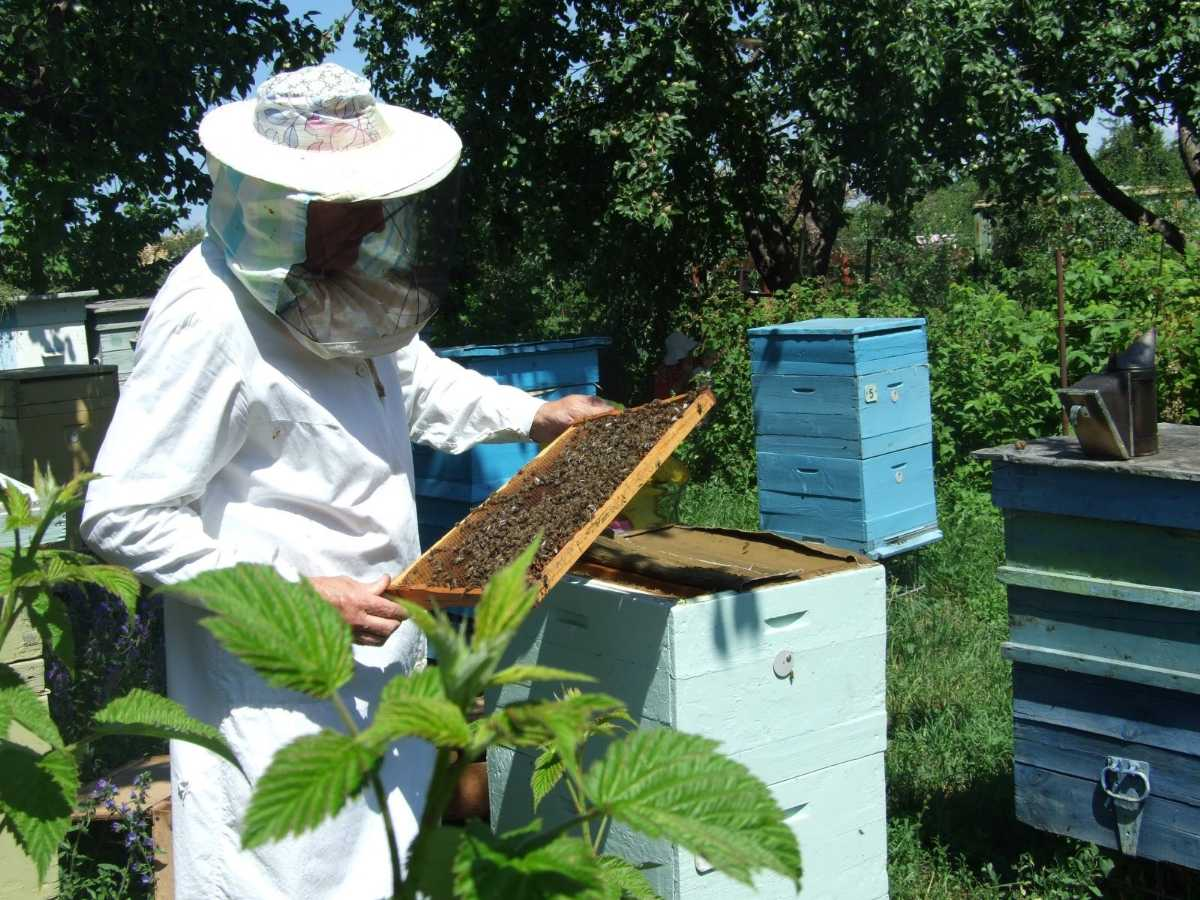
Apiary in Bashkortostan, Russia

Apiary size refers not only to the spatial size of the apiary, but also to the number of bee families and bees by weight. The larger the number of hives held in an apiary the higher the yield of honey relative to resources, often resulting in apiaries growing with time and experience. Additionally a higher number of hives within an apiary can increase the quality of the honey produced. Depending on the nectar and pollen sources in a given area, the maximum number of hives that can be placed in one apiary can vary. If too many hives are placed into an apiary, the hives compete with each other for scarce resources. This can lead to lower honey, flower pollen and bee bread yields, as well as higher transmission of disease and robbing.

The size of an apiary is determined by not only the resources available but also by the variety of honey being cultivated, with more complex types generally cultivated in smaller productions. For more specific details on varieties see the classification portion of the honey article. The purpose of the apiary also affects size: apiaries are kept by commercial and local honey producers, as well as by universities, research facilities, and local organizations. Many such organizations provide community programming and educational opportunities. This results in varying sizes of apiaries depending on usage characteristics.

== Disease and decline ==
Apiaries may decline due to a scarcity of resources which can lead to robbing of nearby hives. This is especially an issue in urban areas where there may be a limited amount of resources for bees and a large number of hives may be affected.

Apiaries may suffer from a wide variety of diseases and infestations. Throughout history apiaries and bees have been kept for honey and pollination purposes all across the globe. Due to the definition of apiary as a location where hives are kept its history can be traced as far back as that of beekeeping itself. Colony collapse disorder due to pesticide-resistant mites has damaged bee populations. Beyond mites there are a wide variety of diseases which may affect the hives and lead to the decline or collapse of a colony. For this reason many beekeepers choose to keep apiaries of limited size to avoid mass infection or infestation.

== See also ==
- Beekeeping
