= Urban beekeeping =

Practice of keeping bee colonies in urban areas

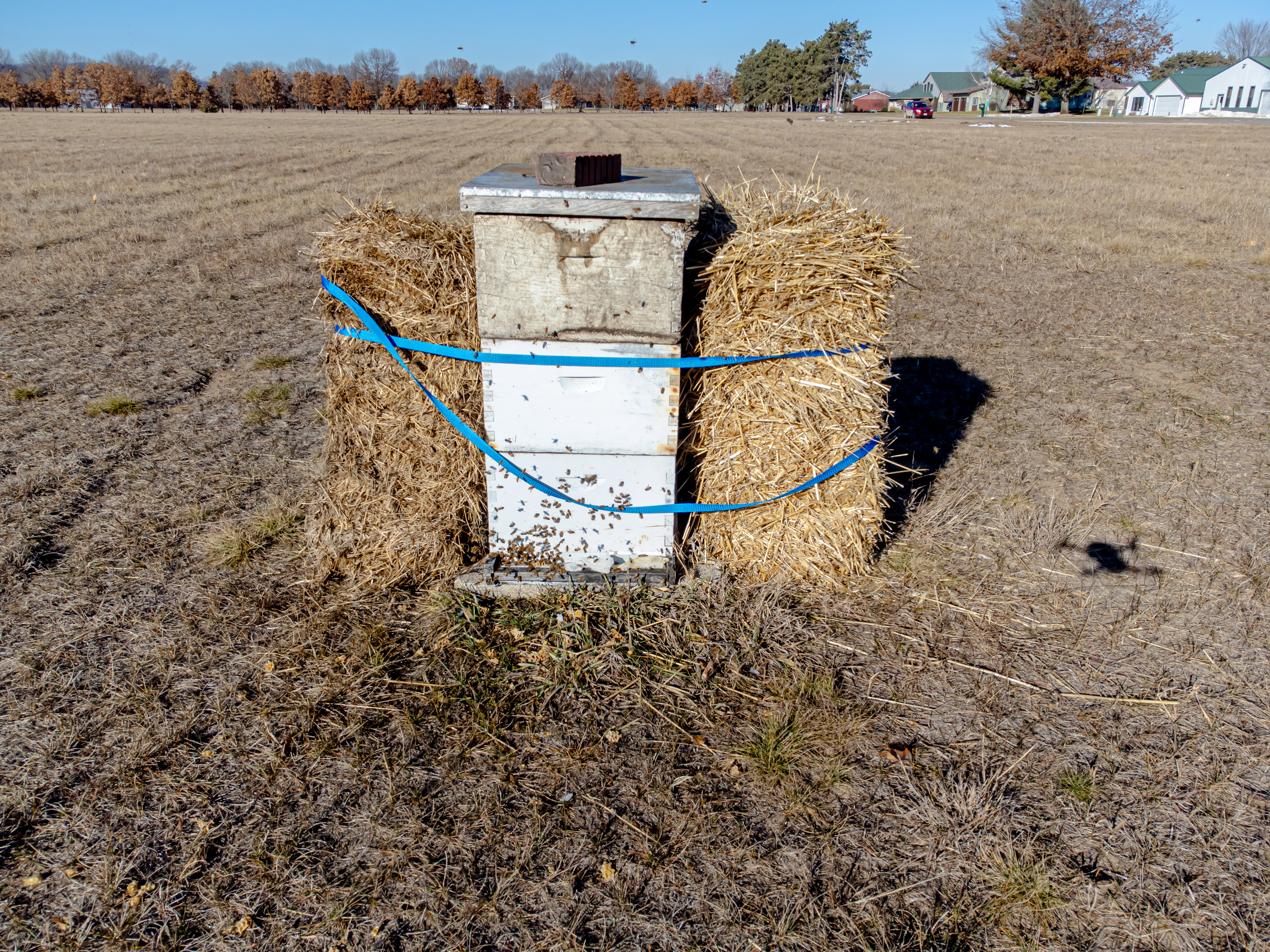
Using hay bales strapped to a hive on 3 sides to winterize and protect from the wind knocking it over

Urban beekeeping is the practice of keeping bee colonies (hives) in towns and cities. It is also referred to as hobby beekeeping or backyard beekeeping. Bees from cities apiaries are said to be "healthier and more productive than their country cousins". Once banned, this practice became significantly popular among urban dwellers, especially those interested in farming or related fields. The movement gained momentum in places like Paris in the 1980s and has since spread globally, reflecting a broader interest in sustainable, artisanal food production. Nowadays, this production is most popular in major cities like London, New York, Detroit, Paris, Istanbul, Seoul, and many more.

Bees help to fertilize plants through the transfer of pollen. This not only supports urban agriculture and green spaces but also enhances the overall biodiversity and local food systems of city environments. Urban beekeeping can lead to higher yields in community gardens and boost the health of local flora, fostering a connection between humans and nature.

Additionally, bees in urban settings often have access to a wide variety of plants and flowers, which helps produce unique, high-quality honey. While urban beekeeping requires careful management to address challenges like limited space and ensuring the bees do not become a nuisance, it has become an important part of urban sustainability efforts and a popular hobby that connects city dwellers with nature.

== History ==
Most cities in North America once prohibited the keeping of bees, but in recent years, beekeepers have succeeded in overturning these bans. Many urban areas now attempt to regulate the activity; while registering beehives is often mandatory, a high proportion of urban beekeepers do not inform the city. The popularity of urban beekeeping was growing rapidly c. 2012 perhaps due to its inclusion in the local food movement. Between 1999 and 2012, London saw a 220% increase in beekeepers.

== Challenges and concerns ==
Due to the increase in artificial beehives in London notably, there is mounting evidence that honey bees are greatly outnumbering wild pollinators. The actions of private companies adding more hives are upsetting the preventive actions of pollinator conservation groups.

Swarming is a common occurrence in beekeeping. While harmless, the sight of a swarming colony in urban areas can make people fearful. Limited resources are another concern for urban beekeeping. As cities have limited greenspaces, the increasing popularity of the hobby may lead to lower honey yields, as has been reported in London and New York City. According to a 2015 research study, urban environments have also been shown to favor the viability and transmission of some disease agents that affect honey bees.

== Benefits ==
Managed urban honeybee colonies can also provide pollination for urban green spaces and allow apiarists to collect critical information about the ecological conditions of an urban environment based on the condition of the bee colony.

Due to the urbanized setting, harvesting from hives is more convenient for beekeepers. The collected honey from the harvest can later be sold directly to the same community, strengthening the local economy.

== Urban beekeeping cities ==
Some cities have active beekeeping communities, while others offer plentiful parks and gardens but have few apiaries.

=== North America ===
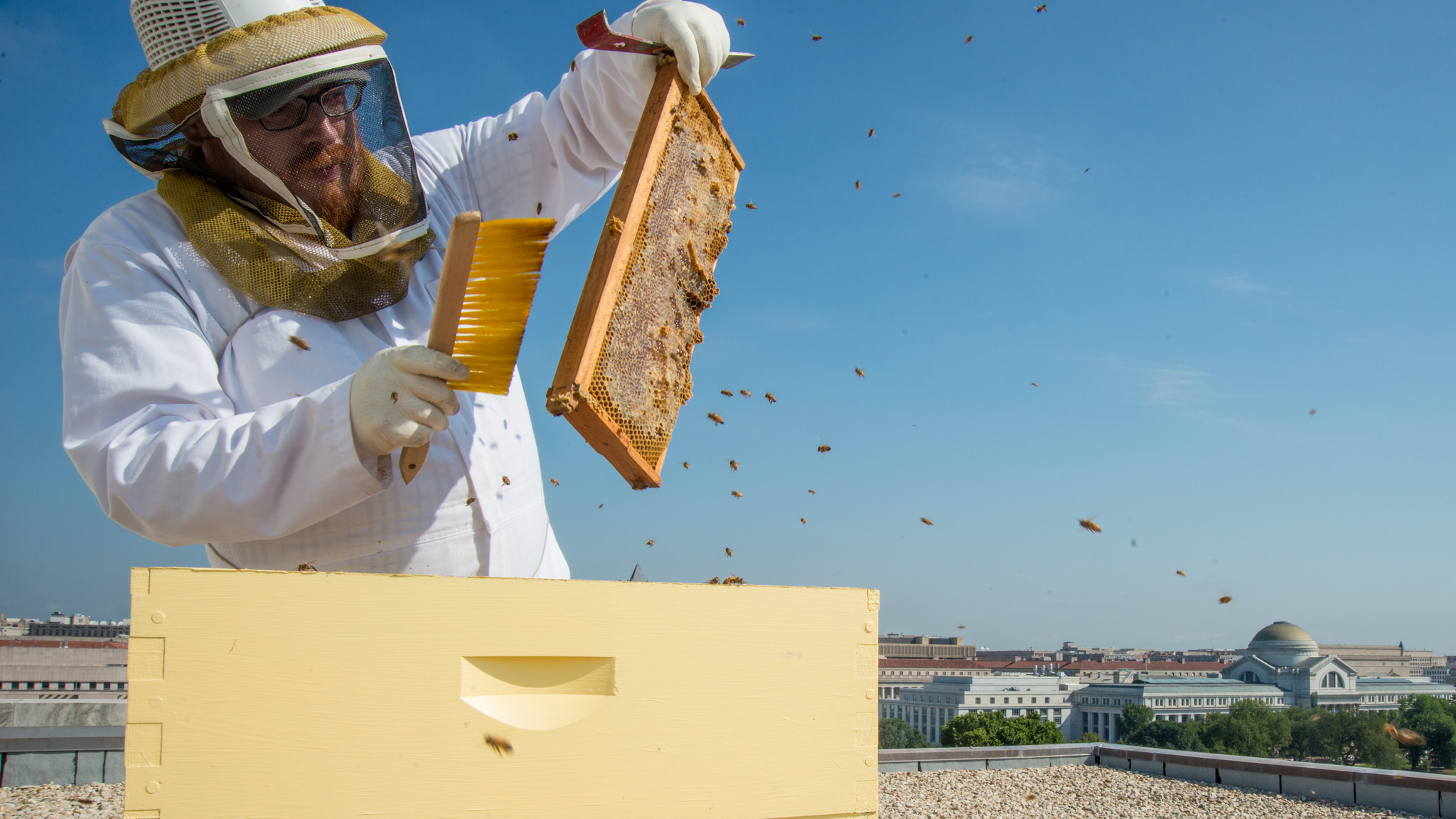
USDA technician harvesting honey on top of the Whitten Building in Washington, D.C.

==== Detroit ====
Detroit is home to a flourishing population of native bees and a variety of greenspaces. The city has several urban farms (not all of which maintain hives), including the Michigan Urban Farming Initiative, the Hantz Farm, D-Town Farm, and Earthworks Urban Farms. In 2017, the Detroit Hives nonprofit was founded with the mission to improve communities for people and pollinators, especially for underserved populations, by transforming vacant lots into urban bee farms. Detroit Hives is the first to create an educational apiary in the City of Detroit. In 2019, Detroit Hives founded National Urban Beekeeping Day, celebrated annually on July 19, as a day of education and awareness to support urban beekeepers and the ethical treatment of pollinators living within the urban landscape.

==== Chicago ====
In 2003, Richard M. Daley, then Mayor of Chicago, had two beehives placed atop City Hall. Michael S. Thompson was put in charge of their care. Subsequently, the bee population in the city has grown.

In 2013, a ban on beekeeping was defeated in the suburb of Skokie. The town may regulate backyard beekeeping in the future.

==== Milwaukee ====
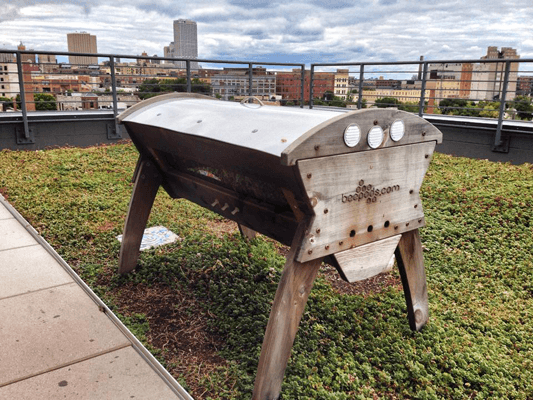
A Beepod Vented-Top-Bar Hive on the roof of a non-profit, CORE/El Centro, overlooks downtown Milwaukee and serves as an education location to teach new beekeepers.

In 2010, Milwaukee, Wisconsin, passed a beekeeping ordinance allowing individuals to practice beekeeping in the urban center of the city. Urban beekeepers take part in Milwaukee's Community Pollinator Initiative.

==== Montreal ====
Montreal's beehives are regulated by the governmental agency MAPQ. This agency enforces a set of regulations surrounding the installation of a beehive in order to protect the health of colonies, but these rules are rarely restrictive enough to deter committed hobbyists.

Since 2014, the Westmount Public Library has had a public honeybee hive on its roof featuring live inspections every two weeks during the summer months for the general public.

As part of their 135th anniversary, Birks Group installed three honeybee hives on the roof of their downtown headquarters.

In the summer of 2014, the Accueil Bonneau homeless facility launched a pilot project introducing their itinerant community to the art of beekeeping as a means of re-engaging them in a fulfilling and meaningful hobby.

Most of the public beekeeping initiatives stem from companies offering beekeeping services that make it more accessible to urban dwellers, such as Alveole, Apiguru, or Miel Montreal. The movement towards generating local produce is part of the reason beekeeping is becoming increasingly popular in this metropolitan city.

==== New York ====
Until 2010, beekeeping was illegal in New York City, but this had little effect on the many New Yorkers who built and maintained hives. Prior to being recognized by the city, urban beekeeping had become an established hobby, and a support network of organizations, blogs, and supply stores were already in place. When the ban was lifted, only the non-aggressive Apis Mellifera species was allowed to be kept. While registering beehives is required, as of 2012 only half of the 400 bee colonies thought to be situated on New York rooftops had been reported to the city.

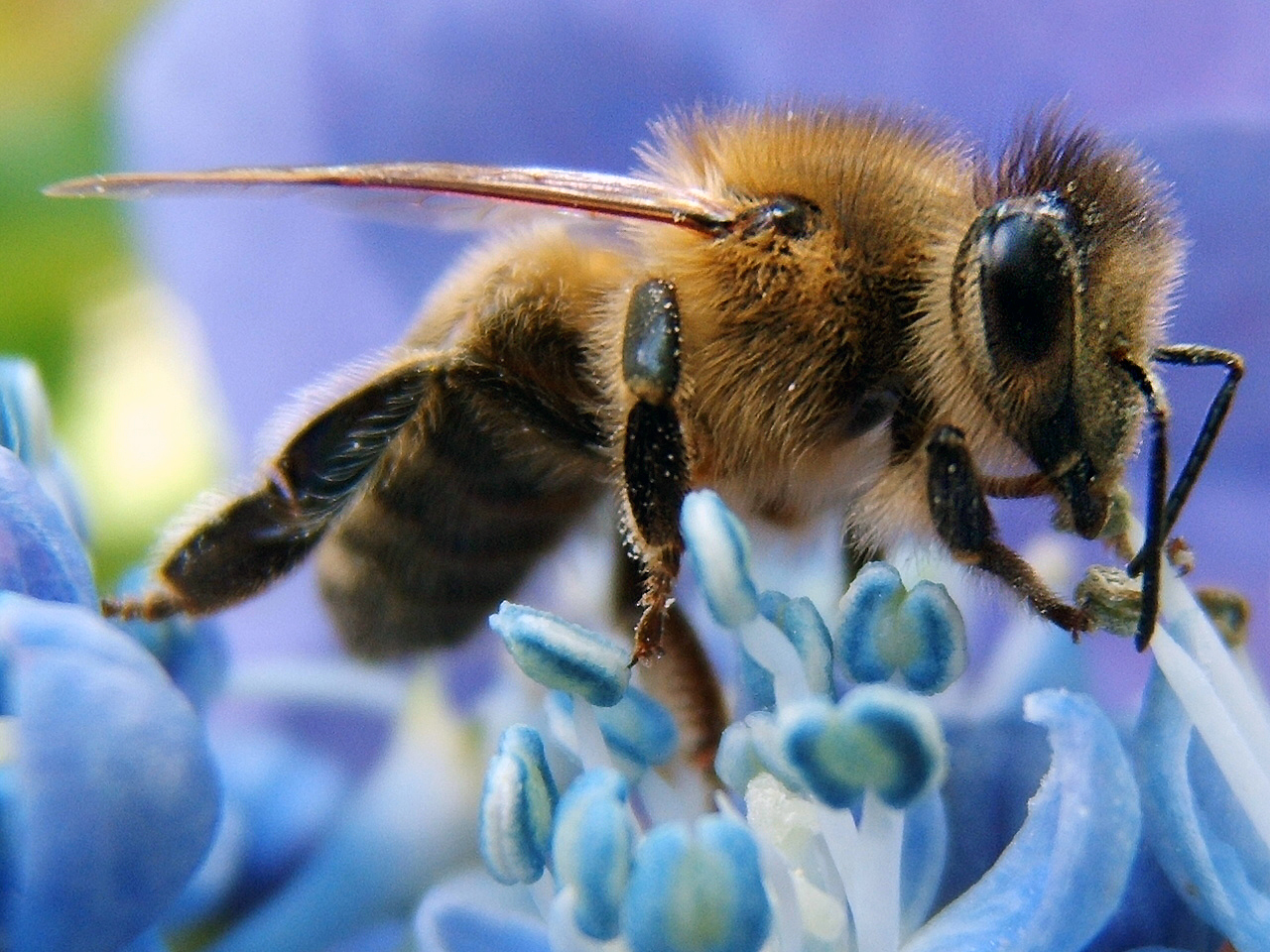
Western honey bee

In New York, there are beehives at InterContinental The Barclay Hotel, the Waldorf-Astoria Hotel, the York Prep School, the Brooklyn Navy Yard, the Bank of America Tower (New York City) and the Empire State Building.

==== Toronto ====
Hives have been kept discreetly in Toronto for many years. Several beekeepers kept around fifty hives each along the Don River in the beginning of the 20th century. There was also a beekeeping co-op near the Don Valley Brick Works into the late 1950s. Mayor William Dennison kept nineteen colonies in his Jarvis Street backyard during the 1970s. During this time, beekeeping equipment could be bought in the downtown Little Italy and Little Portugal neighbourhoods.

As of 2015, Toronto does not have any bylaws governing beekeeping, so the Ontario Bees Act applies. The Act does not address urban beekeeping but contains a 30 m (98 ft) set back requirement for property lines, and a 10 m (33 ft) set back requirement for highways. However, the rule has gone largely unenforced as few urban lots are spacious enough to meet requirements concerning proximity to property lines, dwellings, and highways. In 2011, there were 107 registered hives in Toronto.

Some of the many Toronto landmarks that host honey bee hives include: the Fort York historic site, the Four Seasons Centre for the Performing Arts rooftop, the University of Toronto, the Amsterdam Brewing Company rooftop, and the Fairmont Royal York hotel.

==== Vancouver ====
Often regarded as a green and sustainable city, the City of Vancouver has recognized hobby beekeeping in residential areas by issuing guidelines and requiring hives to be registered. Bees are kept at Vancouver Convention Centre and Vancouver City Hall.

==== Los Angeles ====
Los Angeles has a long history of beekeeping. The first two honey bee colonies arrived in California by way of the Isthmus of Panama, in 1853. Imported by Christopher H. Shelton, they were the only survivors of the long trip from New York to San Francisco. Bees were purchased on the docks of San Francisco for $150 and then brought south to Los Angeles. The bees arrived in Los Angeles on September 4, 1854. In April 1855, the colonies cast out two swarms which were sold for another $150. At this time, the honey generated by the bees was sold for $1.50 per pound. Italian bees ("Apis mellifera ligustica"), considered superior to the German variety ("Apis mellifera mellifera"), were introduced in January 1855.

By the 1860s, beekeeping was common in Los Angeles with some individuals owning 25 hives. Wild honey was collected in significant quantities throughout the foothills. The honey was sent to San Francisco for sale. A large colony was found in the San Fernando Valley, some estimate it contained 8 to 10 tons of honey:

The hive is located in a rift which penetrates the rock to a depth of approximately 160 feet. The orifice is 30 feet long and 17 feet wide with four passages. This rift was discovered to be the nesting place of a swarm of bees that was seen to come out in a nearly solid column, one foot in diameter. Certain parties have endeavored to descend to the immense store of honey collected by the bees but were invariably driven back, and one man lost his life in the effort.

In 1873, the Los Angeles County Beekeepers Association was founded. In 1879, Los Angeles lawmakers banned beekeeping within city limits based on the false belief that honey bees damaged the citrus crop (one of the largest industries in the Los Angeles area). By 1917, there were calls to repeal the "ancient ordinance"; many were illegally keeping hives anyway, but lawmakers did not act. It was not until 2015 that the 136-year-old ordinance was repealed by the city council.

==== Kansas City (Kansas) ====
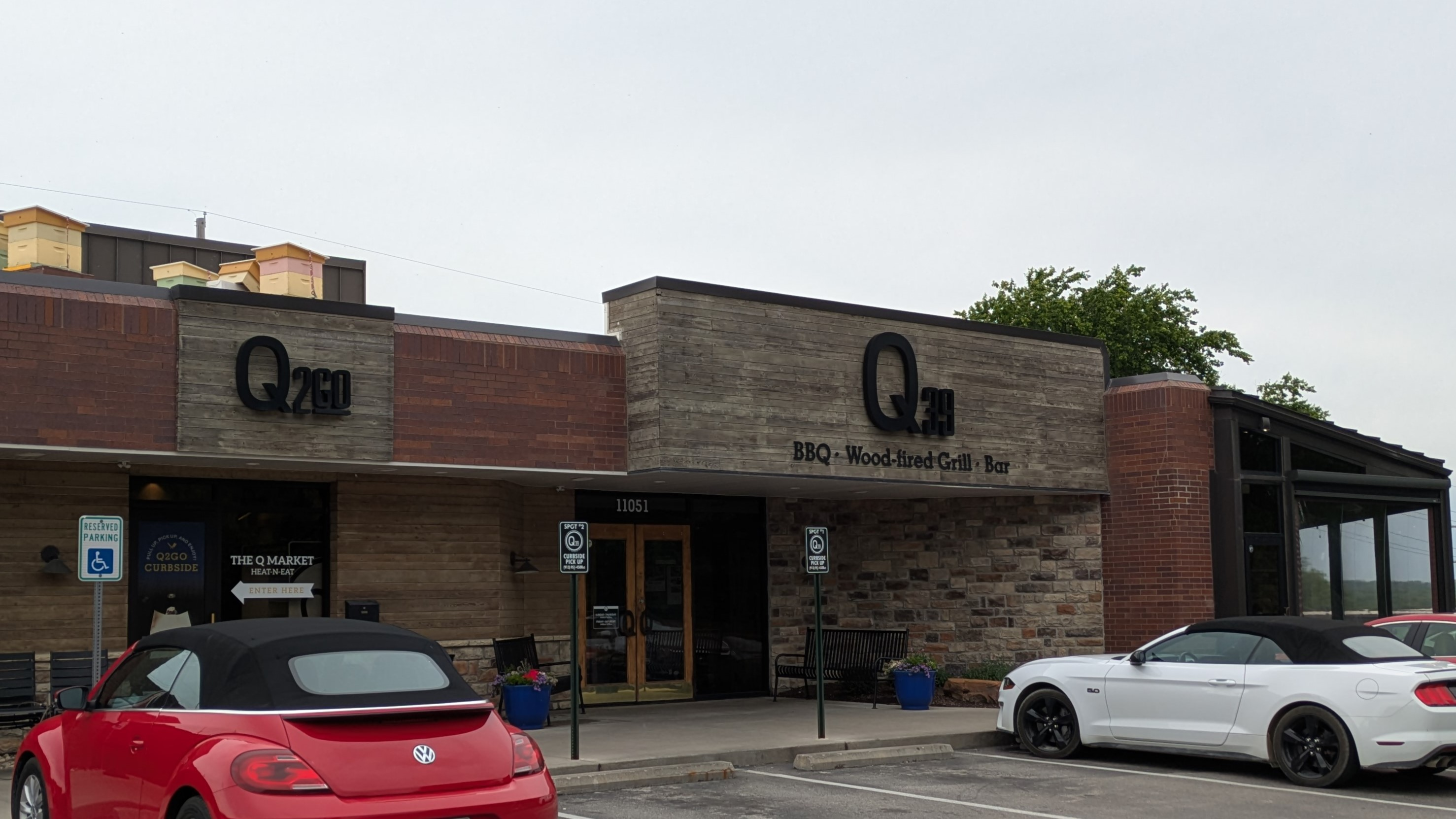
Bee hives visible on the roof of the Q39 South barbecue restaurant in Overland Park, Kansas

Kansas City and its surrounding suburban areas are home to a number of urban apiaries and backyard beekeepers. While many cities and towns have specific ordinances regarding the practice of keeping bees, the Wyandotte County (Kansas City, Kansas) municipal code makes no mention of honey bees, beekeeping, bee hives, or any related terminology.

Kansas City has an active community of urban beekeepers who communicate, educate, and gather with one another throughout the year. The Northeastern Kansas Beekeeping Association is one such organization whose territory includes Kansas City, Kansas. Johnson County, which is considered part of the Kansas City metro area, is home to a growing number of suburban cities allowing their residents to keep bees within city limits.

=== Europe ===
==== London ====
Beekeeping in London has become increasingly popular. The number of beekeepers rose 220% between 1999 and 2012 with other figures showing a 200% increase between 2008 and 2013. As of 2012, an estimated 3,200 apiaries exist in London. The density of hives in London is much greater than in other areas of the UK, and this has led to concerns that city green spaces may not provide sufficient forage to sustain growing bee populations.

The UK government has aided the rise of beekeeping in cities by releasing a plastic beehive purpose-built for urban beekeeping called Beehaus, which is supported by quango Natural England. Organizations supporting urban beekeeping in London include The London Beekeeper's Association, which holds monthly meetings, provides mentoring to new beekeepers, and lends out beekeeping supplies.

Bees are kept at significant locations such as the department store Fortnum & Mason, Lambeth Palace, Buckingham Palace, the London Stock Exchange, the Natural History Museum, the Tate Modern, and at the Royal Lancaster Hotel. Hives once stood atop the Bank of England.

==== Istanbul ====
Urban beekeeping is a growing hobby and industry in Istanbul. Beehives can be found in city parks and on high-rise building terraces. Beekeeping in the city, especially in its outer districts, is supported by the municipal government, İBB. Hotels like The Ritz-Carlton in Istanbul also reportedly have urban beehives for their restaurant's honey needs.

Urban beekeeping has been described as a difficult hobby in İstanbul, which has fewer green spaces compared to other cities in Turkey. Unregistered beehives can be spotted in some parks in downtown districts of İstanbul.

Hasan Efe from the Apiculture Research Institute stated that beekeeping in İstanbul's city center could harm the insects' physiology, adding that gas from vehicles and environmental conditions can contaminate urban honey with heavy metals. These claims were challenged by some research centers that did not find significantly elevated levels of heavy metals in urban honey samples.

Local and international conferences and seminars about urban beekeeping are being held in the city. İstanbul has also hosted the 45th edition of Apimondia, the International Federation of Beekeepers' Associations, in 2017 and again in 2022.

=== Africa ===
==== Johannesburg ====
Johannesburg has over six million trees. This environment is ideal for urban beekeepers, who often have higher honey yields per hive than other Highveld beekeepers. In South Africa, anyone who handles bees must be registered as a beekeeper with the Department of Agriculture, Forestry and Fisheries.

=== Asia ===
==== Seoul ====
Beekeeping in Seoul began to gain widespread recognition in 2012 with the installation of five beehives on the rooftop of Seoul City Hall. Despite initial challenges such as public fear of swarming bees and concerns over urban honey safety, the practice has expanded steadily due to a shared belief in its benefits for urban ecosystem conservation. Beehives are maintained at many sites such as Seoul National University, Porsche Korea, Hilton Seoul Pangyo, and the National Assembly Library.

Urban Bees Seoul, as a pioneer in the urban beekeeping movement, provides education for beginners and participates in social activities related to bees.

In a move to protect bees and promote a healthier urban environment, the Seoul Metropolitan Government has banned the use of neonicotinoid pesticides in parks and on roadside trees, replacing them with eco-friendly pest control methods.

=== Other cities ===
Urban beekeeping exists in many major cities and has been reported in: Berlin, Hamburg, Hong Kong, Bengaluru (Bangalore), Melbourne, Sydney, and Tokyo.

== See also ==
- I Have a Bee
