= Michael S. Thompson =

- Born: 1948 (age 77–78); Springfield, Missouri
- Occupation: Urban beekeeper
- Organization: Chicago Honey Co-op
- Title: Director

Michael S. Thompson is a beekeeper in Chicago.

Thompson was a contributor to Thing Magazine in the early 1990s.

Thompson grew up in Wichita, Kansas and became a bee-keeper when he was 12 years old, after his parents bought him a beehive. He moved to Chicago in 1968, and began beekeeping there in 1974. In 1975, he put a beehive on his roof in Chicago and was surprised at the amount of honey his urban beekeeping produced.

In the summer of 2004, Thompson worked with two other beekeepers to start the Chicago Honey Co-op, which is dedicated to provide healthy food, passing down bee-keeping knowledge, and employing the formerly incarcerated.

In January 2013, Thompson held his first urban beekeeping class that was open to the public at the Jane Addams Hull-House Museum.
