= Honey flow =

Term used in beekeeping

Honey flow and nectar flow are terms used by beekeepers indicating that one or more major nectar sources are in bloom and the weather is favorable for bees to fly and collect the nectar in abundance.

The higher northern and southern latitudes with their longer summer day time hours can be of considerable benefit for honey production. Flowers bloom for longer hours and the time per day that bees can fly is extended, so the number of trips per day is higher. In addition, the higher latitudes do not have hot and dry periods in the summer where virtually all of the excess nectar flow dries up.

Where there are a succession of nectar sources throughout the summer season, a honeyflow may last for many weeks. In other areas significant honeyflows may only last two or three weeks per year from one or a limited number of nectar sources. The rest of the year is spent in just maintenance – a situation where the incoming nectar and pollen nearly match the needed food for the hive, or where sufficient reserve stores must be present for the hive to survive a winter season.

== Speed of work ==
Honeybees visit up to about 40 flowers per minute depending on floral type, nectar availability and weather conditions. Floral visitation rate by honeybees of some important crops:

Flower	Seconds per visit
Apricot	10
Apple	68
Cherry	82
Raspberry	116
Black currant	134

The longer the time period, the greater the nectar availability. It takes twice as much time to collect a load of nectar compared with a load of pollen. A bee will visit 100–1000 flowers per trip from the hive.

There is general agreement that a single bee will do an average of 10 trips per day (range 7–13). Large single loads of nectar may weigh 70 mg (1 grain) for Italian bees. Sometimes a hive may gain 4–10 kg (9 to 22 lb) in a single day. For a 5 kg (11 pounds) gain this means:

$7000 \text{ forager bees} \times \frac{10 \text{ trips in good flying weather}}{\text{ per day}} \times \frac{70 \text{ mg of nectar during honey flow}}{\text{per trip and bee}} \times \frac{1\text{ kg}}{1,000,000\text{ mg}} \approx 5 \text{ kg/day}$

In two days a strong hive with more than 20,000 foragers may fill a honey super. This is for nectar, ripe honey has its water fraction reduced significantly.

== See also ==
- Honey
- Honeydew source
- Northern Nectar Sources for Honeybees

== Sources ==
- The hive and the honey bee, Chapter VII by Norman E. Gary "Activities and behavior of honey bees", Dadant, Hamilton, IL 1975
- Apiary Factsheet #111, Government of British Columbia, Ministry of Agriculture and Lands, Feb 2003; accessed Mar 2006
