= Bee brood =

Chamber of a beehive

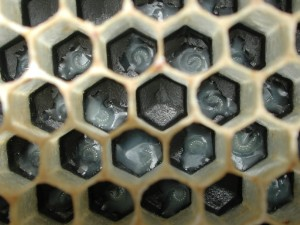
Recently hatched honey bee larvae are feeding on royal jelly for three days. Only larvae selected to become queens are fed the jelly longer than three days.

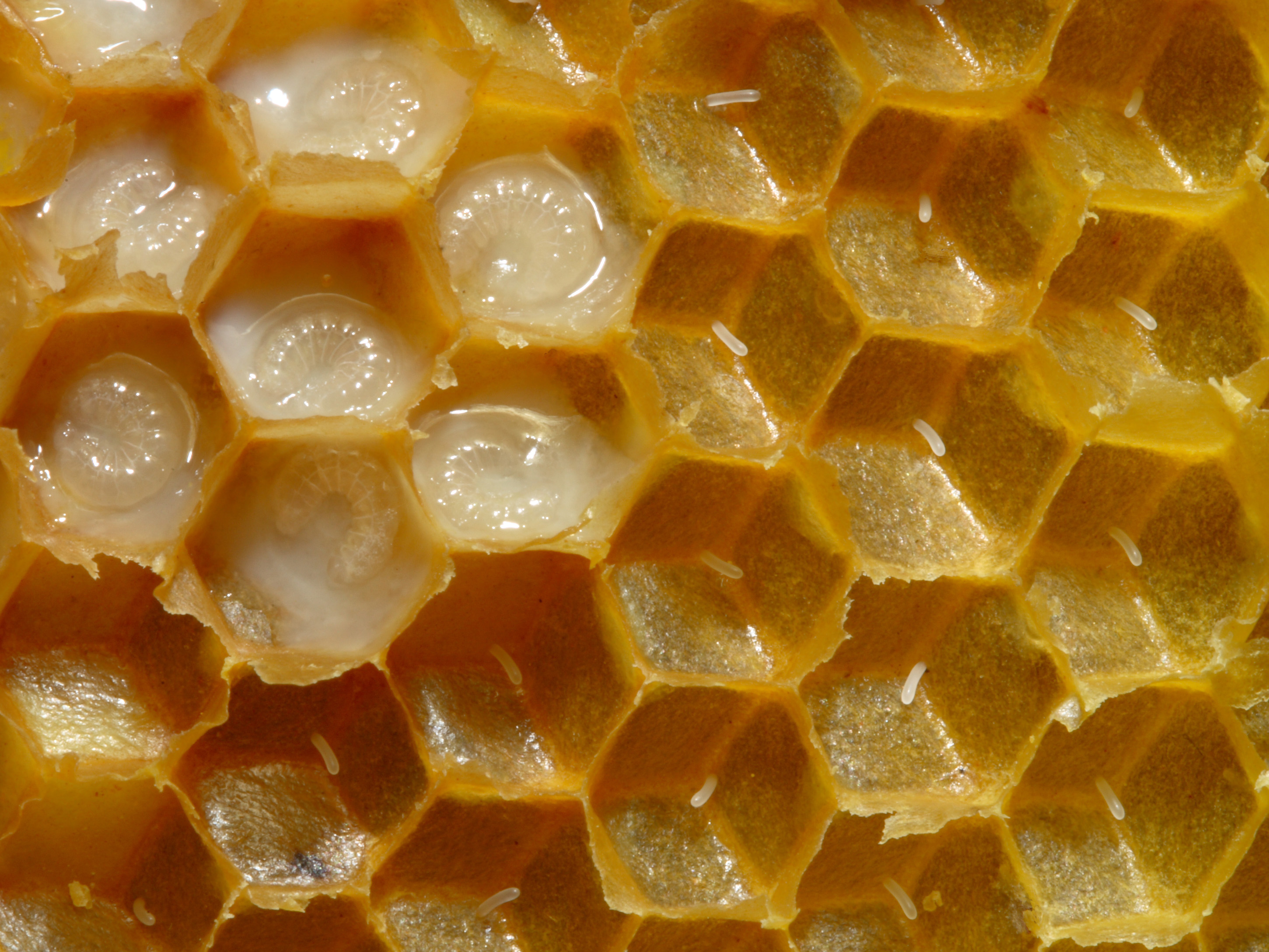
Eggs and larvae (brood cell walls partially cut away)

In beekeeping, bee brood or brood refers to the eggs, larvae and pupae of honeybees. The brood of Western honey bees develops within a bee hive. In man-made, removable frame hives, such as Langstroth hives, each frame which is mainly occupied by brood is called a brood frame. Brood frames usually have some pollen and nectar or honey in the upper corners of the frame. The rest of the brood frame cells may be empty or occupied by brood in various developmental stages. During the brood raising season, the bees may reuse the cells from which brood has emerged for additional brood or convert it to honey or pollen storage. Bees show remarkable flexibility in adapting cells to a use best suited for the hive's survival.

== Brood chamber development ==
In modern removable frame hives the nursery area is in the brood chamber, which beekeepers prefer to be in the bottom box. In the late winter and early spring as the brood cycle begins, the queen starts to lay eggs within the winter cluster in proximity to available honey stores. Honey bees tend to greatly expand the brood chamber as the season progresses. The relative location of the brood chamber within the beehive may also change as bee keepers add more boxes or as wild bees build fresh comb into available cavities. Some beekeepers ensure that the queen will not go into the upper boxes (called supers or honey supers) by placing a screen called a queen excluder between the boxes. The screen has precisely measured open spaces through which a worker bee can pass, but not a queen. Some beekeepers do not use excluders, but try to keep the queen within the intended brood area by keeping a honey barrier of capped honey, which the queen is reluctant to cross, above the brood. In feral hives the honey bees tend to put the brood at bottom center of the cavity, and honey to the sides and above the brood, so beekeepers are trying to follow the natural tendency of the bees.

In the mid to late spring, just before a bee hive would naturally split by swarming, beekeepers often remove frames of brood, with adhering bees, to make up new starter hives, called "nucs" or nucleus colonies. In areas where the climate is mild, one frame may be sufficient to start a new colony, with an added queen. But usually two to three frames are used, together with a frame that is predominantly honey. This ensures that there will be enough adult bees to provide the brood the adequate temperature and sufficient feed if there are a few rainy days when bees cannot gather nectar. If there are not enough adult bees to warm the combs, the brood may die from cold temperatures overnight (aptly called "chilled brood").

== Brood development ==
Bee brood frames are composed of brood at various stages of development - eggs, larvae, and pupae. In each cell of honeycomb, the queen lays an egg, gluing it to the bottom of the cell. The queen tends to lay brood in a circular or oval pattern. At the height of the brood laying season, the queen may lay so many eggs per day, that the brood on a particular frame may be virtually of the same age.

As the egg hatches, worker bees add royal jelly - a secretion from glands on the heads of young bees. For three days the young larvae are fed royal jelly, then they are fed nectar or diluted honey and pollen. A few female larvae in special queen cups may be selected to become queens. Their special queen cups are flooded with royal jelly for six days. The extra royal jelly speeds up the queen larvae development. Only the queen will have fully developed ovaries, i.e. she will be sexually mature. Drone brood develops from unfertilized eggs. Drone brood cells are larger than the cells of female worker bees.

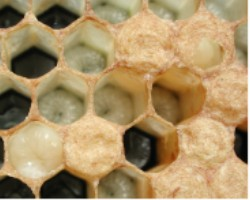
Older larvae in open cells. On the lower left is one about to pupate. On the upper right is one partly capped.

Young larvae eat their way through the royal jelly in a circular pattern until they become crowded, then they stretch out lengthwise in the cell. Soon they begin to spin a cocoon, and their older sisters cap the cell as they go into the pupal stage. These cells collectively are called "capped brood."

Type	Egg	Larva	Cell capped	Pupa	Emergence	Start of Fertility
Queen	until day 3	until day 5½	until day 7½	until day 8	from day 16 on	approx. 23rd day
Worker	until day 3	until day 6	until day 9	until day 12	from day 21 on	N/A
Drone	until day 3	until day 6½	until day 10	until day 14½	from day 24 on	approx. 38th day

== Rating brood ==
Hives that are rated for pollination purposes are generally evaluated in terms of the number of frames of brood.

== As food ==
Bee brood is harvested by beekeepers in many countries. In particular, the pupae are the highest in protein when compared to the eggs and larvae, and have protein content equivalent to that of beef or poultry. Brood is rich in carbohydrates, dietary minerals, B vitamins, vitamin C, vitamin D, saturated fat, monounsaturated fatty acids and polyunsaturated fatty acids.
