= Queen excluder =

Beekeeping equipment

Queen Excluder
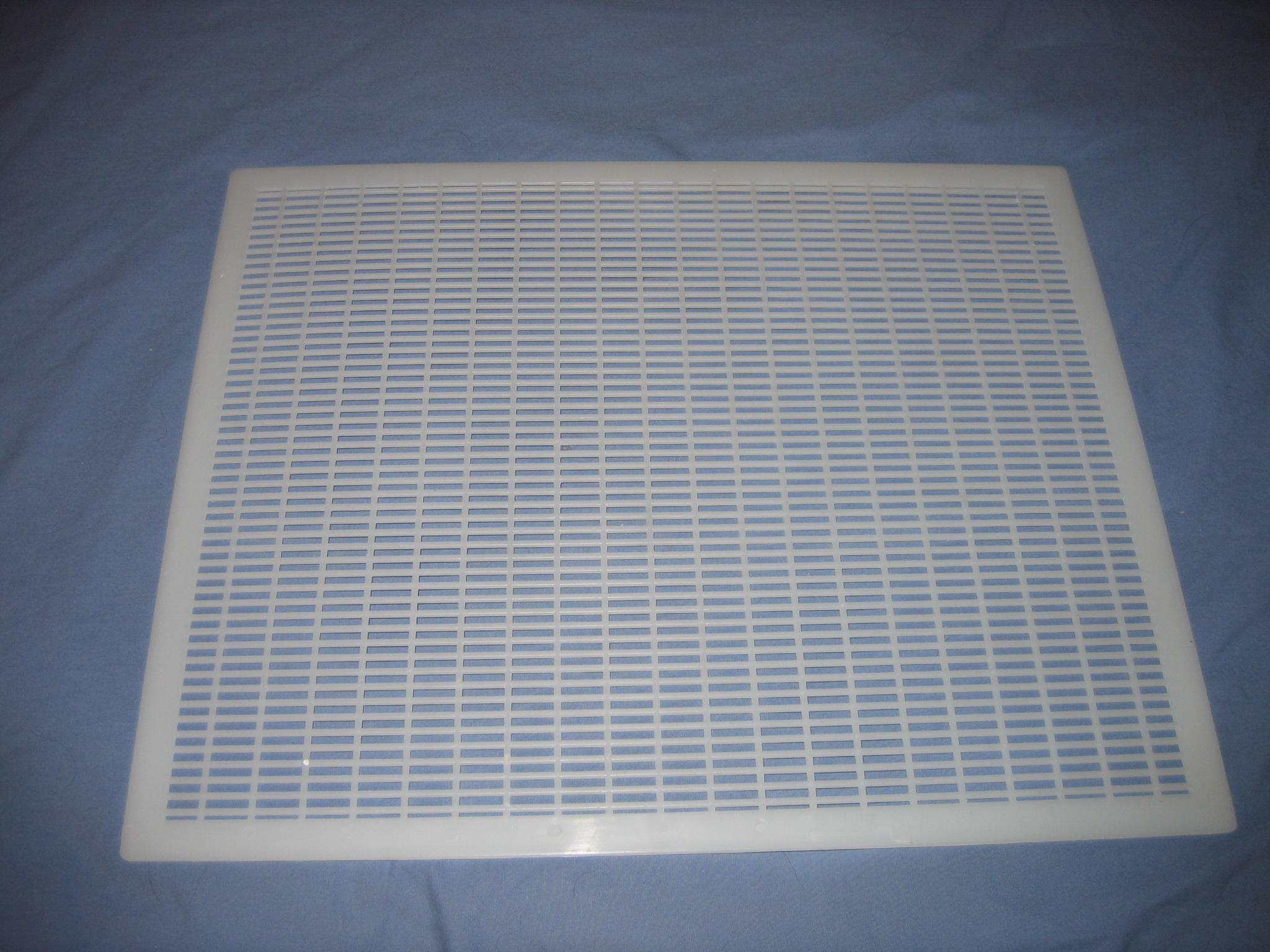
- A queen excluder
- Classification: Beekeeping
- Used with: Langstroth hive
- Inventor: Petro Prokopovych
- Manufacturer: various

In beekeeping, a queen excluder is a selective barrier inside the beehive that allows worker bees but not the larger queens and drones to traverse the barrier. The bars have a distance of 4.2 millimeters (1/6 inch). The barrier grid was probably invented around 1890.

The purpose is to prevent the queen from moving from the brood chamber to the honey chamber. There she would lay her eggs between storage cells with honey, so that bee larvae or eggs would get into the honey during centrifuging.

Queen excluders are also used with some queen breeding methods.

== Design ==
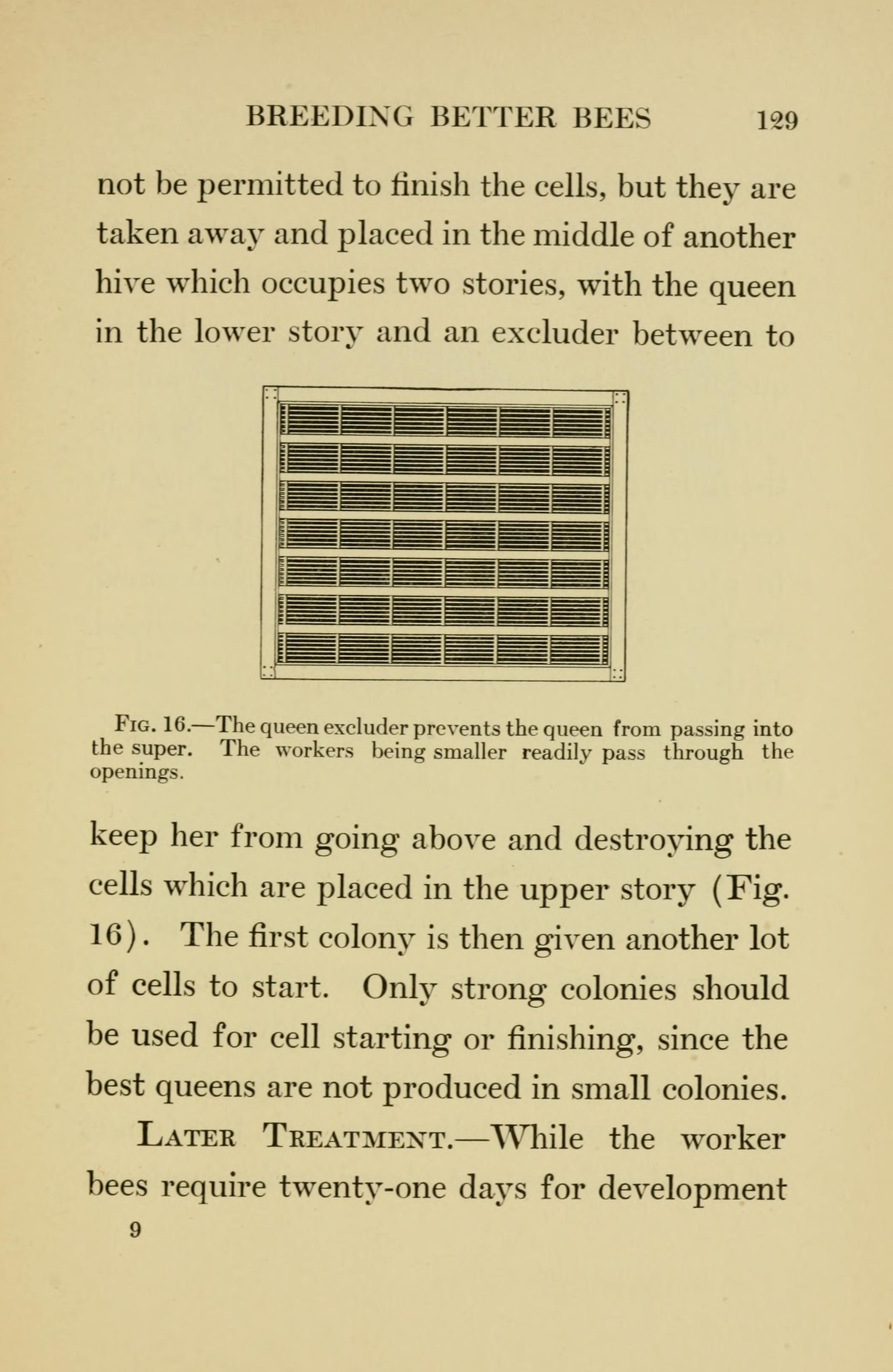
Depiction of a queen excluder, Beginner's bee book by Frank C. Pellett, 1919

Typically, the queen excluder is either a sheet of perforated metal or plastic or a wire grid in a frame with openings are limited to 0.163 inches (4.1 mm). Queen excluders can also be constructed of hardware cloth screen, of which #5 hardware cloth is often cited in references as sufficient for allowing worker bees to pass, but not queens.

== Purpose ==
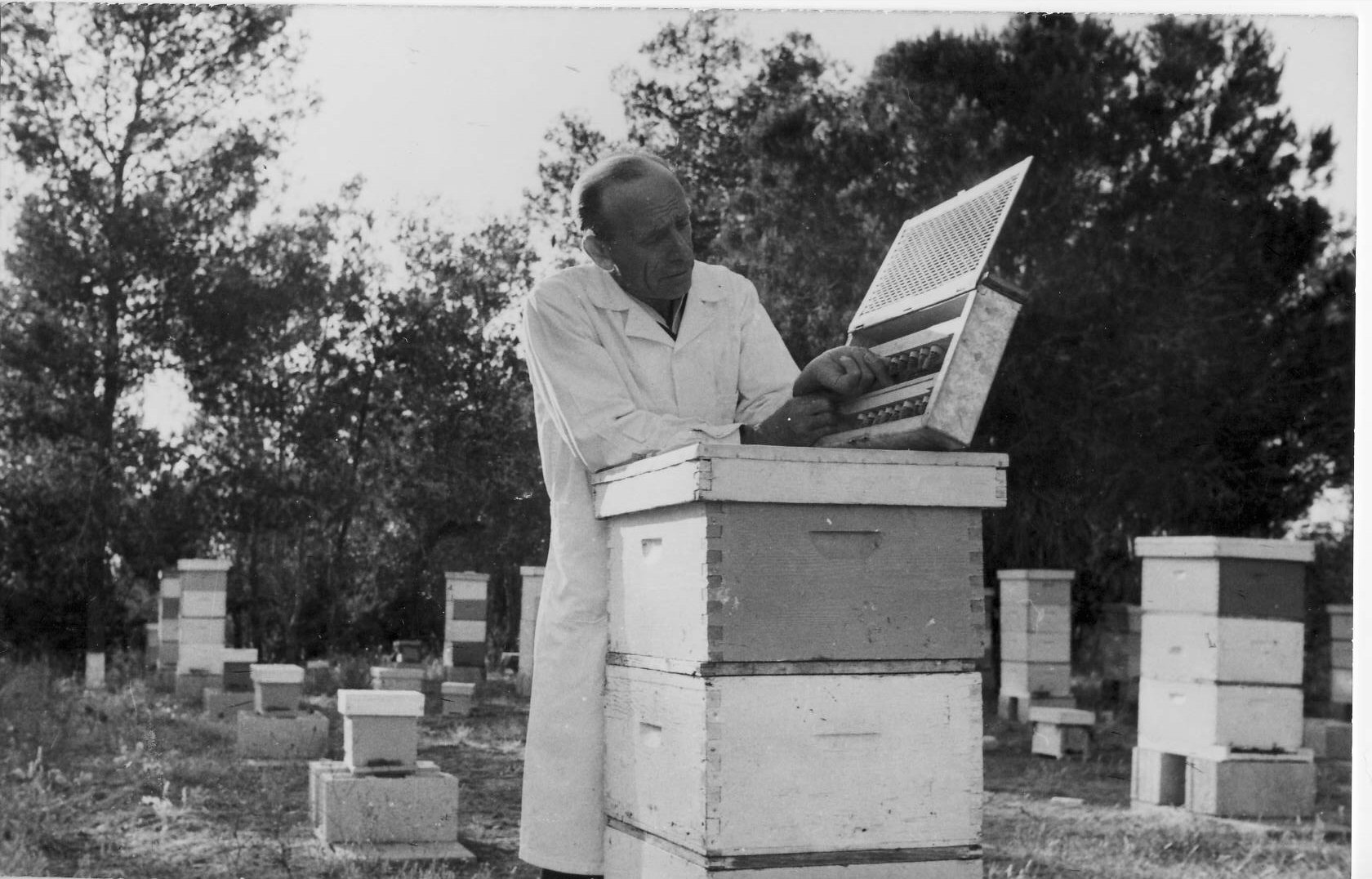
I. Ferman rearing queens using excluders, Mikveh Israel apiary, 1964

The intent of the queen excluder is to limit the queen's access to the honey supers. If the queen lays eggs in the honey supers and a brood develops in them, it is difficult to harvest clean honey. It makes fall management more difficult. Queen excluders are removed in the autumn; otherwise, the queen would not be able to move with the winter cluster and would die from exposure. A replacement queen can be difficult to introduce because the bees will not be accustomed to the new queen's pheromones. New queens can be killed by the hive. Therefore, the death of a queen in winter is dangerous for a hive and can be expensive for a beekeeper.

Queen excluders are used with some queen breeding methods, especially as a way to allow queen cells to be built in the same hive with an existing queen, or as a way to house multiple queens in the same hive.

== Reception ==
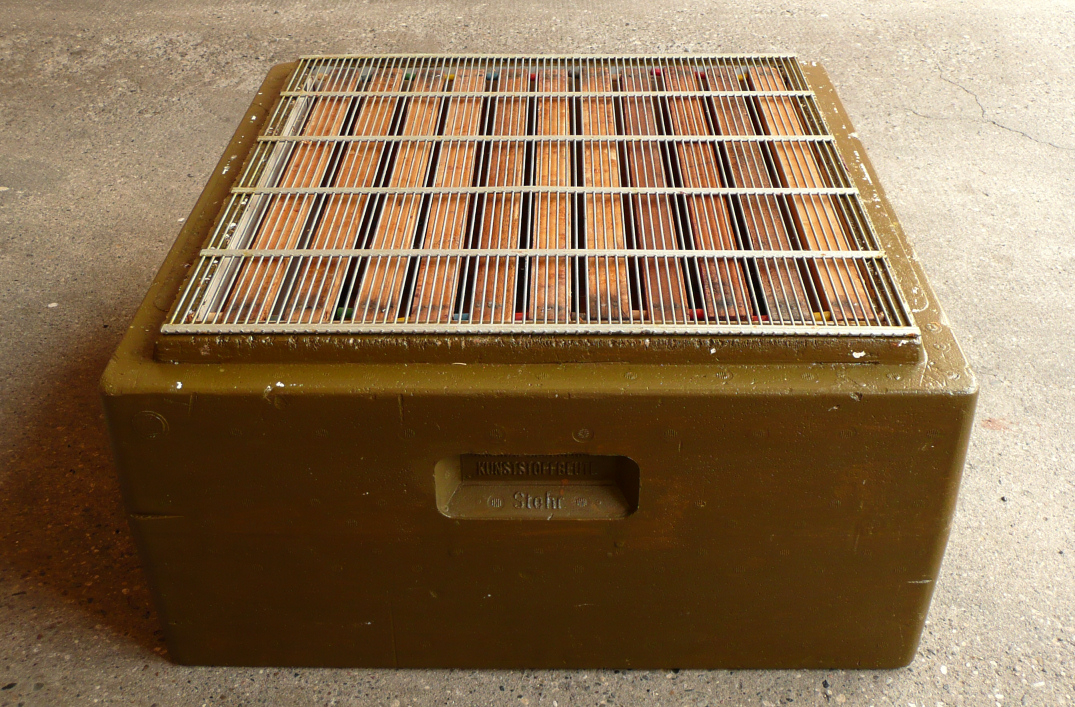
Metal queen excluder on top of a brood box

Opponents of the use of queen excluders claim that excluders lower honey quality, influence colony dynamics, and alter labour dynamics. A 2024 study found that queen excluders had no effect on colony dynamics, and did not reduce honey yield nor the amount of brood produced. Studies on honey quality and labour dynamics are ongoing.
