= Honey super =

Part of a commercial beehive used to collect honey

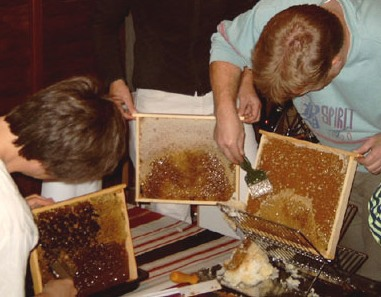
Beeswax being scraped off the honeycombs in the honey supers

A honey super is a part of a commercial or other human-managed beehive that is used to collect honey. The most common variety is the "Illinois" or "medium" super with a depth of 6 5/8 inches, in the length and width dimensions of a Langstroth hive.

A honey super consists of a box in which 8–10 frames are hung. Western honeybees collect nectar and store the processed nectar in honeycomb, which they build on the frames. When the honeycomb is full, the bees will reduce the moisture content of the honey to 17-18% moisture content before capping the comb with beeswax.

Beekeepers will take the full honey supers and extract the honey. Periods when there is an abundant nectar source available and bees are quickly bringing back the nectar, are called a honey flow. During a honey flow, beekeepers may put several honey supers onto a hive so the bees have enough storage space.

Honey supers are removed in the fall when the honey is extracted, and before the hive is winterized, but enough honey is left for the bees to consume during winter.

The queen is kept out of the super with a queen excluder, a device that lets worker bees through, but through which she is too big to pass. This prevents her from laying eggs (thus producing brood comb) in the super. The area of lower levels in which she is allowed to lay eggs is called the brood box. A brood box is similar to a super but tends to be deeper (taller).

== Langstroth hive dimensions ==
Using 3/4 inch wood the outside dimensions are 19 7/8" × 16 1/4" × height. In the metric system 25mm wood may be used, which makes the outside dimensions 515mm × 425mm × height.

Size or type	Inside (18 3/8" × 14 5/8") and height in inches	Metric 465 × 375 and height in millimeters	Comment
10 frame Comb Honey Super	4 3/4	121	Ross Rounds need 4 1/2" Super
10 frame Shallow Super	5 3/4	146	
10 frame Medium depth Illinois Super	6 5/8	168	
10 frame Large depth Super	7 5/8	193	
10 frame Deep	9 5/8	244	
