= Brood comb =

Structure in beehives

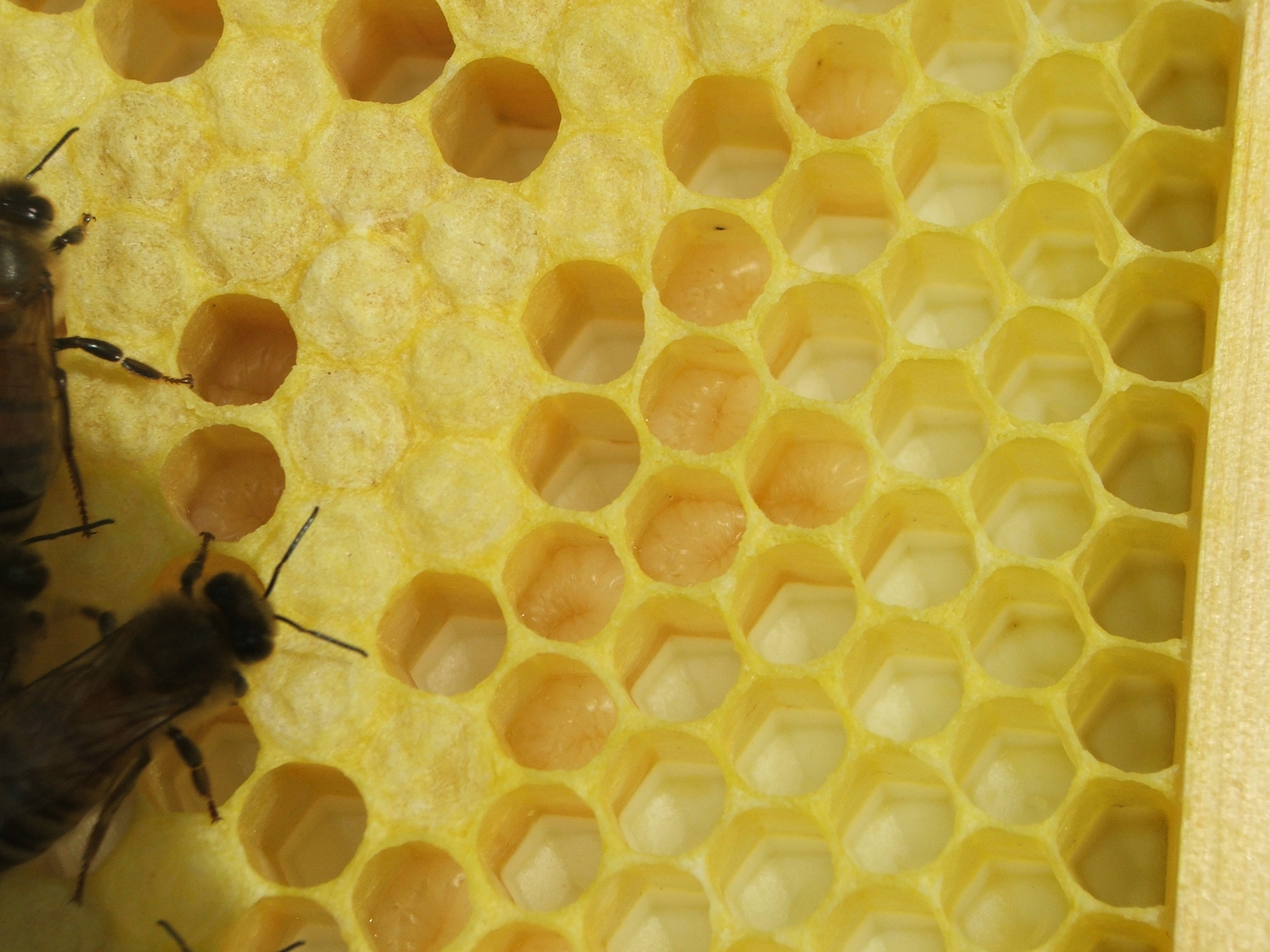
Fresh brood comb with capped brood and larva

The brood comb is the beeswax structure of cells where the queen bee lays eggs. It is the part of the beehive where a new brood is raised by the colony. During the summer season, a typical queen may lay 1500-2000 eggs per day, which results in 1500-2000 bees hatching after the three-week development period.

The brood comb is usually found in the lower part of the beehive, while the honeycomb may surround the brood area and is found exclusively in the honey supers. When a queen does not have enough brood comb to lay eggs, usually due to congestion from pollen or honey, the bee colony may be more prone to swarm.

== Size ==
The hexagonal prismatic cells for the brood comb vary in size. The diameter ranges between less than 4.6 millimetres (0.18 in) to greater than 6 millimetres (0.24 in). Drone bees require the largest cell size. There is some evidence that suggests that a smaller cell enables faster development time from egg to a fully developed, adult bee.

== Appearance ==
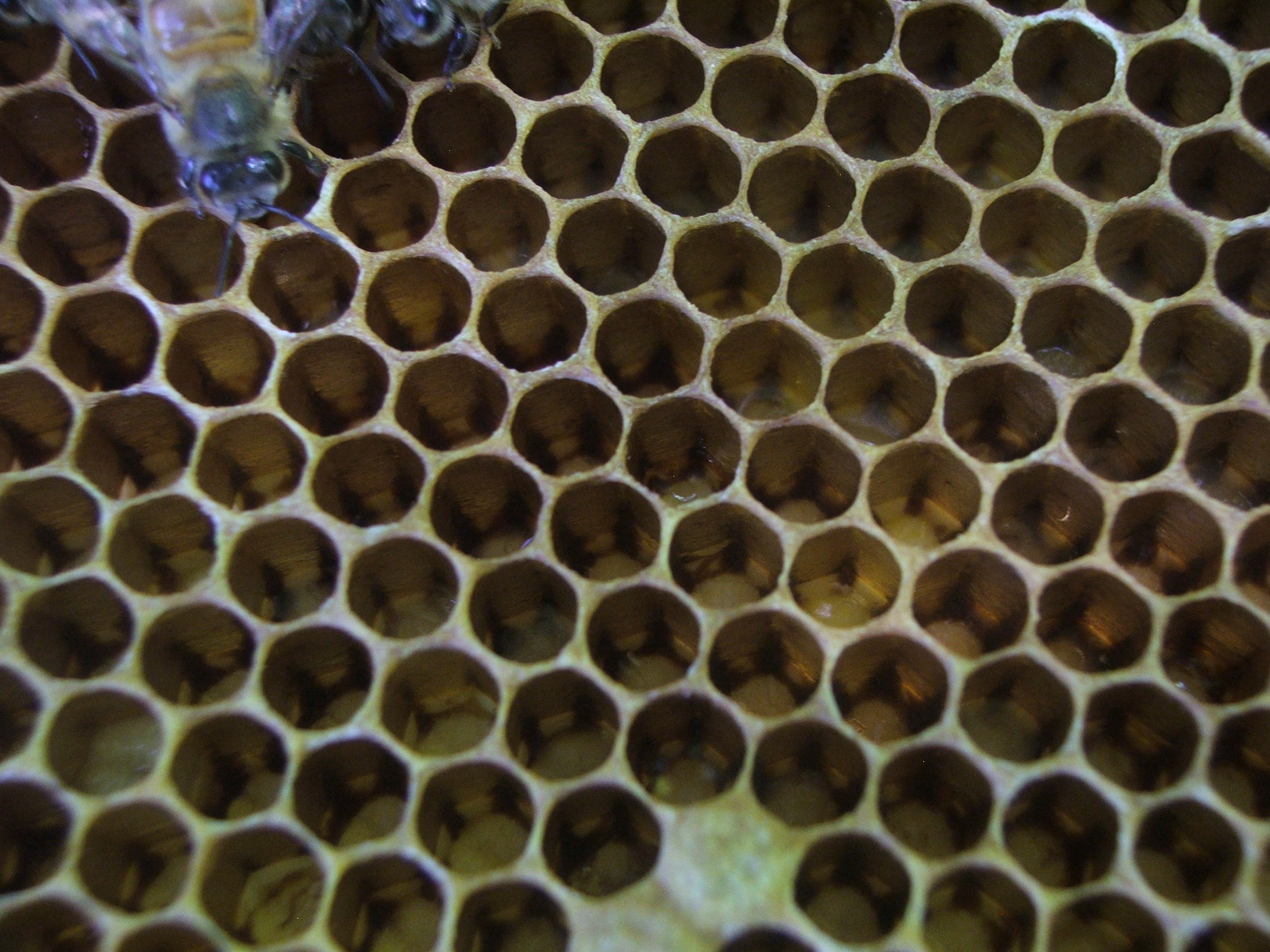
Older Darker Brood Comb (≈4 months old)

Honeycomb and brood comb have two sides. The vertex where three cells meet on one side is in the center of a cell on the other side.

Freshly created beeswax comb may appear white at first. After the first generation of bees hatch from the brood comb it becomes yellow and darker in color (Comb that is exclusively used for honey comb appears lighter). Brood comb that is used for subsequent generations of bee brood becomes darker and darker until it almost appears black. The cocoon sticks to the hexagonal walls of the cell and is not removed. The change in broodcomb color is due to the cocoon that remains inside the cell and also small soil and pollen particles that are tracked in by the bees over time.

== Queen cells ==
Queen bees are not raised in the hexagonal brood comb but require a special queen cell.

== See also ==
- Swarming (honey bee)
