= Feeder (beekeeping) =

Feeding vessel used in beekeeping

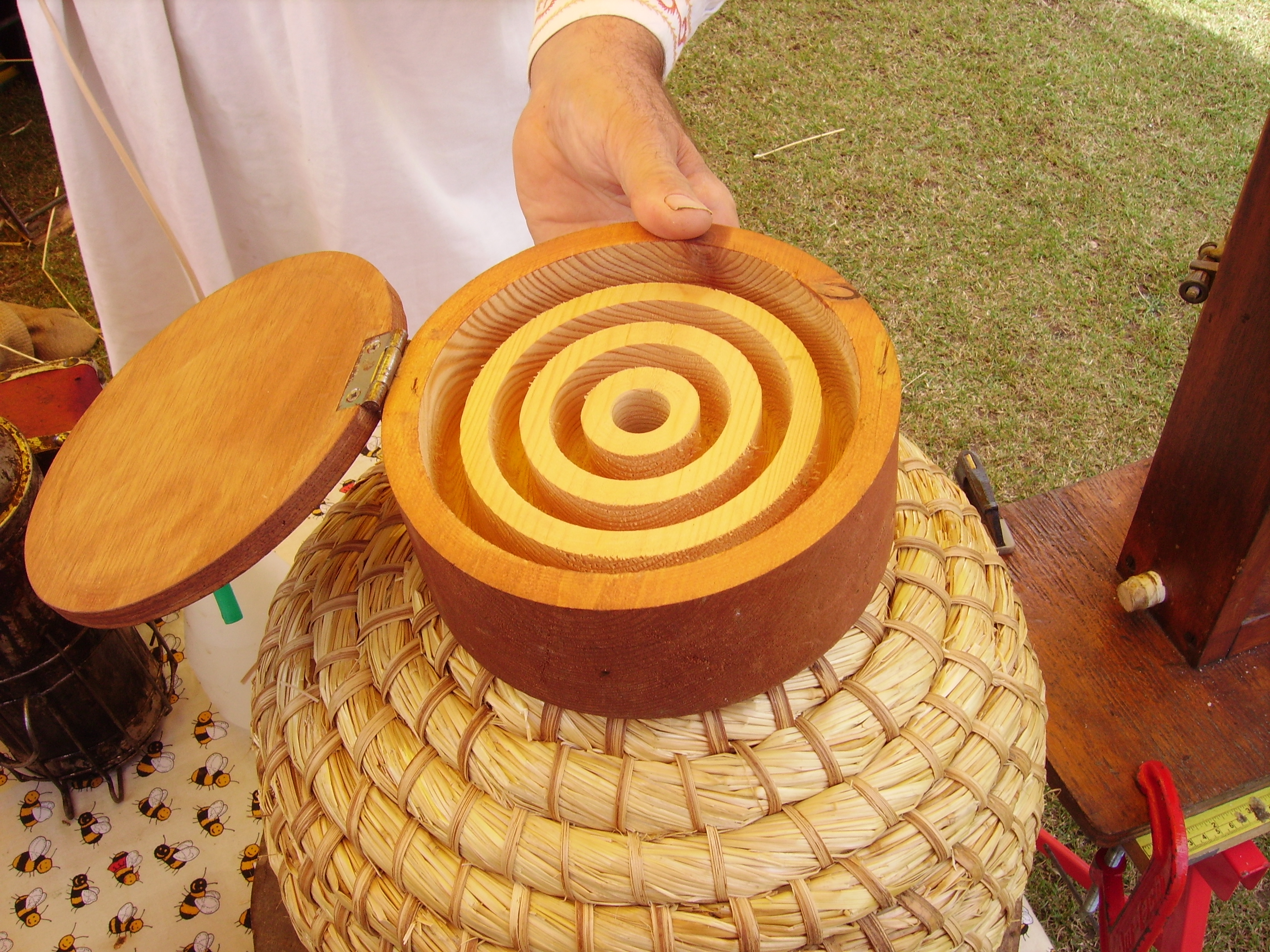
A bee feeder being demonstrated on top of a hive at the Bedfordshire Beekeepers Association stall at the Living History event at Priory Country Park. (photo: Simon Speed)

A feeder is a vessel or contraption used by beekeepers to feed pollen or honey (or substitutes) to honey bees from a honey bee colony.

Beekeepers feed bees when there is a shortage of those resources in nature, or when beekeepers want to mimic an abundance of those resources to encourage bees to behave in a certain manner. Modern beekeepers feed sugar syrup as a honey substitute in early spring to encourage comb building, during a dearth to provide energy to large colonies, in the autumn to help bees prepare for overwintering, or when creating nucleus hives. Pollen substitute is commonly fed to bees in early spring or when bees are located in a region with poor pollen resources.

Feeders may exist outside the hive, be designed to fit certain hive designs, be an integral part of a hive design, or be used separately inside the hive. Feeders may attach to the side of the hive, or slot into the flight entrance, or placed above or below the nest inside the hive or as a purpose-built hive component.

== Pollen feeder ==
Pollen can be fed from outside or inside the hive. When pollen or a pollen supplement is fed it can be fed as a powder, granules or in patty form. Pollen feeders are usually used at the beginning of the brood rearing season.

== Syrup feeder ==
Sugary syrup, which can be HFCS or dissolved table sugar, can be fed from outside the hive or inside the hive. When syrup is fed outside the hive the usual arrangement is a 5gal bucket filled with syrup and a floating perch. In the absence of a float, many bees will drown in the sugary solution. Inside the hive, syrup feeders are either hanging like frames or put on top of the hive, so called hive-top feeders. Hive-top feeders can be specially designed hive boxes or an inverted bucket with a screened hole. Syrup feeders with a 2:1 concentration of water and sugar by weight are typically used in the fall after the last honey is removed. At the beginning of the brood rearing season in the late winter or spring a 1:1 concentration of water and sugar is typically used.

== Use and disuse ==
The use of feeders by the bees stops when it either gets too cold or the bees collect other food sources. To avoid contaminating honey with sugar syrup, bees should not be fed syrup when the honey supers are on.

== See also ==
- Northern Nectar Sources for Honey Bees
- Nectar source
- Honeydew source
- Pollen source
- List of honey plants
