= Central Science Laboratory =

Former executive agency in the UK

Central Science Laboratory.

The Central Science Laboratory (CSL) was formed in 1992 as an executive agency of the UK government branch, the Ministry of Agriculture Fisheries and Food (MAFF). It survived the renaming of MAFF into an Executive Agency of the Department for Environment, Food and Rural Affairs (Defra) in 2001, before becoming the Food and Environment Research Agency in 2009, which was also part of Defra.

It specialises in sciences which form the basis of agriculture for sustainable crop production, environmental management and conservation and in food safety and quality. It also houses FAPAS and the National Collection of Plant Pathogenic Bacteria.

The Central Science laboratory (CSL) was the UK's foremost public sector laboratory in the fields of agriculture, food and the environment. As an Executive Agency of the Department for Environment, Food and Rural Affairs (Defra), CSL was responsible for the delivery of science in support of Government objectives.

Officially launched in 1992 CSL's scientific expertise dates back to 1914, through the bringing together scientific expertise vested in a number of other scientific laboratories.

A new facility at Sand Hutton was completed in 1996 for 134 million pounds the moving of the Aberdeen and Norwich facilities to the Sand Hutton site was not part of the initial centralization plan but was subsequently carried out. The site is now the home of The Food and Environment Research Agency.

== Facilities ==
=== Slough, Tolworth, Worplesdon Laboratories ===
In 1929 the Hurworth Estate, Slough - consisting of a moderate-sized house and out-buildings, with adjoining land - was purchased by the Imperial College of Science and Technology for use as a biological field station. The grounds were used by the Botany Department for growing experimental crops and the main house by the Department of Zoology and Entomology and the Department of Agricultural Chemistry as a base for investigations into the biology and control of insect pests of cargoes of cacao and dried fruit stored in warehouses in London.

In 1938 concern over the Government's strategic storage of grain and flour led to a survey of pests of stored commodities. The survey revealed the need for long-term research and in 1940 the Department of Scientific and Industrial Research, which was responsible for the bulk of government-financed research on food, set up the Pest Infestation Laboratory on the Slough site. Research initially focused on protecting the security of foodstuffs held under wartime conditions.

At this time the Ministry of Agriculture and Fisheries (MAF) set up the Infestation Control Laboratory at a site in Tolworth, Greater London, to carry out R&D into food losses to rodents. The research programme of the laboratory was extended in 1958 with an additional field station in Worplesdon, Surrey, set up to undertake research into problems in the field caused by birds and mammals other than rodents.

Responsibility for the Pest Infestation Laboratory at Slough passed to the Agricultural Research Council in 1959 and in 1970 the laboratory was again transferred, this time to The Ministry of Agriculture, Fisheries and Food (MAFF). Following the transfer, the Pest Infestation Laboratory was amalgamated with the Infestation Control Laboratory at Tolworth and Worplesdon. The newly merged laboratories were renamed the Pest Infestation Control Laboratory.

In 1971 management of the laboratory was transferred to the Agricultural Development and Advisory Service (ADAS) a new division within MAFF set up to bring together MAFF's professional, technical and scientific services.

In the mid-1970s the Pest Infestation Control Laboratory set up additional field stations in Gloucestershire and Hampshire. Field based research and ecology studies continued at these outstations until transfer to The Food and Environment Research Agency.

=== Harpenden Laboratory ===
In 1914 the Institute for Plant Pathology was set up at the Royal Botanic Gardens, Kew, in response to the growing problem of new pests and diseases being brought into the country on plants collected during international expeditions. Food shortages of World War I, and the realisation that production would need to be increased after the War, stimulated the Food Production Department in 1917 to start an intelligence and survey service on plant pests and diseases.

A re-organisation of the Institute in 1918 resulted in the formation of the Plant Pathology Laboratory. The new laboratory took over the institute's intelligence and survey function and also advised the Minister on the steps needed to prevent both the introduction of destructive new pests and diseases and the further spread of dangerous ones that had already gained a foothold in the country.

In 1920 the Plant Pathology Laboratory moved from Kew to a converted private house in Harpenden, Hertfordshire. In 1960 the work of the laboratory had expanded significantly and it relocated to a new purpose-built complex in Harpenden. The new site – in total approximately 5 acres (20,000 m^{2}) of land - included 2-3 acres of experimental plots. Work was organised over three departments - Entomology, Plant Pathology and Chemistry - and included the Pesticide Registration Department. An outstation in Cambridge also carried out research on pesticide residues.

In 1971 MAFF's professional, technical and scientific services were brought together within the newly set up Agricultural Development and Advisory Service (ADAS). Along with the Pest Infestation Control Laboratory, the Plant Pathology Laboratory now operated as a science laboratory within the Agricultural Science Service (one of five services of ADAS).

In 1979 the Plant Pathology Laboratory was renamed Harpenden Laboratory.

=== Torry Research Station ===
In 1929 the Department of Scientific and Industrial Research (DSIR) set up a research station in Torry, Aberdeen to carry out R&D into fish preservation due to growing concern surrounding the loss of thousands of tons of fish annually through decay. The Officer in Charge was George Adam Reay retitled in 1937 as Director.

World War II had a significant impact on Torry's research programme and during the 1940s the research station took on a more advisory role; developing innovative ways to use underutilized fish and making cheaper cuts of fish more palatable to make rations go further. In 1952 Torry set up a branch laboratory - The Humber Laboratory, Hull - providing valuable contact with the regional fishing industry and undertaking complementary research to Torry such as R&D on the fish smoking process, the quality of frozen fish products and the handling of shellfish.

In 1953, the Torry freshness scale for assessment of fish was developed at the research station.

1965 saw responsibility for Torry transfer from DSIR to the Ministry of Technology. When the Ministry ceased to exist in 1970 Torry transferred to the Department of Trade and Industry (DTI). Another transfer of responsibility occurred in 1972 when Torry moved from DTI to MAFF.

Finally, in 1990, Torry Research Station was transferred to the Food Safety Directorate within MAFF working alongside Norwich Food Science Laboratory.

=== Norwich Food Science Laboratory ===
In the early 20th Century, war forced the UK Government into strategic planning on avoiding food shortages. Throughout the UK emergency stockpiles of food were gathered in secret locations known as 'Buffer Depots'.

The Food Science Laboratory was set up in Great Westminster House - one of the main London headquarters of the then Ministry of Food - with a team of scientists responsible for checking the specifications of the foodstuffs entering the stockpiles (e.g. ensuring that the protein content of the flour was high enough for bread making purposes), and monitoring the quality of existing stocks by looking for signs of deterioration during storage.

In 1977 the laboratory moved from Great Westminster House, across the road to Romney Street. The new laboratory was located on the 7th floor of the building occupied by the Horseferry Road Magistrates' Court, where it remained until the end of January 1990, before moving to the new purpose-built laboratory in Colney Lane, Norwich.

In addition to the London site, the Ministry had an outstation in Norwich, which also monitored the quality of the stockpiles and undertook research into the reactions of food additives.

The laboratories - although separate - all operated within the Ministry's Food Standards, Science and Safety Division. The Norwich Laboratory was originally based at Bishopgate in the city but in the late 1960s moved into leased laboratories in the Institute of Food Research (IFR) buildings at Colney Lane on the outskirts of the city.

In 1978 re-organisation at IFR led to most of the laboratory's staff and work being transferred to larger premises at Haldin House in the centre of Norwich. Here, in addition to carrying out research into food additives and contaminants the laboratory began long term work on chloropropanols, dioxins, mycotoxins, migration from packaging, veterinary drug residues, trace elements and food authenticity. The laboratory's role as a skilled rapid response unit came into play when called upon to deal with crises such as contamination of cattle feed with lead, and the chemical adulteration of Austrian wine.

In 1990 the Norwich Food Science Laboratory returned to Colney Lane where it expanded links with neighbouring institutes (IFR, British Sugar Technical Centre, the John Innes Research Centre and the University of East Anglia) in the formation of the Norwich Research Park.

In 1999 the Norwich Food Science Laboratory moved to become part of CSL on the Sand Hutton site.

=== The National Bee Unit, Luddington ===
The first Government involvement into the beekeeping industry was in the 1940s when the Ministry of Agriculture and Fisheries (MAF) regulated the provision of sugar to beekeepers under wartime rationing. The first legislation applied to beekeeping was the Foul Brood Disease of Bees Order, 1942. Since then there have been several changes in legislation; the current UK law on bees is administered under the Bees Act 1980, the Bee Disease Control Order 1992 and the Importation of bees Order 1997 as well as being governed by European law.

In the 1950s the National Agricultural Advisory Service (NAAS) was responsible for bee health work. Based at Rothamsted Lodge, Harpenden, Hertfordshire, and Trawscoed in Wales, the primary remit of the bee units was disease monitoring and control of bee diseases.

In 1979 the units were amalgamated to form the Agricultural Development and Advisory Service (ADAS) National Bee Unit (NBU), located at Luddington Experimental Horticulture Station, just outside Stratford-upon-Avon. The ADAS NBU provided statutory and advisory services to MAFF and beekeepers throughout England and Wales on all aspects of apiary management and bee health as well as carrying out R&D work.

In 1991, following the privatisation of ADAS, the NBU joined CSL and in 1994 took on the responsibility of the MAFF Bee Disease Inspection Service.

== History - timeline ==
Key dates on the timeline to the formation of CSL:

=== 1988 ===
The Harpenden Laboratory and the Pest Infestation Control Laboratory, both operating within the Agricultural Science Service of the Agricultural and Development Advisory Service (ADAS) - a division of the Ministry of Agriculture, Fisheries and Food (MAFF) - come together under single management. Forerunners of CSL, the laboratories share common scientific objectives in relation to the safe and efficient production of food and the protection of the consumer and the environment.

Central Science Laboratory is officially launched still operating within ADAS.

=== 1989 ===
Two facilities were scheduled to be closed down in the near future, Rosewarne in Cornwall and Luddington in Warwickshire.

=== 1991 ===
One outcome of the Government's 'Next Steps Initiative' is the decision to privatise the advisory service of ADAS along with its research activities. CSL is identified as a candidate for Executive Agency status of MAFF and at this stage separates from ADAS. The National Bee Unit (one of the advisory services of ADAS) joins CSL.

=== 1992 ===
Official launch of CSL as an Executive Agency of MAFF.

Re-launch of CSL as an enlarged Executive Agency following merger with MAFF's Food Science Laboratories based at Norwich and Torry, Aberdeen.

=== 1996 ===
CSL relocates to Sand Hutton, with the exception of field stations in Gloucestershire and Hampshire and the food safety work undertaken at Norwich.

=== 1998 ===
Remaining staff and work at Norwich relocate to York.

=== 2001 ===
MAFF is disbanded. CSL becomes an Executive Agency of Defra.

=== 2009 ===
On 1 April 2009 Central Science Laboratory merged with Defra's Plant Health and Seeds Inspectorate, Plant Varieties and Seeds, Defra Plant Health Division and the Government Decontamination Service to form The Food and Environment Research Agency, an Executive Agency of Defra.

== See also ==
- National Bee Unit
