= National Bee Unit =

Research institute in North Yorkshire, England

National Bee Unit and BeeBase
- Established: 1950s
- Head: Mike Brown
- Faculty: FERA
- Staff: 70+
- Location: Sand Hutton, North Yorkshire, UK
- Website: BeeBase

The National Bee Unit (NBU) runs Bee Health Programmes in England and Wales. The NBU consists of around 60 field-based Bee Inspectors and staff based in Sand Hutton, North Yorkshire.

== History ==
In the 1950s, Bee Health was the responsibility of the National Agricultural Advisory Service (NAAS), with units in Harpenden and Trawsgoed. These merged in 1979 to form the National Beekeeping Unit at Luddington, Warwickshire. The NBU joined the Central Science Laboratory in 1991 and relocated to Sand Hutton, North Yorkshire in 1996, changing its name to the National Bee Unit. In 2009 the Central Science Laboratory merged with other UK Government agencies to form The Food and Environment Research Agency (FERA), which was established to support and develop a sustainable food chain and a healthy natural environment. On 1 April 2014, the Animal and Plant Health Agency (APHA), formerly known as the Animal Health and Veterinary Laboratories Agency (AHVLA), an executive agency of the Department for Environment, Food and Rural Affairs (Defra) was expanded by adding parts of the Food and Environment Research Agency (FERA). This included the National Bee Unit.

== Function ==
The unit functions on behalf of the Department for Environment, Food and Rural Affairs (as part of Animal and Plant Health Agency (APHA) and the Welsh Government) It does not cover Scotland or Northern Ireland. A programme of research and development underpins the National Bee Unit's work and feeds back through advice to the beekeeping industry and the policy divisions in England and Wales. It runs BeeBase, a website designed to help monitor and control the spread of serious honey bee pests and diseases.

== Role ==
The role of the National Bee Unit is to protect the honey bee, an essential pollinator of crops and wild plants, and to support the beekeeping industry through:

- controlling serious endemic pests and diseases to minimise the economic and environmental impact.
- advising beekeepers on the recognition and control of pests to make the industry more self-sufficient.
- minimising the risk of importation of exotic pests and diseases and managing the risks should an incursion take place.

== See also ==
- Veterinary Medicines Directorate
- Beekeeping in the United Kingdom
