= Luddington, Warwickshire =

Village in Warwickshire, England

Coordinates: 52.1700°N 1.7599°W

Luddington
- Location within Warwickshire
- Population: 475 in whole parish (2011)
- OS grid reference: SP165525
- District: Stratford-on-Avon
- Shire county: Warwickshire
- Region: West Midlands
- Country: England
- Sovereign state: United Kingdom
- Post town: Stratford-upon-Avon
- Postcode district: CV37
- Dialling code: 01789
- Police: Warwickshire
- Fire: Warwickshire
- Ambulance: West Midlands
- UK Parliament: Stratford-on-Avon

Luddington /ˈlʌdɪŋtən/ is a small village and civil parish in the English county of Warwickshire and is part of Stratford-on-Avon district. The community is a conservation area due to its historic aspects. In 2001, the population was 457, increasing to 515 at the 2021 census. It is located about 5 kilometres (3 miles) outside the town of Stratford-upon-Avon on the banks of the river Avon and has views south over the Cotswolds. Facilities and communications include a phone box, a 19th-century church, a post box, a marina with a 17th-century lock, a village green and a recently refurbished village hall originally built in 1953. The parish encompasses Dodwell Caravan Park to the north of the village. The village is reputed to be the meeting place of Anne Hathaway and William Shakespeare, as Anne was from the parish, and local lore states that they probably conducted their courtship in the area.

== Climate ==
The highest recorded temperature was 33.2 °C (91.8 °F) on 3 July 1976 and 22 July 1989 and the lowest was −20.4 °C (−4.7 °F) on 14 January 1982.

Climate data for Luddington 47m amsl (1959–1989)
Month	Jan	Feb	Mar	Apr	May	Jun	Jul	Aug	Sep	Oct	Nov	Dec	Year
Record high °C (°F)	13.7 (56.7)	17.8 (64.0)	22.2 (72.0)	22.1 (71.8)	26.7 (80.1)	32.5 (90.5)	33.2 (91.8)	33.0 (91.4)	29.4 (84.9)	27.5 (81.5)	17.2 (63.0)	15.6 (60.1)	33.2 (91.8)
Record low °C (°F)	−20.4 (−4.7)	−11.9 (10.6)	−11.7 (10.9)	−5.6 (21.9)	−2.8 (27.0)	−1.1 (30.0)	1.7 (35.1)	1.7 (35.1)	−3.3 (26.1)	−4.0 (24.8)	−8.8 (16.2)	−17.9 (−0.2)	−20.4 (−4.7)
Source: Starlings Roost Weather

== History ==
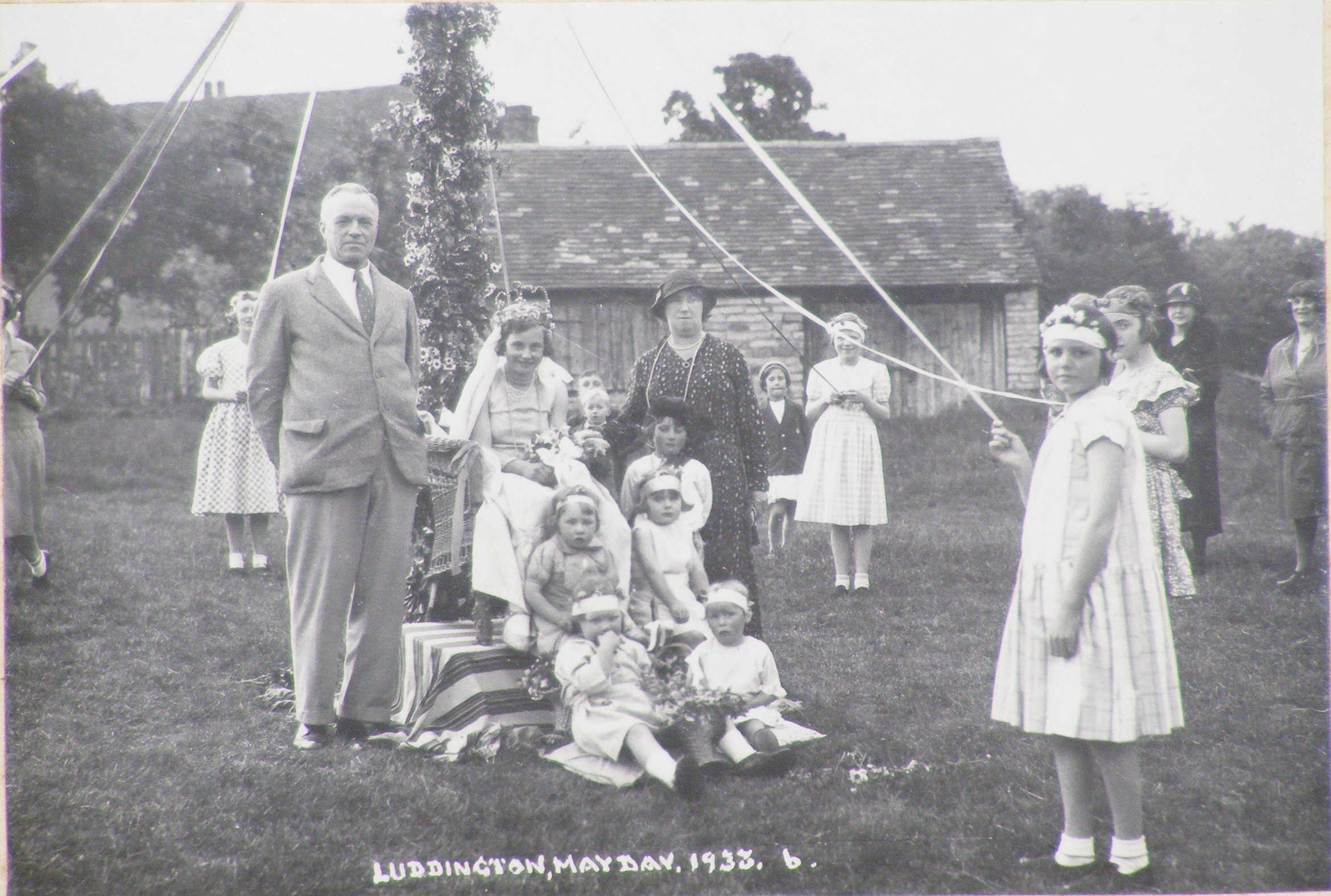
May Day, Luddington Village Green, 1933. The blacksmith's shop is in the background.

The name Luddington is of Old English origin meaning Luda's farmstead. Dodwell is also of Old English origin and means Dodda's well or spring. The Domesday Book of 1086 states that the chief tenant at that time was the Count of Meulan, Robert de Beaumont, 1st Earl of Leicester; the hamlet consisted of "20 villagers, 9 smallholders, ... 9 ploughlands ... 5 lord's plough teams. 5 men's plough teams ... meadow 42 acres". The 29 households put Luddington "in the largest 40% of settlements recorded in Domesday". In earlier centuries, the area had been occupied by the Romans who built roads and was part of Mercia from 500 to 874.

The village was originally accessed via a road running from the Evesham road down through Dodwell, then an enclosed village with a half dozen houses and later, a deserted site. This then continued through a ford in the river to Milcote. This first part of this road is now a footpath and the second part no longer exists. The settled area was previously part of the Ragley estate belonging to the Marquis of Hertford. One of the oldest building in the village is part of the Grade II listed Boddington Farm, portions of which were built circa 1600, or earlier. It marks the eastern boundary of the village's conservation area.

During the English Civil War, Robert Simcock's (Simcox) barn was emptied of its "carefully stored" apples by marauding troops. During the war, Royalist troops were billeted in the village.

Other old buildings include Clover Cottage, which is now part of a row of three cottages thought to formerly be one single-floor thatched cottage that has been split by a builder in the 20th century. Evidence of Clover Cottage dating back to before the 16th century was found during a recent (2015) renovation of the thatch in which the whole thatch was removed and replaced. Other important buildings include Sandfields Farm (now Luddington Grange) with portions from the 17th century, The Manor and The Cottage (now named The Old House) with portions from the 16th century; all three are Grade II listed.

Luddington Manor was part of the Ragley Hall Estate; some sources indicate that this was possibly the home of Anne Hathaway's family while others suggest that it was owned by relatives of the family. Lore in the area indicates that this was where playwright and poet William Shakespeare and Anne Hathaway first met. The Cottage's front garden is shown on some maps to have been the original site of All Saint's church; there is some "circumstantial evidence" that this was the site of the wedding of Shakespeare and Hathaway in 1582. The current church, Grade II listed, was built in 1871–72 on a different site and is not the one that stood in the village in Shakespeare's time; the original building had been destroyed by fire, circa 1790.

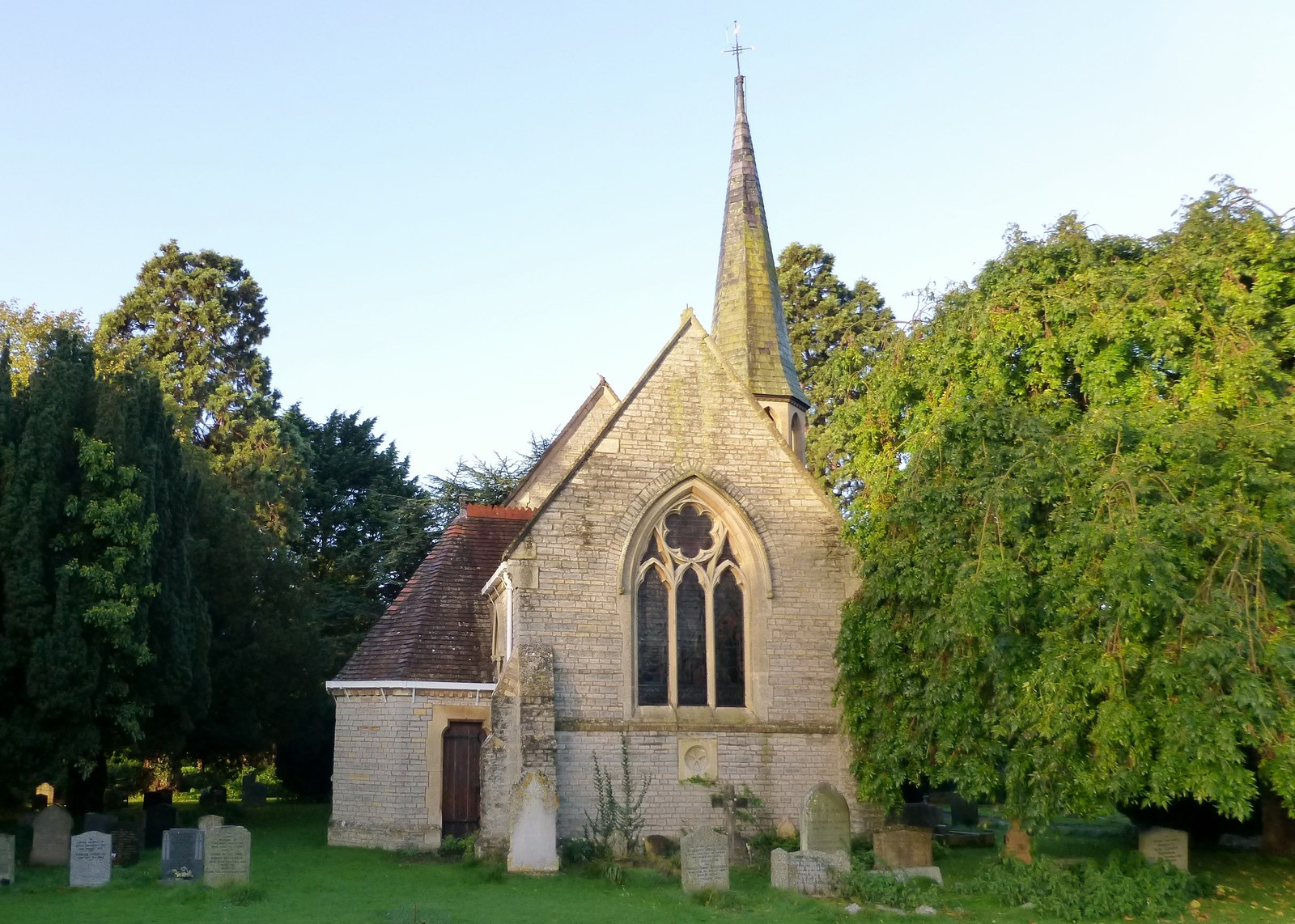
The current All Saints' Church

There are 14 Listed properties and numerous half-timbered buildings and four thatched cottages.

The former Methodist Chapel was opened in August 1932, in a farm building owned by Thomas Higginson, a local farmer and Methodist Local Preacher. Other more recent buildings have been allocated to the farm estates. The village green was given over to public (Common land) by the Marquis of Hertford of Ragley Hall at Arrow.

Luddington was home to Luddington Experimental Horticulture Station (EHS), one of several such establishments around the country undertaking field research for the Agricultural Development and Advisory Service (ADAS) of the Department for Environment, Food and Rural Affairs Defra. The facility closed down circa 1990.

== Economy ==
The community is largely a dormitory village, with the majority of the inhabitants working elsewhere. Residence and community is the main activity within the village, with surrounding farms providing some employment opportunity. Regular transient workers living on the farm are encouraged to be involved in the village and this in 2015, there was even an "international tug-o-war competition, with finalists Lithuania vs Bulgaria showing that Luddington is a truly welcome place to be.

Following the first suspected H5N1 bird flu outbreak in the United Kingdom, when a dead swan was found in Scotland, samples were sent to Luddington's now closed veterinary research facility for testing. Bomfords has frequently been at loggerheads with the village residents, who successfully took the company to court to prevent its very large goods vehicles driving through the village, resulting in a 7.5t limit on traffic and a massive reduction in the flow of vehicles. The Dodwell Trading Estate to the north of Luddington on the main Stratford-Evesham road, offers another source of employment and retail including bespoke joinery, antiques and unique homewares. Within the village, there is also a farrier and an organ building and repair business, a finance company and a healthcare/medical devices producer.

== Village life ==
The village has many events including Carols on the Green on Christmas Eve with a brass band and mulled wine. There is an annual village fête in the summer and regular social events including All Saints Arms pub nights, quiz nights, the Arts Club, annual flower show, Luddflicks (cinema evenings) and dance classes in the village hall. Other activities include fishing, boating and canoeing though there is no slipway. The route of the Stratford Marathon passes through the village and the villagers host a water station and toilet facilities at their homes and the hall. Dodwell Farm, about 1.5 miles (2.4 km) north of the village hosts occasional motocross events during the summer.

== Dodwell ==
The civil parish also includes the Dodwell caravan park about 1 mile (1.6 km) north of the village proper. The construction of this park effectively doubled the parish's population and means that the parish has two separate centres of population. Dodwell was originally a farming hamlet on the Evesham Road from Stratford to Bidford west of Bordon Hill.

== Youth ==
The young people of the parish all reside in the village proper with no children living in Dodwell. Those of school age tend to attend schools within the Stratford-on-Avon district, usually either in Stratford-upon-Avon or Alcester. There are few facilities for young people, apart from the swings on the green. There are no schools in the parish.

== Transport ==
There are limited bus services for both the village and Dodwell, but not between the two, though the walk between the two is 10 minutes and the bus can take you to within a 5-minute walk.
