= Beekeeping in the United Kingdom =

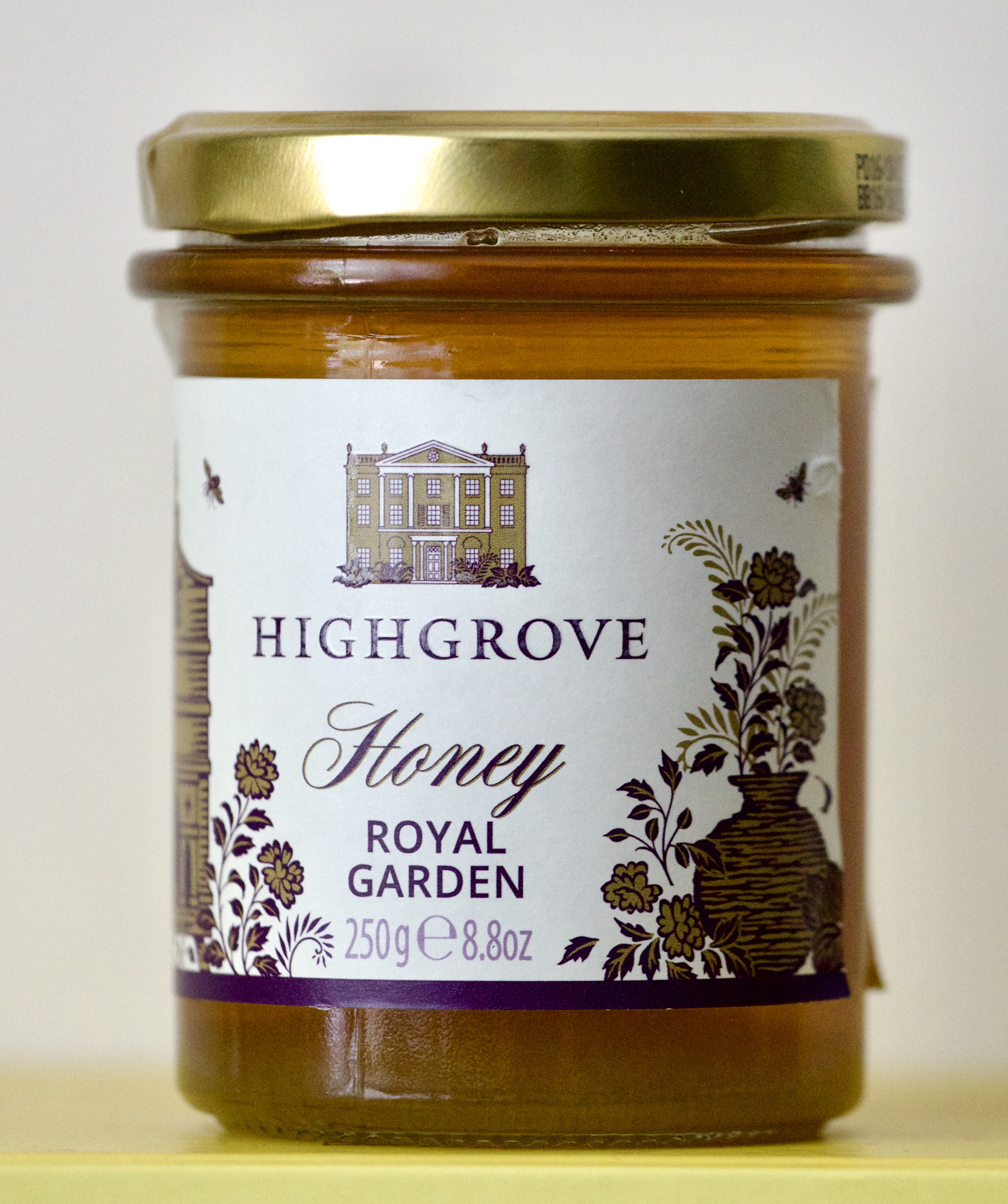
Highgrove honey produced on the estate of King Charles III

Beekeeping in the United Kingdom is the maintenance of bee colonies by humans within the United Kingdom. It is a significant commercial activity that provides those involved with honey, beeswax, royal jelly, queen bees, propolis, flower pollen and bee pollen. Honeybees also provide pollination services to orchards and a variety of seed crops.

Many beekeepers keep bees as a hobby. Others do it for income either as a sideline to other work or as a commercial operator. These factors affect the number of colonies maintained by the beekeeper.

== History ==
"Hive beekeeping was almost certainly introduced in the east of England from continental Europe and transmitted through Britain from east to west. We do not know when the introduction occurred".

Skeps or baskets made from wicker or coils of straw or grass were used as hives to house the bees and protect them from the weather and predators.

Due to the vital role beekeeping played in British agriculture and industry, special allotments of sugar were allowed for each hive during World War II. In 1943, the Ministry of Food announced that beekeepers would qualify for supplies of sugar not exceeding 10 pounds per colony to keep their beehives going through the winter, and 5 pounds for spring feeding. Honey was not rationed, but its price was controlled - as with other unrationed, domestically produced produce, sellers imposed their own restrictions.

== Modern beekeeping ==
In the winter of 2008, about 20% of the UK's bees died. The losses were highest in the north of England and lowest in the east. These winter losses subsequently increased in the following years as some of the treatments used to combat Varroa lost their efficacy. New treatments have since been licensed for use in the UK to reduce the losses.

The government researches bees at its National Bee Unit, run by the Food and Environment Research Agency at Sand Hutton in North Yorkshire, close to A64.

The Bees Act 1980 is an act of the Parliament of the United Kingdom that seeks to stop the damage caused by diseases, chemicals (such as Imidacloprid and pests that damage the well being of bees). It repealed the Agriculture (Miscellaneous Provisions) Act 1941. The act currently does not extend to Northern Ireland which, since devolution, has enacted its own equivalent legislation called the Bees (Northern Ireland) Order 1980.

The National Bee Unit is responsible for the delivery of the Bee Health Programme in England and Wales. It is based in Sand Hutton in North Yorkshire.

The National Honey Show, the first of which was held 1923 at The Crystal Palace, is an annual British show of honey and other bee products.

The BBKA Spring Convention is an annual event which has 20+ Lectures; 60+ Workshops & Seminars for beekeepers of all abilities. It would have been held at Harper Adams University in Shropshire on 3–5 April 2020, however it was cancelled due to the Coronavirus Pandemic. The 2021 event was a virtual event for the same reason however in 2022 it was again held at Harper Adams University.

== Associations and organisations ==
- The British Beekeepers Association (BBKA) (established 1874) represents amateur beekeepers in England, Wales, Northern Ireland, the Isle of Man and Jersey. There are many local associations, within the county associations, which are within the BBKA. The association is a registered charity. It is based at the National Agricultural Centre in the National Beekeeping Centre, where it has been since July 2000, although it has been at Stoneleigh since 1982. Previous to 1943 it was based on Bedford Street in London. From these premises, the Beekeepers' Record and British Beekeepers' Journal were published.
- The Ulster Beekeepers Association (UBKA) represents the interests of amateur beekeepers in Northern Ireland.
- The Scottish Beekeepers Association (SBA) represents the interests of amateur beekeepers in Scotland.
- The Welsh Beekeepers' Association (WBKA) represents the interests of amateur beekeepers in Wales.
- The Bee Farmers' Association of the UK (BFA) is the voice of professional beekeeping in the United Kingdom (UK). As the industry trade association, it currently represents around 450 bee farming businesses. Its members produce honey throughout the UK and supply products in bulk, for wholesale and for retail. In addition, the association provides contract pollination services to growers.
- Bee Diseases Insurance (BDI) offers insurance against notifiable diseases for beekeepers in England and Wales.
- The Council of National Beekeepers Associations (CONBA) represents the above associations in Europe.
- Bee Improvement and Bee Breeders Association (BIBBA): formally the Village Bee Breeders Association (VBBA) formed on 27 July 1963. They promote the "conservation, restoration, study, selection, and improvement of honey bees that are native to the British Isles" claiming that this bee is the Apis mellifera mellifera.
- The Central Association of Bee-Keepers (CABK) is an educational charity, registered in the UK, whose objective is to promote and further the craft of beekeeping.
- The International Bee Research Association provides information on bee science and beekeeping worldwide.
- The Eva Crane Trust advances the understanding of bees and beekeeping
- The C.B. Dennis British Beekeepers' Research Trust supports bee research that benefits bees and beekeeping in Britain

== Examinations board ==
The National Diploma in Beekeeping Examination board was established in 1954 to meet a need for a beekeeping qualification, above the level of the certificates awarded by the Beekeeping associations.

It was originally intended as an appropriate qualification for County Beekeeping Instructors and Lecturers, of which there were some forty full- and part-time appointments across the United Kingdom at that time. The prime movers in this development were Fred Richards, the C.B.I. for Norfolk and H.M.I. Franklin, whose brief included rural education. Although the County Lecturers have disappeared from the beekeeping scene since the privatisation of the agricultural colleges, there are still beekeepers wishing to pursue their studies to an advanced level. The NDB offers them the opportunity to undertake such study.

== Notable beekeepers ==
- Brother Adam (1898-1996)
- Samuel Bagster (1800-1835)
- Ernest Balch (1869-1958)
- Annie Betts (1884-1961)
- Edward Bevan (1770-1860)
- Charles Butler (1571-1647)
- Alec Wilfred Gale (1900-1969)
- Richard Carew (1555-1620)
- Thomas Gibson-Carmichael (1859-1926)
- William Broughton Carr (1836-1909)
- William Cleland (1912-2005)
- William Cotton (1813-1879)
- Beowulf Cooper (1917-1982)
- Thomas William Cowan (1840-1926)
- Eva Crane (1912-2007)
- Robert Drury(1687-1743/50)
- Robert Ellery (1827-1908)
- R. O. B. Manley (1888-1978)
- Adrian Stoop (1883-1957)

== See also ==
- Beekeeping in Ireland
- BS National Beehive (the most common form of beehive used in the UK)
- Agriculture in the United Kingdom
- Apimondia
- June Gap
