= Savannah Bee Company =

American retail company

- Company type: Private
- Industry: Retail
- Founded: 2002; 24 years ago in Savannah, Georgia
- Headquarters: Savannah, Georgia, U.S.
- Number of locations: 16
- Key people: Ted Dennard (Founder)
- Products: Honey, other food and beauty products
- Website: Savannah Bee Company

Savannah Bee Company is an American company based in Savannah, Georgia and founded by Ted Dennard in 2002. The company sells honey-related products and books, beauty products, beverages, and candles. The Savannah Bee Company has 16 locations in the United States.

== Founder ==
Ted Dennard is the founder and CEO of the company. He was a beekeeper, and in 1999 his Tupelo Honey was sold in a friend's Savannah Georgia store. Dennard founded the Savannah Bee Company 3 years later, in 2002.

Dennard is concerned with bee conservation and threats to bee populations. In 2016 the company began to invest in teaching children about bees. He created a not for profit organization named the "Bee Cause Project". There are now 320 schools in all 50 states which have bee hives.

In 2015 Dennard received a permit from the Bahamian government to bring 12 bee hives to the Bahamas. In 6 months the bee keepers were able to begin harvesting honey. From those bees the estimate is that there are now 15 hives.

== Company details ==
In 2014 the Savannah Bee Company featured in Google's economic report. Google stated in a press release: "The Savannah Bee Company has utilized online sales to better achieve results without expending a lot of money, as evidenced by their website's exponential growth." In 2013 the company's online sales of honey, health and other products grossed $1.35 million.

By 2019 the company had opened 14 stores in the United States, with multiple stores in Tennessee, South Carolina, and Georgia, as well as stores in Arizona, Connecticut, Colorado, and Florida.

The Savannah Bee Company is referred to as a "major player in the honey market".

The Savannah Bee Company sells several different types of honey, from nectar that bees collect from one flower. An example is Tupelo Honey: bees are moved to the area where the Tupelo tree blooms, and the resulting honey is from that flower only. The company sells 700,000 containers of honey per year, which is 350,000 pounds of honey.

As of 2020, there are 160 people working for the company, and 2,000 independent retailers selling Savannah Bee Honey.

== See also ==
- Bee pollen
- Infant botulism
- Honey hunting
- List of spreads
- More than Honey‍—‌a 2012 Swiss documentary film on the current state of honey bees and beekeeping
- National Honey Show
