= List of Northern American nectar sources for honey bees =

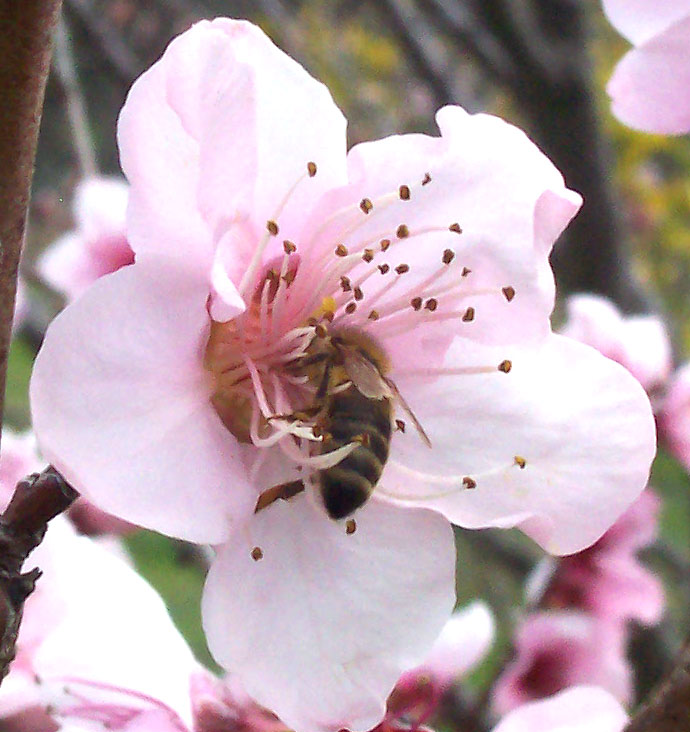
A honey bee collecting nectar from an apricot flower.

The nectar resource in a given area depends on the kinds of flowering plants present and their blooming periods. Which kinds grow in an area depends on soil texture, soil pH, soil drainage, daily maximum and minimum temperatures, precipitation, extreme minimum winter temperature, and growing degree days. The plants listed below grow in USDA hardiness zone 5. A good predictor for when a plant will bloom and produce nectar is a calculation of the growing degree days. Hopkins' bioclimatic law states that in North America east of the Rockies, a 130-m (400-foot) increase in elevation, a 4° change in latitude North (444.48 km), or a 10° change in longitude East (two-thirds of a time zone) will cause a biological event to occur four days later in the spring or four days earlier in the fall. In botany, the term phenology refers to the timing of flower emergence, sequence of bloom, fruiting, and leaf drop in autumn.

The classification in major or minor nectar sources is very dependent on the agricultural use of the land. An agricultural crop such as canola or alfalfa may be a major or minor source depending on local plantings. Generally, the more diverse a forage area is, the better for a stationary apiary. Urban, suburban, and uncultivated areas provide more consistent warm-season nectar forage than areas that are heavily cultivated with only a few agricultural crops. The nectar sources from large cultivated fields of blooming apples, cherries, canola, melons, sunflowers, clover, etc. benefit a bee keeper who is willing to travel with his hives throughout the season.

Honeydew sources are not included in this listing.

== Trees and shrubs ==
Plant type	Nonscientific name	Scientific name	Begin Bloom Month	End Bloom Month	Monofloral honey	Availability	Source for honey bees / pounds of honey per acre
T	Maple	Acer	1	5	no	feral	major but temperature usually too cold
T	Red maple	Acer rubrum	1	5	no	feral	major but temperature usually too cold for bees to fly
T	Ohio buckeye	Aesculus glabra	4	5	no	feral	minor
S	Shadbush	Amelanchier arborea	4	5	no	feral	minor, or major depending on location and weather.
S, T	Devil's walkingstick	Aralia spinosa	7	8	no	feral	minor
S	Red Chokeberry	Aronia arbutifolia, Photinia pyrifolia	5	6	no	feral	minor
S	Black chokeberry	Aronia melanocarpa	5	6	no	feral	minor
T	Catalpa, Indian bean	Catalpa speciosa	6	7	no	feral, ornamental	minor
S	Common hackberry	Celtis occidentalis	4	5	no	feral	minor
S	Buttonbush	Cephalanthus occidentalis	7	8	Honey is light in color and mild in flavor.	feral	
S	Hawthorn	Crataegus	4	5	no	feral	minor – 50–100 lb/acre
S	Honeysuckle	Diervilla lonicera	6	8			minor
T	Honey locust	Gleditsia triacanthos	5	6	no	feral	minor
S	American holly	Ilex opaca	4	6	no	feral	minor, important in Southeastern US
T	Tulip-tree, poplar	Liriodendron tulipifera	5	6	yes, see Monofloral honey	feral	major in southern Appalachians, select northern locations, and Piedmont
T	Apple	Malus domestica	4	5	No, the nectar is mostly used for spring brood-raising and not stored for surplus.	cultivated	minor
T	Crabapple	Malus sylvestris; Malus coronaria	3	6	no	ornamental	minor
T	Cherry	Prunus cerasus	4	5	no	feral, cultivated	minor – 30 kg/ha
T	Pear	Pyrus communis	4	5	no	cultivated	minor
T	Black cherry	Prunus serotina	4	5	no	feral, cultivated	minor, can be major under the correct conditions/location
T	Plum	Prunus	4	5	no	feral, cultivated	minor
S	Common buckthorn	Rhamnus cathartica	5	6	no	feral	minor
T	Sumac	Rhus glabra	6	7	mixed with other honeys	feral	major
T	Black locust	Robinia pseudoacacia	5	6	yes	feral	major – 800–1200 lb/acre; short bloom period of about 10 days
S	Raspberry	Rubus	5	6	yes	feral, cultivated	major in some areas
S	Blackberry	Rubus spp.	5	6	yes	feral, cultivated	major in some areas
T	Willow	Salix	2	4	no	feral, ornamental	major, but outside temperatures are usually too cold for bees to fly, 100–150 lb/acre; 1,500 lb pollen
T	Pussy willow	Salix discolor	3	4	no	feral, ornamental	major but temperature usually too cold for bees to fly
T	Bee bee tree	Tetradium	7	9		ornamental	major
T	Basswood	Tilia americana, Tilia cordata	6	7	yes, short flow up to 14 days; white, aromatic honey see Monofloral honey	feral, ornamental, produces a high volume of honey on a cycle of every five to eight years, with lower volume of nectar other years	major – 800–1,100 lb/acre
T	American elm	Ulmus americana	2	4	no	feral	minor
S	Blueberry	Vaccinium corymbosum, Vaccinium angustifolium, Vaccinium pennsylvanicum	5	6	no, honey amber and of good flavor	cultivated	minor in most areas, very low quality pollen, strong colonies may store 50–90 lb of surplus from it
S	Black haw	Viburnum prunifolium	5	6			
T	Redbud	Cercis	4	4	no	cultivated, ornamental	minor
T	Sourwood	Oxydendrum arboreum	6	7	yes	feral	major

== Flowers, crops, herbs, and grasses ==
Plant type	Common name	Latin name	Perennial/annual	Begin bloom month	End bloom month	Monofloral honey	Availability	Nectar production
F	Anise hyssop	Agastache foeniculum	Perennial	7	10	no	feral	minor (1858–2787 kg/ha)
F	Blue bugle, bugleherb, bugleweed, carpetweed, common bugle	Ajuga reptans	Perennial	5	6		feral	minor
F	Chives	Allium schoenoprasum	Perennial	5	9	no	cultivated	minor
C, F	Garlic chives	Allium tuberosa	Perennial	8	9	no	cultivated	minor
F	Leadwort	Amorpha fruticosa	Perennial	6	7	no	feral	minor
F	Milkweed	Asclepias spp. 55 species	Perennial	7	8		feral, all species are great for honeybees, nectar is so abundant that shaking the blossoms allows visible nectar fall	major – 120–250 lb/acre, depending on soil and if good fertilization, Asclepias syriaca has the highest honey yield.
F	Butterfly weed	Asclepias tuberosa	Perennial	7	8	no	feral	minor
C	Asparagus	Asparagus officinalis	Perennial	5	6	no	cultivated	minor
F	Milk vetch	Astragalus spp.	Perennial	5	6	no	feral	minor
F	Aster	Aster spp.	Perennial	8	10	usually mixed with goldenrod	feral, ornamental	major
F	Borage	Borago officinalis	Annual	6	10	no	feral, ornamental	minor, but can be major on cultivated area, 200 lb/acre honey, 60–160 lb pollen
C, F	Mustard	Brassica arvenisis	Annual	4	5	no?	cultivated	minor
C	Oil rapeseed (canola)	Brassica napus L., Brassica rapa	Annual	5	6	yes	cultivated	major
F	Marigold	Calendula officinalis	Annual	6	9	no	ornamental	minor
F	Canada thistle	Carduus arvensis	Perennial			light honey of good quality		
F	Thistle	Centaurea spp.	Annual	7	9	no	feral	minor
F	Mountain bluet	Centaurea Montana (Knapweed)	Short-lived Perennial	5	5	no??	feral	major
F	Creeping thistle	Cirsium arvense	Perennial	7	9		feral (invasive in North America)	
F	Sweet autumn clematis	Clematis terniflora	Perennial	9	9		ornamental	minor
F	Clethra, summersweet	Clethra alnifolia	Perennial (shrub)	7	8	no	feral	minor
C, F	Cucumber		Annual	6	9	no; honey is pale yellow or amber with strong flavor	cultivated	minor
C	Melon		Annual	6	10	no	cultivated	minor
C	Pumpkin	Cucurbita pepo L.	Annual	6	10	no	cultivated	minor
C, F	Wild carrot	Daucus carota	Biennial	8	9	no	feral	minor
F	Leopard's bane	Doronicum cordatum	Perennial	4	5	no	feral	minor
F	Candytuft	Iberis sempervirens	Perennial	5	5			
F	Viper's bugloss, blue thistle,	Echium vulgare Echium vulgare is most widely known, though about 60 additional species exist	Perennial	6	8	no	feral In California, spring-blooming plant with repeat bloom, fall bloom provides nectar for bees for overwintering. The most unusual feature of E. vulgare is the protection of the nectar inside the flower from vaporization (when weather is hot) or flushing away (when rains).	major – 300–1,000 lb/acre honey depending on soil, 500–2000 lb of dark blue pollen
F	Globe thistle	Echinops ritro	Annual	8	8		feral	major
F	Fireweed	Epilobium angustifolium	Perennial	6	9	yes	feral	major
F	Heather	Erica vulgaris, though many varieties	Perennial (shrub)			see Monofloral honey		100–200 lb honey
F	Joe-Pye weed, boneset, white snakeroot	Eutrochium spp., Eupatorium spp., Eupatorium purpureum; Eupatorium perfoliatum; Eupatorium ageratoides	Perennial	8	9	no	feral	minor
C, F	Buckwheat	Fagopyrum esculentum	Annual	7	8	can be, dark honey with distinct flavor, granulates quickly	rarely cultivated now	minor
F	Blue vine	Gonolobus laevis	Perennial			no, honey is clear, heavy bodied, of excellent flavor	feral	minor, strong hives can collect up to 100 lb
C, F	Soybean	Glycine soja	Annual	7	10		cultivated	major
C, F	Sunflower	Helianthus annuus	Annual	6	9	can be	feral, cultivated	minor – 30–100 pounds/acre
C, F	Basil	Koellia	Annual			no	cultivated	minor
F	Henbit, deadnettle	Lamium sp	Perennial	3	5	no	feral	minor, but valuable due to earliness/frost hardiness
C, F	Lavender	Lavandula angustifolia	Perennial (shrub)	6	9	can be	cultivated	minor
F	Birdsfoot trefoil	Lotus corniculatus	Perennial	6	8	no	feral	minor
C, F	White sweet clover	Melilotus alba	Biennial	5	8	yes	feral, cultivated	major up to 200 lb per hive
C, F	Yellow sweet clover	Melilotus officinalis	Biennial	5	8	yes	feral, cultivated	major up to 200 lb per hive
C, F	Alfalfa	Medicago sativa	Perennial	7	8	as clover honey, alfalfa honey granulates readily	feral, cultivated	major
C, F	Clover	Melilotus spp. and Trifolium spp.	Biennial	5	8	as clover honey	feral, cultivated	major – up to 500 lb/acre in a good year
F	Melissa, lemon balm	Melissa officinalis	Perennial				Western US – Prolonged bloom of 45 – 50 days generally in summer, but with repeat blooming in California. Delicate honey with very light, pinkish color.	150–250 lb/acre honey, 50–120 lb pollen
C, F	Peppermint	Mentha piperita	Perennial			no	feral	
F	Catnip, cat mint	Nepeta mussinii; Nepeta grandiflora; Nepeta cataria	Perennial	6	9	no	feral, ornamental	minor
F	Oregano	Origanum vulgare	Perennial	6	9	no	cultivated?	minor
C, F	Poppy	Papaver somniferum	Perennial					minor – 20–30 lb/acre
C, F	Phacelia, tansy	Phacelia tanacetifolia	Perennial				Western US – One of the best spring forage sources for honeybees. Blooms 45–60 days and continuously produces nectar throughout the day. Can be seeded several times per year. Prefers 3 ft of topsoil.	180–1,500 pounds honey per acre, depending on soil quality and depth; 300–1000 pounds of pollen.
G, H	Plantain	Plantago Major	Perennial	7				
F	Smartweed	Polygonum spp.	Perennial	8	9		feral	major
F	Selfheal	Prunella vulgaris	Perennial	7	8	no	feral	minor
F	Lungwort	Pulmonaria spp.	Perennial	5	5	no	feral	minor
F	Appalachian mountain mint	Pycnanthemum flexuosum	Perennial	8	10			minor
F	Azalea	Rhododendron spp.	Perennial	6	8	no	ornamental	minor
F	Russian sage	Salvia × floriferior	Perennial	7	9	can be	ornamental	minor
F	Scrophularia	Scrophularia spp.	Perennial	7	7	no	feral	minor
F	Sedum, autumn joy	Sedum spectabile	Perennial					
F	Goldenrod	Solidago spp.	Perennial	9	10	can be, honey golden color of deep amber; marked flavor; granulates quickly	feral	major
F	Woundwort	Stachys byzantina	Perennial	5	5	no	feral	minor
F	Chickweed	Stellaria media	Annual	4	7	no	feral	minor
F	Dandelion	Taraxacum officinale	Annual (Perennial not an annual)	4	5	no, honey deep yellow, granulates quickly; mostly consumed by bees during brood rearing	feral	major
F	Germander	Teucrium canadense	Perennial	7	8	no	feral	minor
F	Thyme	Thymus pulegioides; Thymus serpyllum	Perennial	6	7	no	feral, cultivated	minor – 50–150 lb/acre honey
F	Red-flowering thyme	Thymus praecox	Perennial	6	7		feral?	major
C, F	Alsike clover	Trifolium hybridum	Perennial			as clover honey, alsike clover honey is one of the best honey plants in America.	feral, cultivated	major, up to 500 lb/acre
C, F	Crimson clover	Trifolium incarnatum	Perennial			as clover honey	feral, cultivated	major
C, F	Red clover	Trifolium pratense	Perennial	6	7	as clover honey	feral, cultivated	major
C, F	White clover	Trifolium repens	Perennial	6	7	as clover honey; honey is white or nearly white; very mild flavored and does not granulate readily	feral, cultivated	major
F	Blue vervain	Verbena hastata L.	Perennial	7	8	no	ornamental?	minor
F	Tall ironweed	Vernonia altissima	Perennial	8	9	no	feral	minor
F	Speedwell	Veronica spicata	Perennial	6	6	no	feral	minor
F	Tufted vetch, common vetch	Vicia cracca	Perennial	7	8	no	feral	minor
F	Common vetch	Vicia sativa	Perennial	7	8	no	feral	minor
F	Blackhaw	Viburnum prunifolium	Perennial (shrub)	5	6	no	feral	minor

== Garden plants to feed honey bees in Canada ==
- Aster
- Bluebells (Hyacinthoides)
- Clematis
- Cornflowers (Centaurea cyanus)
- Cosmos
- Crocus
- Hellebore
- Lavandula
- Marigold (Calendula officinalis)
- Mint (Mentha)
- Primula
- Rosemary
- Rudbeckia
- Sunflower (Helianthus)

== Gallery ==
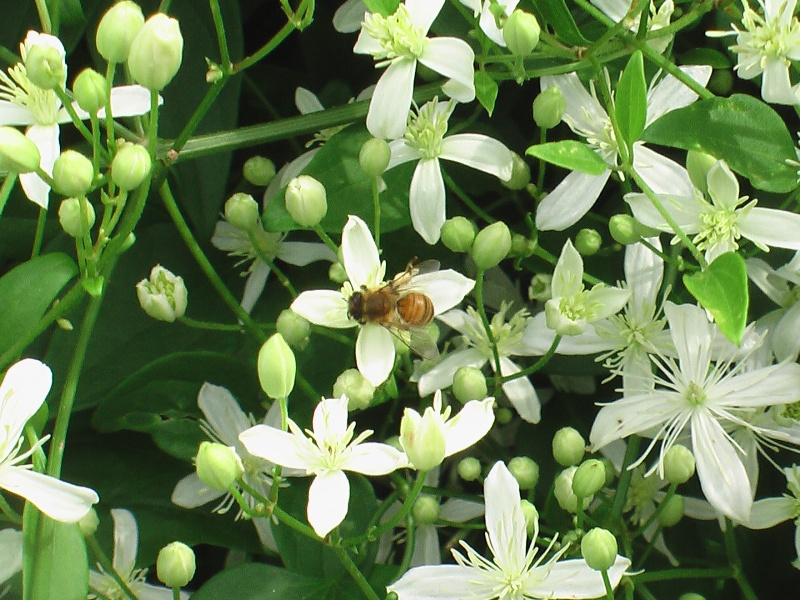
A honey bee on sweet autumn clematis in September

Honey bee on sedum 'Autumn Joy' (Hylotelephium telephium)

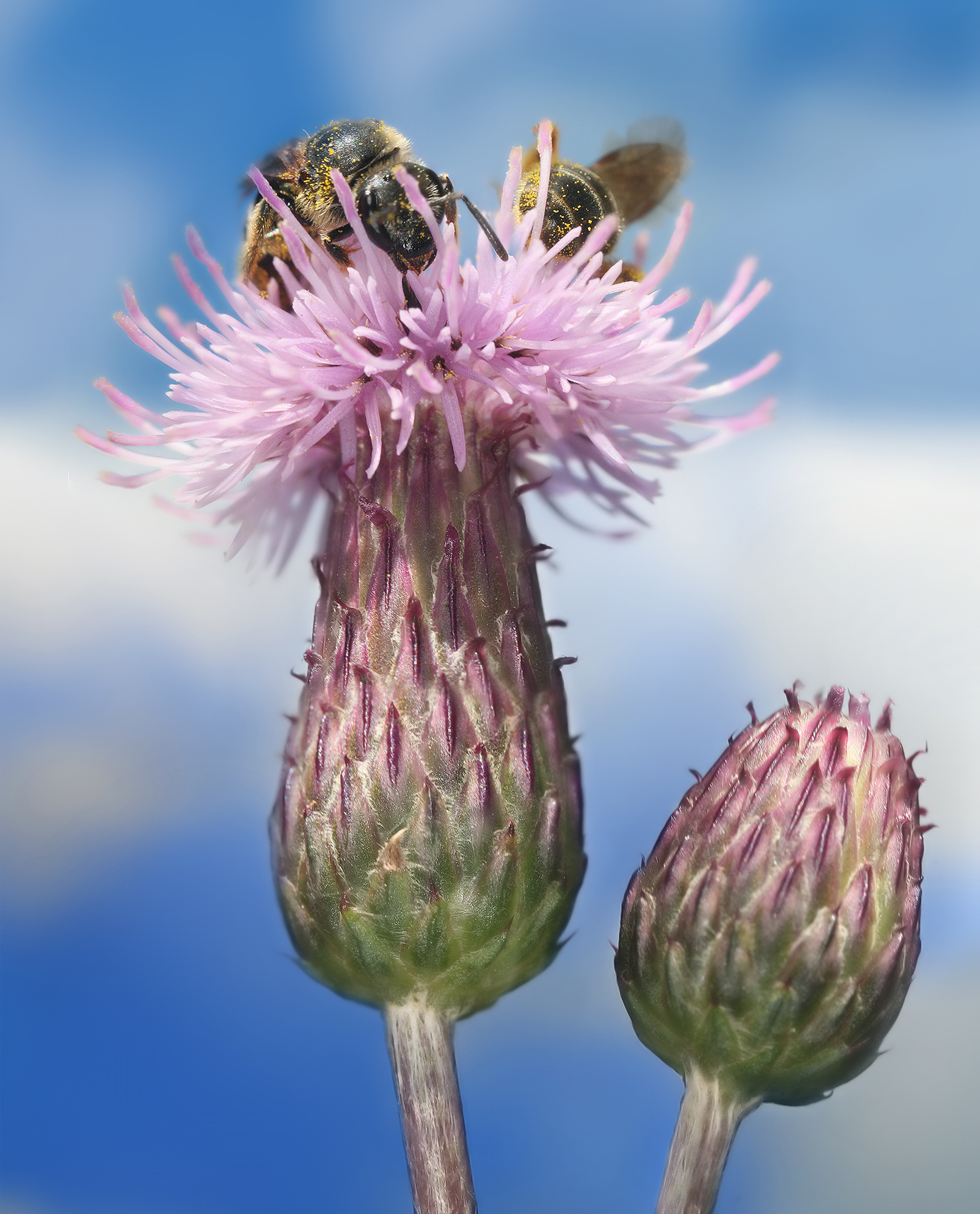
Two bees on a creeping thistle Cirsium arvense

== See also ==
- Forage (honey bee)
- List of honey plants
- List of honeydew sources
- Nectar source
- List of pollen sources
- Melliferous flower
- Regional honeys
