= Forage (honey bee) =

Bee foraging

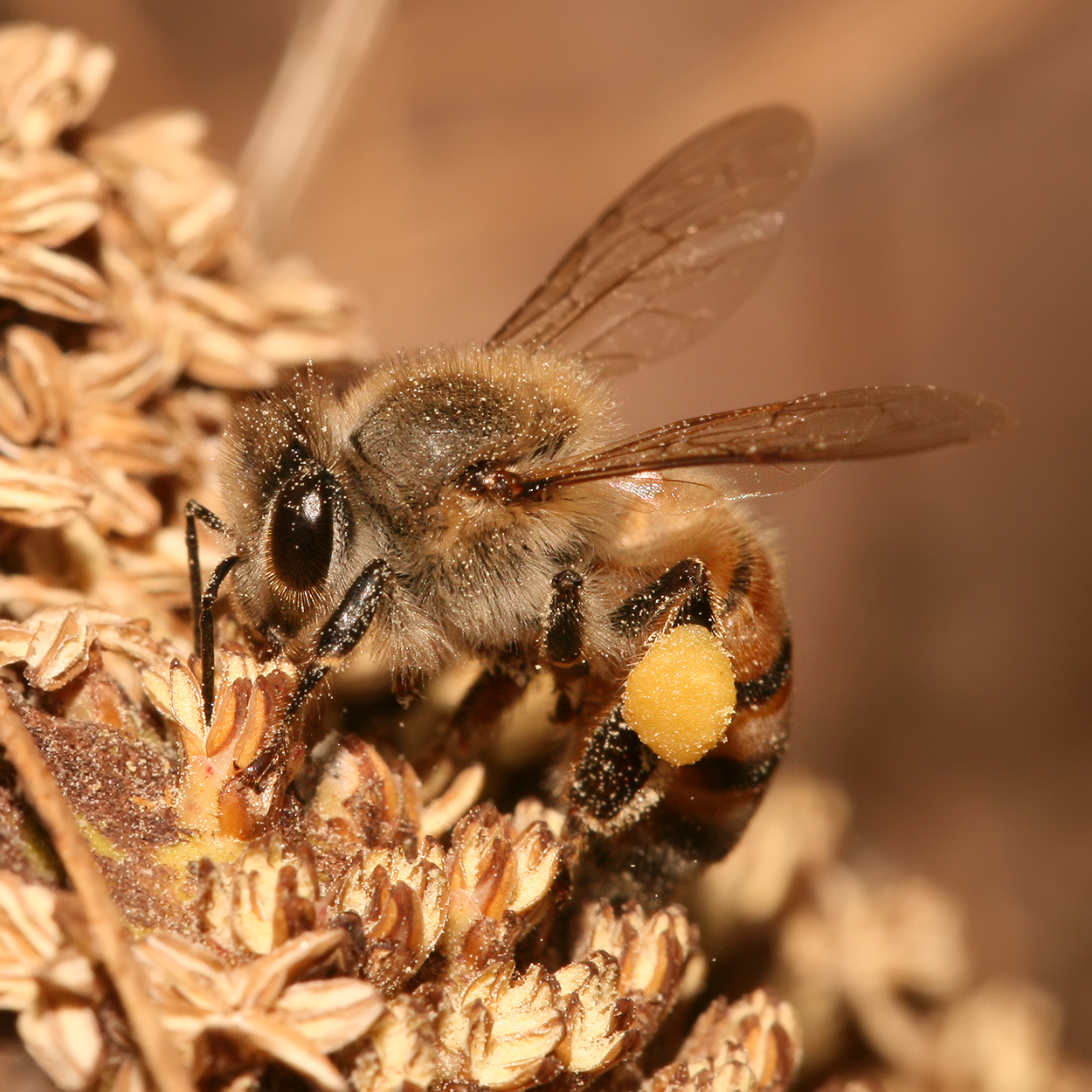
European honey bee collecting nectar and pollen

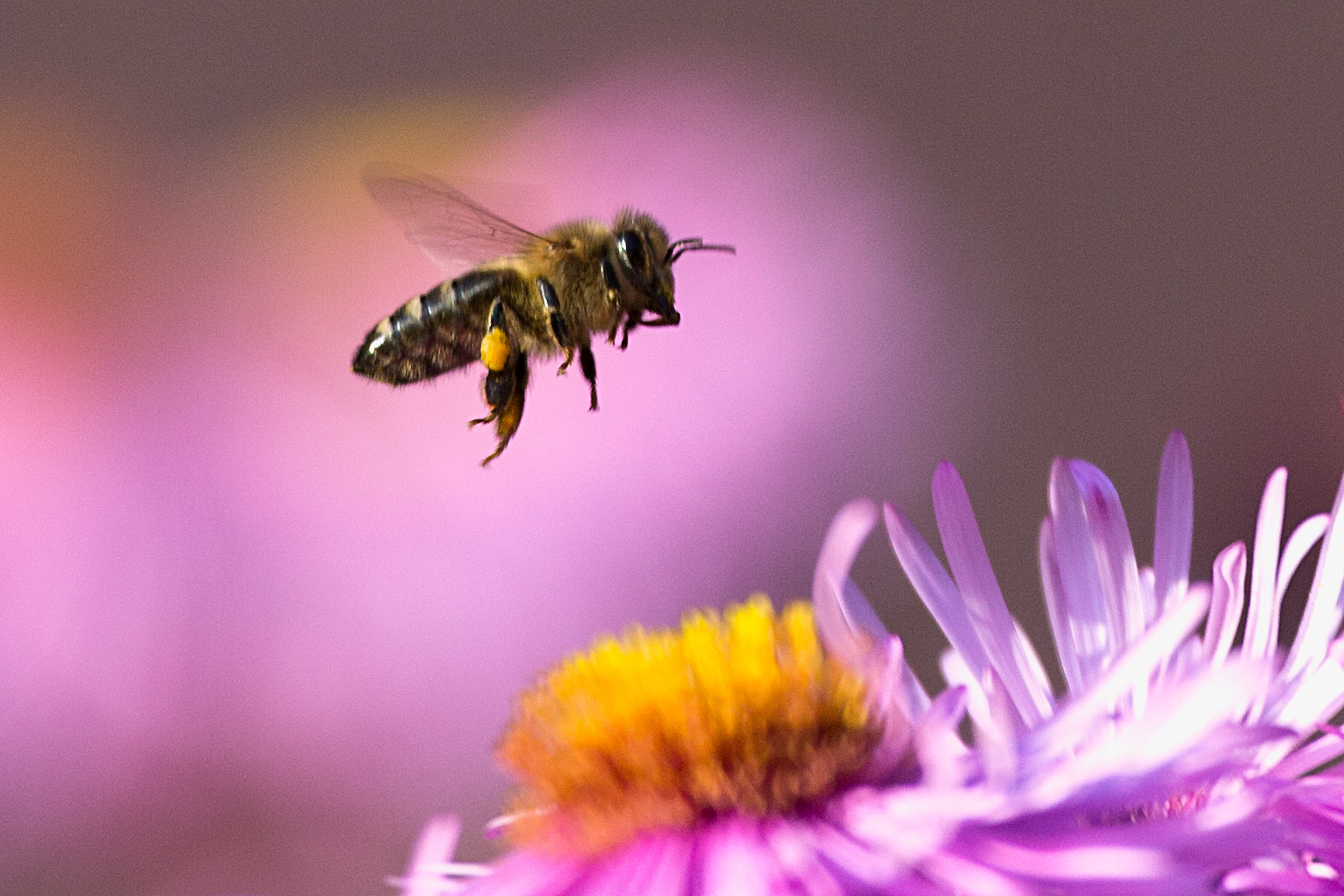
European honey bee flies back to the hive after collecting pollen. Pollen is temporarily stored in pollen baskets on the bees' legs

For bees, their forage or food supply consists of nectar and pollen from blooming plants within their flight range. The forage sources for honey bees are an important consideration for beekeepers. In order to determine where to locate hives for maximum honey production and brood one must consider the off-season. If there are no honey flows the bees may have to be fed. Bees that are used for commercial pollination are usually fed in the holding yards. Forage is also significant for pollination management with other bee species. Nectar contains sugars that are the primary source of energy for the bees' wing muscles and for heat for honey bee colonies during the winter. Pollen provides the protein and trace minerals that are mostly fed to the brood in order to replace bees lost in the normal course of their life cycle and colony activity.

As a rule of thumb, the foraging area around a beehive extends for two miles (3.2 km), although bees have been observed foraging twice and three times this distance from the hive. Experiments have shown that beehives within 4 miles of a food source will gain weight, but beyond that the energy expended is greater than that gained during the foraging flight. Foraging at extreme distances wears out the wings of individual bees, reduces the life expectancy of foraging bees and therefore the efficiency of the colony. The minimum temperature for active honeybee foraging is approximately 55 °F (13 °C). Full foraging activity is not achieved until the temperature rises to 66 °F (19 °C). There are small differences in the races of the Western honey bees at which temperature they will start foraging.

The main nectar source and main pollen source differ widely depending on the latitude, region, season and type of vegetation. Bees are able to communicate direction and distance of a food source by means of the round dance, waggle dance and shaking signals.

In addition to nectar and pollen, honey bees may forage for a honeydew source in certain coniferous trees and on oaks. One queen bee is essential to every hive as the only individual who can lay the fertilized eggs that are necessary in order to rear new workers and new queens and is therefore necessary to the continuation of the species.

== See also ==
- Honeydew source
- June Gap
- List of honey plants
- List of Northern American nectar sources for honey bees
- Melliferous flower
- Nectar source
- Pollen source
- Regional honeys
