= June gap =

Shortage of forage for honey bees in the UK and Ireland

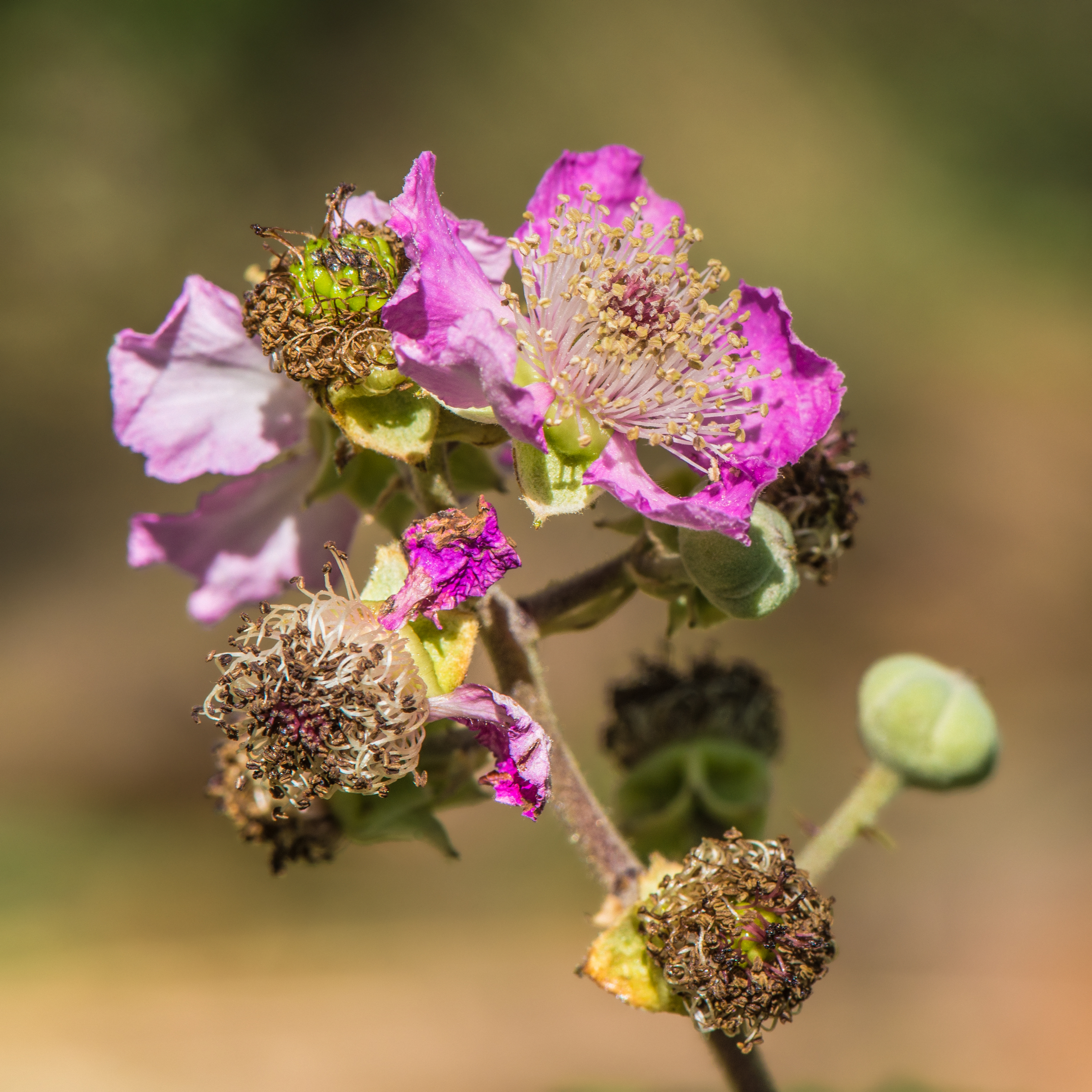
Elmleaf blackberry flowers in June

The June gap occurs in Ireland and Great Britain when there is a shortage of forage available for honey bee, typically occurring in June.

Subsequent to the massive volume of pollen and nectar produced by trees and hedges in the spring, there is a reduction in the amount of nectar available to the bees due to long grasses suppressing many wildflowers. Before the herbaceous "summer rush" of July-through-September which reinstates the high level of nectar, the high hive populations brought about by trees in the spring struggle to produce honey and may lay fewer eggs. It is a time when beekeepers need to pay special attention to the levels of honey in the hive, as well as the level of water the bees use during this gap. Annual weather patterns can cause this event to occur later or earlier.

Some plants which can provide nectar in this gap are Cotoneaster, the closely related Pyracantha, common garden [herbs], and perennial garden plants.

== See also ==
- Beekeeping in Ireland
- Beekeeping in the United Kingdom
- Forage (honeybee)
- Honeydew source
- List of honey plants
- Pollen source
