= PROteINSECT =

The PROteINSECT project is a European Union initiative, coordinated by the UK Food and Environment Research Agency (FERA), that would legalize the use of insects as an alternative protein source in feed for industrial farming.

In 2013 PROteINSECT has produced a mapping report with regard to current Legislation & Regulation on using insects in animal feed in the EU, as well as PROteINSECT Partner Countries.

PROteINSECT consortium has 3 year (2013-2016) partnership from Europe, Africa and Asia, ranging from feed industry multinationals, research centres and universities, to farmers and experts in policy change and communications.
