= George Adam Reay =

Scottish chemist and fish technologist (1901-1971)

Dr. George Adam Reay FRSE FRIC CBE (31 May 1901–20 January 1971) was a 20th-century Scottish biochemist and fish technologist who helped set up the Torry Research Station and served as its first director.

== Life ==
He was born in Aberdeen on 31 May 1901 the son of Adam Reay, an engineer, and his wife Helen Glass Cownie. The family lived at 6 Ferryhill Terrace. He was educated at Robert Gordon's College then studied Science at Aberdeen University graduating MA in 1921 and a further BSc in 1923. He then did postgraduate studies at Cambridge University gaining a doctorate (PhD) in 1927.

After this he joined the Department of Scientific and Industrial Research in Aberdeen under Sir William Bate Hardy, and was with them when they set up the Torry Research Station in 1929, being posted as its first Officer in Charge and in 1937 being given the title director. He worked to investigate improved methods of handling white fish catches at sea, and was one of the first to emphasise the importance of storing fish at low temperatures and of quick freezing, leading to the technique of freezing freshly caught fish at sea which gained commercial acceptance from the early 1960s onwards.

In 1955 he was elected a Fellow of the Royal Society of Edinburgh. His proposers were Sir Edmund Hirst, Donald McArthur, John Barclay Tait, Cyril Lucas and Thomas Phemister.

He retired in 1964 and died, following a short illness, in Aberdeen Royal Infirmary on 20 January 1971. He is buried at Dunnottar churchyard near Stonehaven.

== Publications ==
- The Handling and Storage of White Fish at Sea (1929)

== Family ==
He was married to Tina Mary Margaret Shewan (1900–1980) in 1928. They had two children.
