= Torry freshness =

UK standard for the freshness of fish

The Torry Freshness Score is a systematic scoring system, originating in the UK, for the freshness of fish, based on an objective sensory assessment method. The tester(s) will smell the fish gill odour to assess the state of freshness. Fish are ranked on a numeric scale from 0 to 10. 10 is the highest score for newly-caught fish, 7 is in the neutral range, 6 is at the 'borderline', and fish scoring of 3 or lower is considered spoiled.

Customers will generally reject fish when its Torry score is 6 or lower, which indicates that the fish has been on ice for 11 days or more. The test may be performed on both raw and cooked (without seasoning or other ingredients) fish, and the criteria are generally fish-species specific. The results of evaluation generally correlate to the presence and density of microorganisms that cause spoilage, as a lower score implies a greater presence of such microorganisms. The test relies on human sensory perception as the input, although recently electronic tools have been developed to validate the readings. Generally the test is important and relevant to daily activities in fish marketing.

The scale was originally developed at the Torry Research Station of the Central Science Laboratory.
