= Pollen basket =

Part of the tibia on certain species of bees

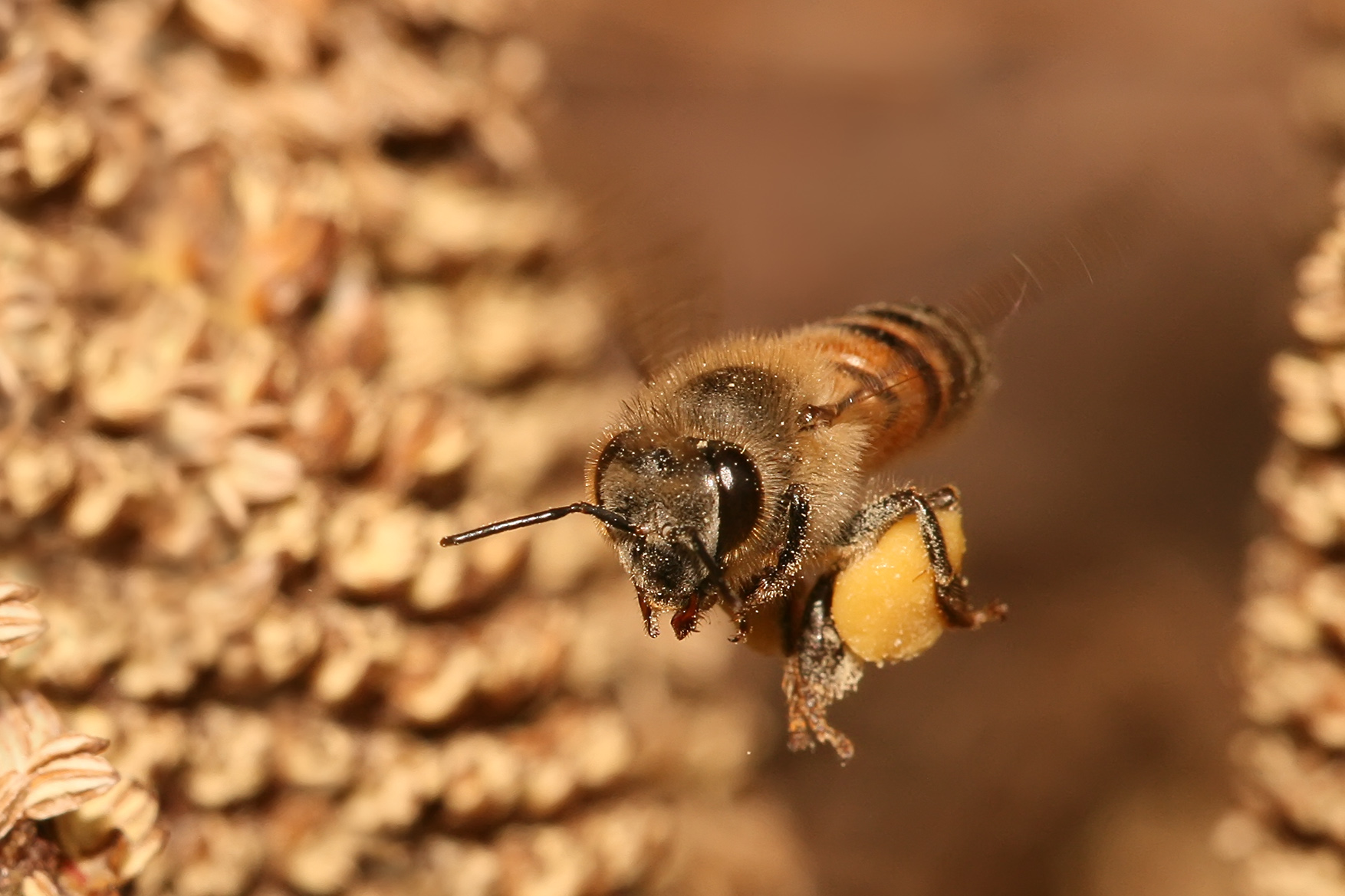
A European honey bee with corbicula full of pollen, returning to the hive

The pollen basket or corbicula (plural corbiculae) is part of the tibia on the hind legs of the female of certain species of bees. They use the structure in harvesting pollen and carrying it to the nest or hive where it is used as food by the colony.

Bee species with no pollen baskets have scopae, which fulfil a similar role.

== Etymology ==
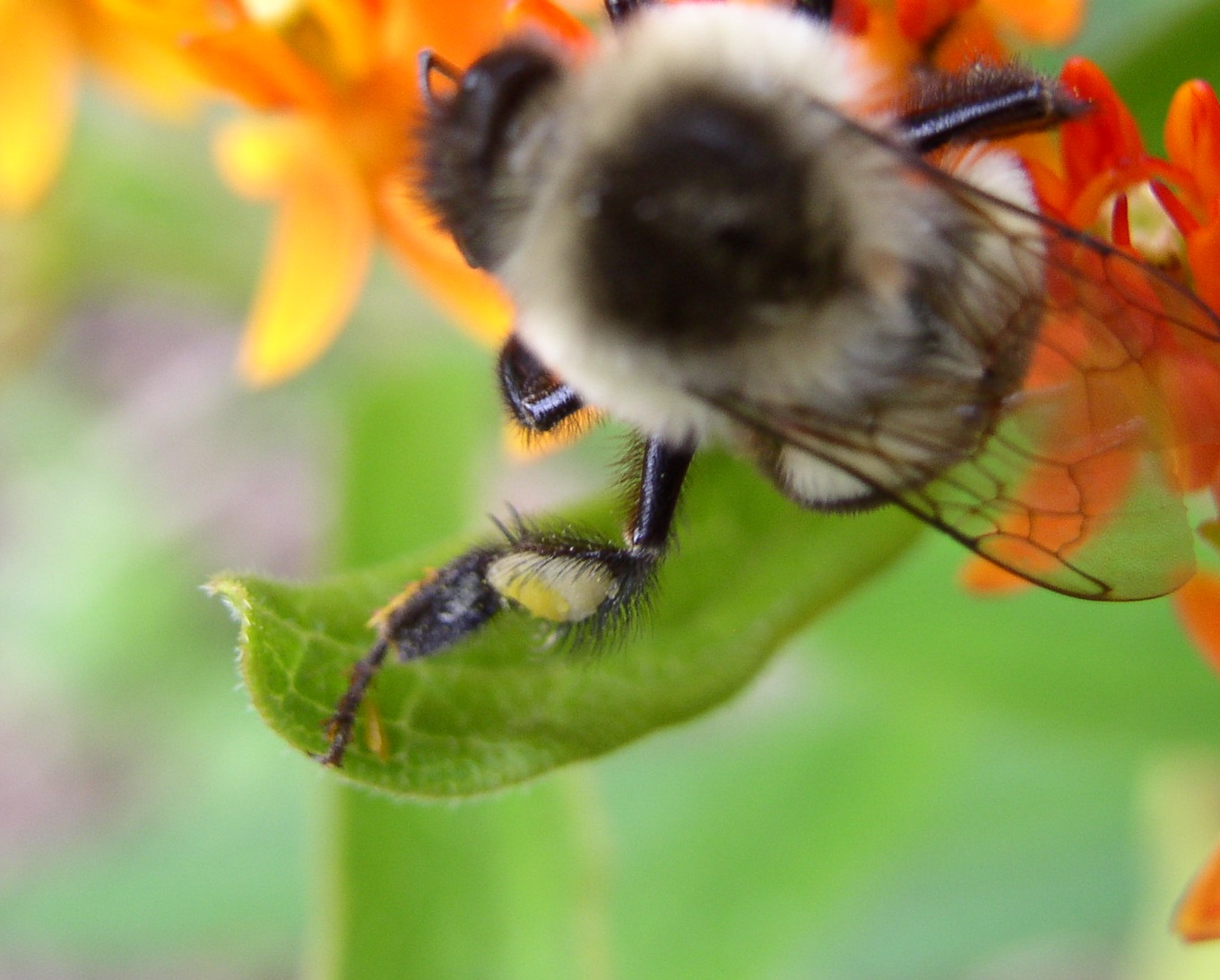
Pollen basket on the tibia of the hind leg of a bumblebee

There was little formal description of the corbicula before Carl Linnaeus explained the biological function of pollen in the mid-18th century. In English the first edition of Encyclopædia Britannica described the structure in 1771 without giving it any special name. The second edition, 1777, refers to the corbicula simply as the "basket". By 1802 William Kirby had introduced the Neo-Latin term corbicula into English. He had borrowed it, with acknowledgement, from Réaumur. Like other Latin anatomical terms, this had the advantages of specificity, international acceptability, and culture neutrality. By 1820 the term pollen-basket seems to have gained acceptance in beekeeping, though a century later a compendium of entomological terminology recognised pollen-plate and corbicula without including the term pollen-basket. A century later, the authors of "Imms" included only the terms scopa and corbicula in the index, with pollen basket in the text.

Corbicula is a diminutive of corbis, a basket or pannier. It is the singular, with plural corbiculae, but since at least c. 1866 some authors have thought corbicula to be the plural of a non-existent neuter form corbiculum.

== Structure and function ==
Bees in four tribes of the family Apidae, subfamily Apinae have corbiculae: the honey bees, bumblebees, stingless bees, and orchid bees. The corbicula is a polished cavity surrounded by a fringe of hairs, into which the bee collects the pollen; most other bees possess a structure called the scopa, which is similar in function, but is a dense mass of branched hairs into which pollen is pressed, with pollen grains held in place in the narrow spaces between the hairs. A honey bee moistens the forelegs with its protruding tongue and brushes the pollen that has collected on its head, body and forward appendages to the hind legs. The pollen is transferred to the pollen comb on the hind legs and then combed, pressed, compacted, and transferred to the corbicula on the outside surface of the tibia of the hind legs.

In Apis species, a single hair functions as a pin that secures the middle of the pollen load. Either honey or nectar is used to moisten the dry pollen, producing the product known as bee pollen or bee bread. The mixing of the pollen with nectar or honey changes the color of the pollen. The color of the pollen can help identify the pollen source.
