= National Honey Show =

UK food festival

Coordinates: 51.3733°N 0.3623°W

- Formation: 1923
- Type: Charity
- Registration no.: Charity No: 233656
- Purpose: To encourage beekeeping through the medium of national and international competitive classes for honey and related products
- Website: https://www.honeyshow.co.uk/

The National Honey Show is an annual British show of honey and other bee products.

It first took place in 1923 at The Crystal Palace, and continued to be held there until 1936, when The Crystal Palace burnt down. For a time it was held at St George's College, Weybridge, Surrey; it is now held every October at Sandown Park Racecourse.

Events that take place at the show include several competitions (e.g. honey, mead, and beeswax), workshops and lectures.

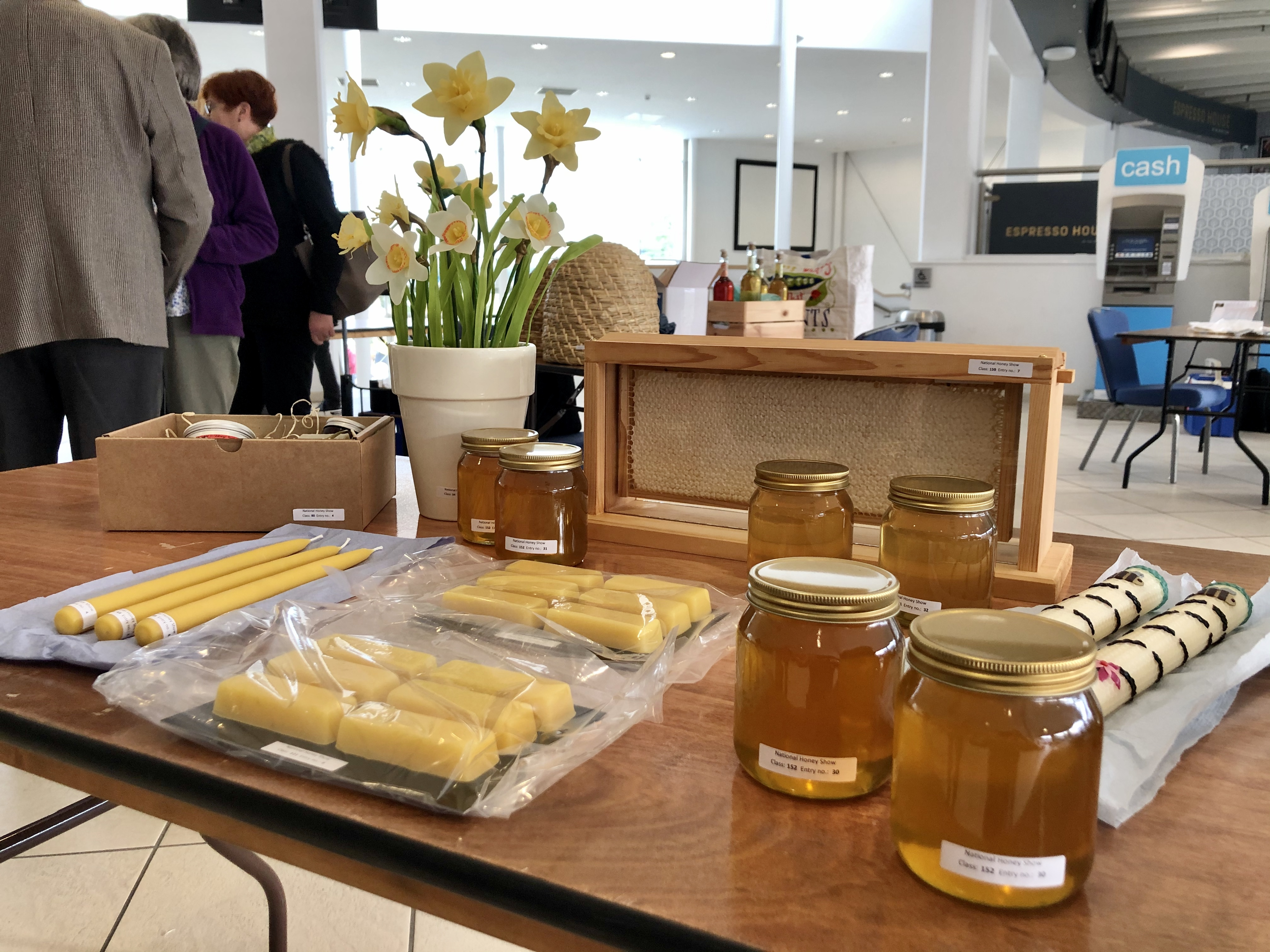
Honey on display at the 2019 show

== See also ==
- Beekeeping in the United Kingdom
