= Bees Act 1980 =

Act of the Parliament of the United Kingdom

Bees Act 1980 (Note: Section 5(1).)
- Act of Parliament
- Parliament of the United Kingdom
- Long title: An Act to make new provision for the control of pests and diseases affecting bees.
- Citation: 1980 c. 12
- Territorial extent: England and Wales; Scotland; Northern Ireland (section 4); (Note: Section 5(5).)

Dates
- Royal assent: 20 March 1980
- Commencement: 10 June 1980 (Note: Section 5(2); the Bees Act 1980 (Commencement) Order 1980 (SI 1980/791).)
Other legislation
Amends	Agriculture (Miscellaneous Provisions) Act 1941; Agriculture (Miscellaneous Provisions) Act 1954
Amended by	Criminal Procedure (Scotland) Act 1975; Criminal Justice Act 1982; Animal Health (Fixed Penalty Notices) (Scotland) Regulations 2026

Status: Amended

Text of statute as originally enacted

Revised text of statute as amended

Text of the Bees Act 1980 as in force today (including any amendments) within the United Kingdom, from legislation.gov.uk.

The Bees Act 1980 (c. 12) is an act of the Parliament of the United Kingdom that provides for the control of pests and diseases affecting bees in Great Britain.

== Provisions ==
=== Powers ===
Section 1 of the act allows the Minister of Agriculture, Fisheries and Food (a post since replaced by the Secretary of State for Environment, Food and Rural Affairs), the Secretary of State for Scotland and the Secretary of State for Wales, acting jointly, to make an order containing whatever provision they think fit to prevent pests or diseases affecting bees from being introduced into, or spreading within, Great Britain. An order may prohibit or regulate the importation into, or movement within, Great Britain of bees, honeycombs, bee products, beehives, and other appliances used in keeping or transporting bees, and may deal with the matters listed in the schedule to the act, such as licensing, the supply of information, treatment, cleansing and disinfection, the marking of hives, the recovery of costs and the payment of compensation. Orders are made by statutory instrument and are subject to annulment by resolution of either House of Parliament.

An authorised person, meaning a person authorised in writing by the responsible minister, may examine any bees or other things subject to control under an order and take samples of them to see if they are free from infection. If bees or other things are found to be infected, or to have been exposed to infection, an authorised person may destroy them or cause them to be destroyed. Bees or other things imported in contravention of an order may be destroyed in the same way, with or without first giving an opportunity for them to be re-exported. No compensation is payable for the exercise of the powers of examination or of destroying illegal imports, although an order may provide for compensation for things destroyed because of infection. Expenses incurred by the ministers are paid out of money provided by Parliament.

Section 2 of the act allows an authorised person to enter, at any time, any premises or other place, or any vessel, boat, hovercraft, aircraft or other vehicle, on or in which he has reasonable grounds for supposing there are or have been bees or other things subject to control under an order. If required by the owner, occupier or person in charge, he must produce evidence of his authority before entering.

=== Offences ===
Section 1(7) of the act makes it an offence to import bees or other things into Great Britain, or to move them within Great Britain, in contravention of an order, or otherwise to contravene or fail to comply with an order or with a condition of a licence issued under it. The maximum penalty on summary conviction was originally a fine of £1,000. Section 2(3) of the act makes it an offence intentionally to obstruct a person exercising the power of entry, for which the maximum penalty on summary conviction was originally a fine of £200.

=== Application ===
The act extends to England and Wales and Scotland. It does not extend to Northern Ireland, except for section 4, which provided that an Order in Council under the Northern Ireland Act 1974 that made provision for Northern Ireland corresponding to the act would be subject to annulment by resolution of either House of Parliament, rather than to the affirmative procedure that otherwise applied.

=== Repeals and savings ===
Section 5(3) of the act repealed sections 11 and 12(8) of the Agriculture (Miscellaneous Provisions) Act 1941 (4 & 5 Geo. 6. c. 50) and section 10 of the Agriculture (Miscellaneous Provisions) Act 1954 (2 & 3 Eliz. 2. c. 39). Section 5(4) provided that any order in force under section 11 of the 1941 act when the act came into force would have effect as if made under section 1 of the act.

== Subsequent developments ==
The fines in sections 1(7) and 2(3) were converted into levels on the standard scale (level 5 and level 3 respectively) by the Criminal Justice Act 1982 for England and Wales and, for Scotland, by section 289G of the Criminal Procedure (Scotland) Act 1975.

Certain functions of the Secretary of State under the act in relation to Wales were transferred to the National Assembly for Wales on 1 July 1999 by the National Assembly for Wales (Transfer of Functions) Order 1999 and on 31 December 2004 by the National Assembly for Wales (Transfer of Functions) Order 2004.

Section 2A was inserted, for Scotland, by regulation 14(2) of the Animal Health (Fixed Penalty Notices) (Scotland) Regulations 2026, which came into force on 7 March 2026. Where a fixed penalty notice is issued under those regulations for an offence under the act, the period between the issue of the notice and the end of the payment period is disregarded in applying the time limit for prosecution under section 136 of the Criminal Procedure (Scotland) Act 1995.

== See also ==
- Beekeeping in the United Kingdom
