= National Collection of Plant Pathogenic Bacteria =

Bacterial culture repository in the UK

- Abbreviation: NCPPB
- Formation: 1947
- Headquarters: York, United Kingdom
- Parent organization: Fera Science
- Website: https://www.fera.co.uk/ncppb

The National Collection of Plant Pathogenic Bacteria (NCPPB) is a bacterial culture repository hosted and maintained by Fera Science in York, United Kingdom. It specializes in bacterial plant pathogens and related bacteria. The NCPPB maintains over 3,500 strains and cultures which can be ordered online for use in education and research. The service is funded by the UK Government via the Department for Environment, Food and Rural Affairs (Defra) and provides support to the UK Plant Health Service.

The collection began in 1947 when the Lister Institute decided to stop maintaining cultures which were not relevant to human health. These samples were combined with a collection at the Botany School of the University of Cambridge and maintained on behalf of the Agricultural Research Council. When the initial curator and plant pathology pioneer Dr Walter John Dowson retired in 1956 the collection was moved to the Ministry of Agriculture, Fisheries and Food (MAFF), at Harpenden. Also in this year the collection was recognised as being of national importance and was designated a National Collection. Fera Science took responsibility for the collection in 1996 when it was moved to a purpose-built facility near York.

The NCPPB holds samples of bacterial plant pathogens from all over the world as well as closely related organisms such as bacteriophages. They also receive samples to add to the collection which are new or not currently well represented.
