= Fera Science =

Research institute in North Yorkshire, England

Fera Science Limited
- Abbreviation: Fera
- Formation: 2015
- Legal status: Limited Company
- Purpose: Fera specialises in delivering science-based services to support sustainable agriculture and food production, environmental management, and conservation and in food safety and quality.
- Headquarters: York, United Kingdom
- Location: Sand Hutton, North Yorkshire, UK
- Region served: UK, Europe, and most of the world.
- Parent organization: Bridgepoint Group (75%) and the Department for Environment, Food and Rural Affairs (25%).

Fera Science, formerly the Food and Environment Research Agency, is a UK research organisation. It is a joint private/public sector venture between Bridgepoint Group and the UK Government's Department for Environment, Food and Rural Affairs (Defra).

== History ==
The Food and Environment Research Agency (FERA) was formed in 2009 by merging the Central Science Laboratory (CSL) at Sand Hutton, the Plant Health Division (PHD) / Plant Health and Seeds Inspectorate (PHSI) in York, the Plant Variety Rights Office and Seeds Division (PVS) in Cambridge and the UK Government Decontamination Service at MoD Stafford. FERA was established to support and develop a sustainable food chain, a healthy natural environment, and to protect the global community from biological and chemical risks.

In 2015, Fera Science was created as an independent entity from the UK government as a joint venture between DEFRA (25%) and Capita (75%). The Plant Health Inspectorate, Plant Varieties and Seeds, the National Bee Unit and the GM Inspectorate were split off from Fera and became part of the Animal and Plant Health Agency.

In January 2024, Capita's 75% stake in Fera Science was acquired by Bridgepoint Group for £62m.

== Function ==
Fera specialises in the sciences underpinning agriculture for sustainable crop production, environmental management and conservation and in food safety and quality. Fera has statutory responsibilities for delivering policy and inspectorate functions in relation to Plant Health, Bee Health and Plant Varieties and Seeds. Fera is part of the UK capability to respond to, and recover from, emergency situations, including accidental or deliberate release of hazardous materials.

== Structure ==
It also houses FAPAS (international food analysis proficiency testing services) and the National Collection of Plant Pathogenic Bacteria.

== See also ==
- National Bee Unit
