= Nectar source =

Flowering plant that produces nectar

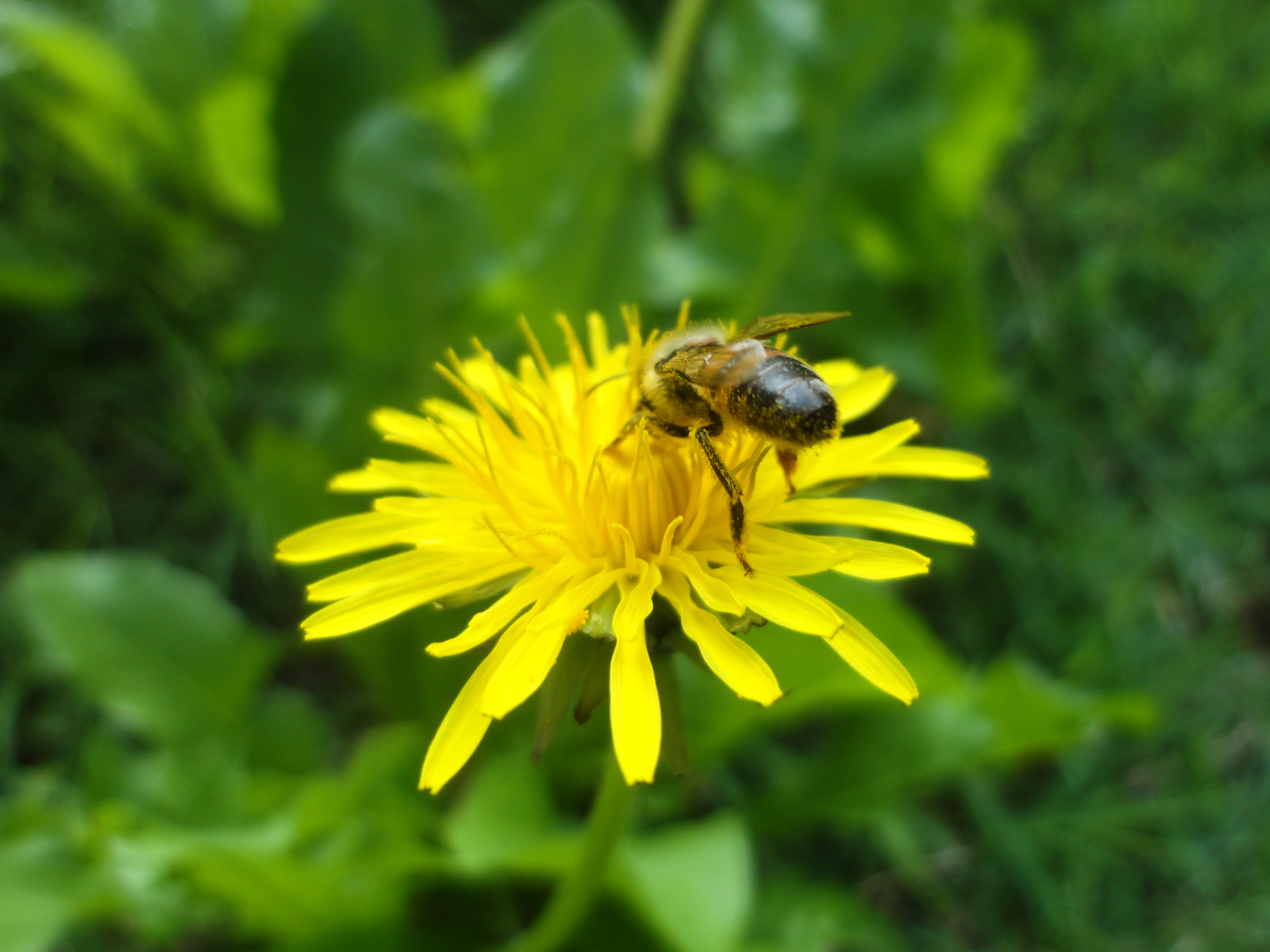
A Western honey bee pollinating a dandelion

A nectar source is a flowering plant that produces nectar as part of its reproductive strategy. These plants create nectar, which attract pollinating insects and sometimes other animals such as birds.

Nectar source plants are important for beekeeping, as well as in agriculture and horticulture. Their use is particularly important for organic agriculture and organic horticulture, where they serve not only to attract pollinators for crops, but also provide habitat for beneficial insects and other animals that provide pest control.

In gardens, nectar sources are often provided to attract butterflies and hummingbirds as well.

== For honey bees ==
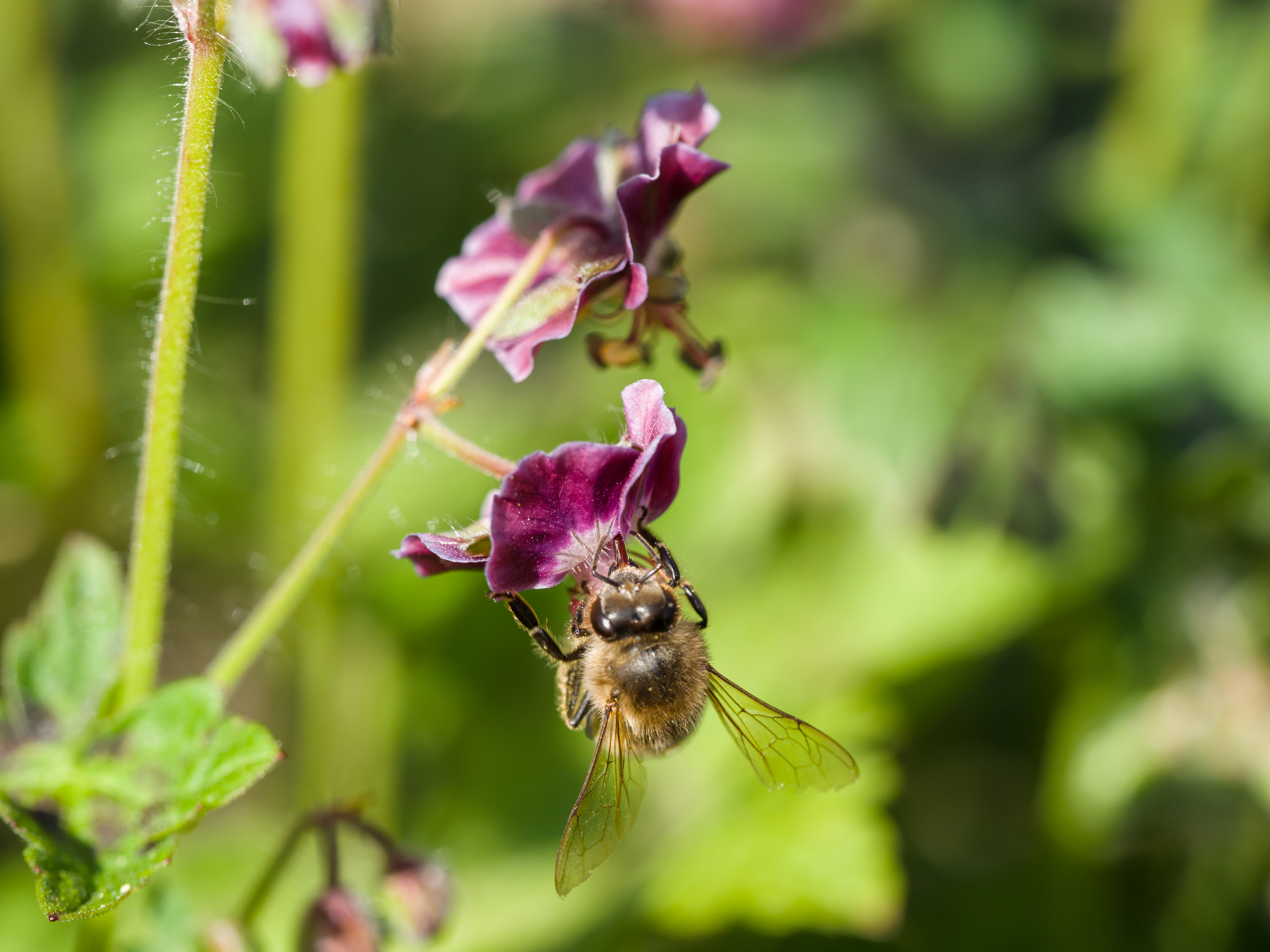
Bee gathering nectar

While many plants produce nectar, beekeepers prefer to place their hives near certain plants, for the qualities of the honey produced. Certain agricultural crops, such as clover and buckwheat, are used to make specific honeys, which often command a premium price.

Some plants are avoided by some beekeepers (and sought out by others) due to substances found in the nectar. For example, honey made from the nectar of rhododendrons ("mad honey") contains chemicals that cause light-headedness, hallucinations and are believed by some to improve sexual performance. In slightly larger quantities "mad honey" is toxic, and shopkeepers are careful how they sell it.

== For pollinators ==
Pollinating insects, including honey bees and many other insects, are a necessary element when growing most crops (though cereal grain crops are wind-pollinated). By maintaining a constant supply of nectar in areas adjacent to a field or vegetable garden throughout the growing season, farmers and gardeners ensure that their crops can be pollinated when they flower.

== For beneficial insects ==
Particularly organic horticulture and organic farming, nectar sources are maintained to attract and maintain a population of beneficial insects. Insects such as predatory wasps, hoverflies and lacewings feed on nectar as adults, while their larval forms are predatory and feed on garden pests.

== For butterflies and hummingbirds ==
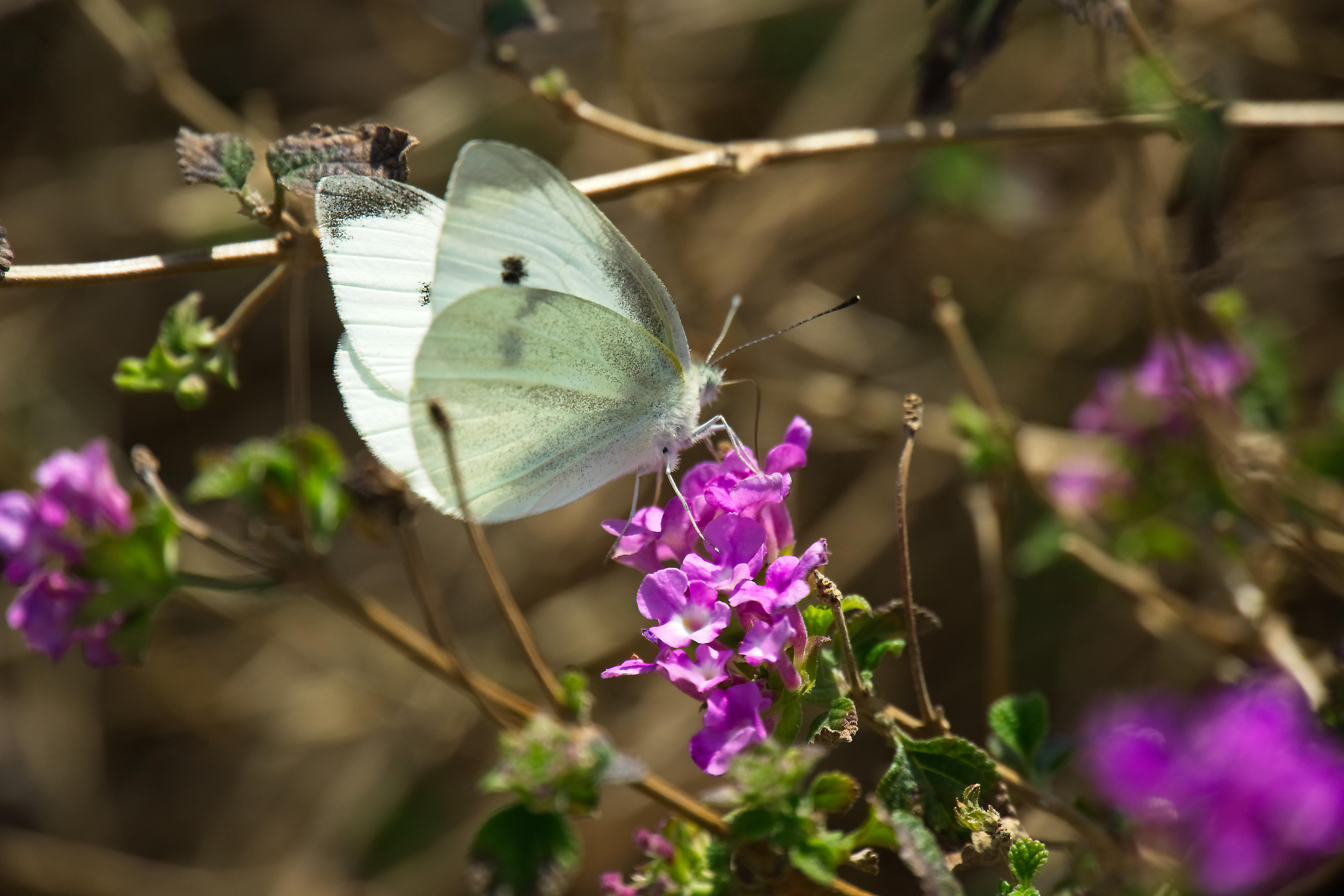
Butterflies collecting nectar

In gardens, the presence of butterflies and hummingbirds is often encouraged. Butterflies are attracted by most good nectar sources, though there are particular plants they seem to prefer. Certain plants are also grown as a food source for their caterpillars.

Hummingbirds feed on tubular flowers, using their long, siphoning beaks. Many plants in the mint family, Lamiaceae, are used to attract hummingbirds.

== See also ==
- Forage (honeybee)
- Honeydew source
- List of honey plants
- Melliferous flower
- Pollen source
- Regional honeys
