= List of pollen sources =

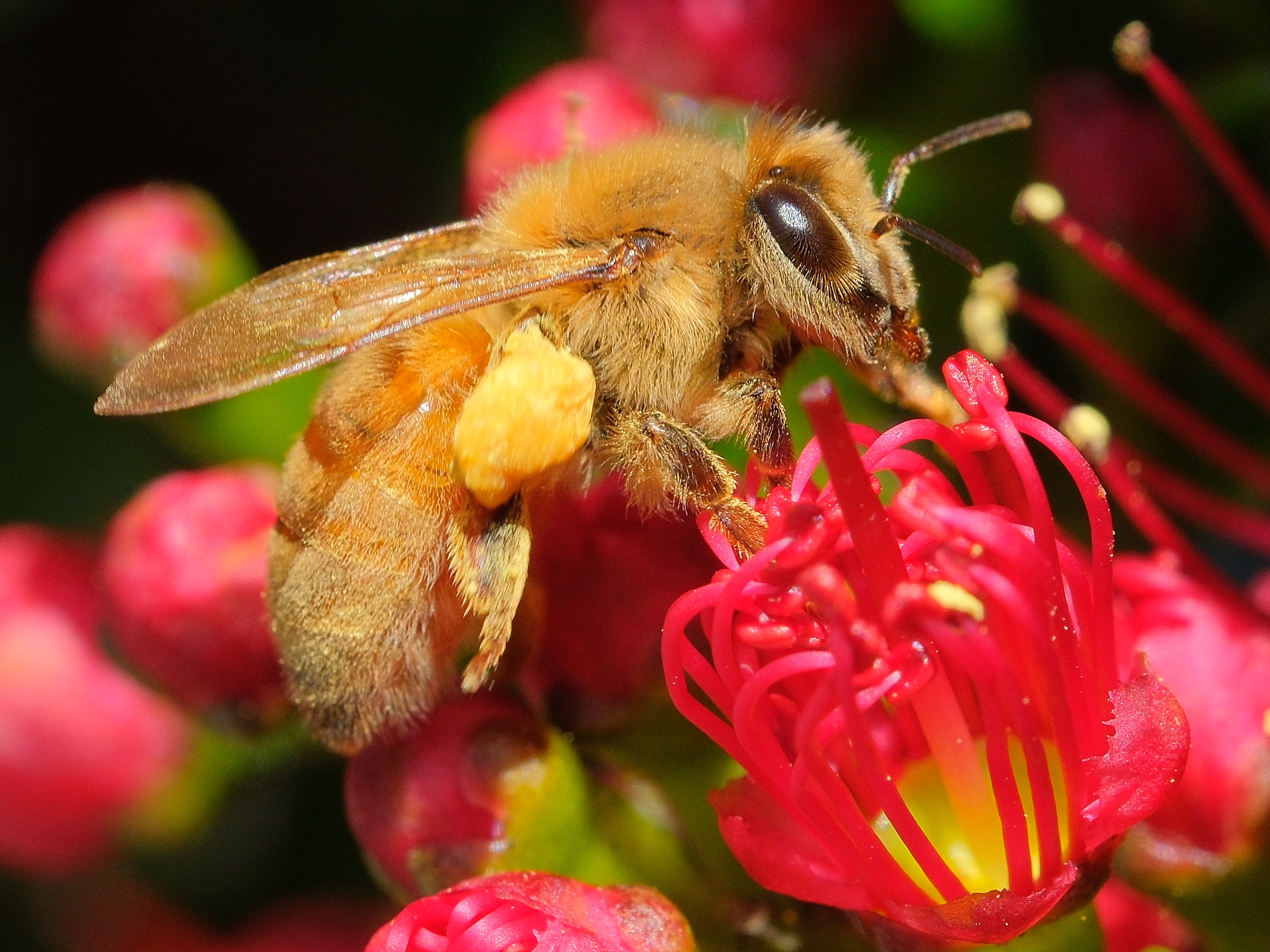
Bee collecting pollen from rata

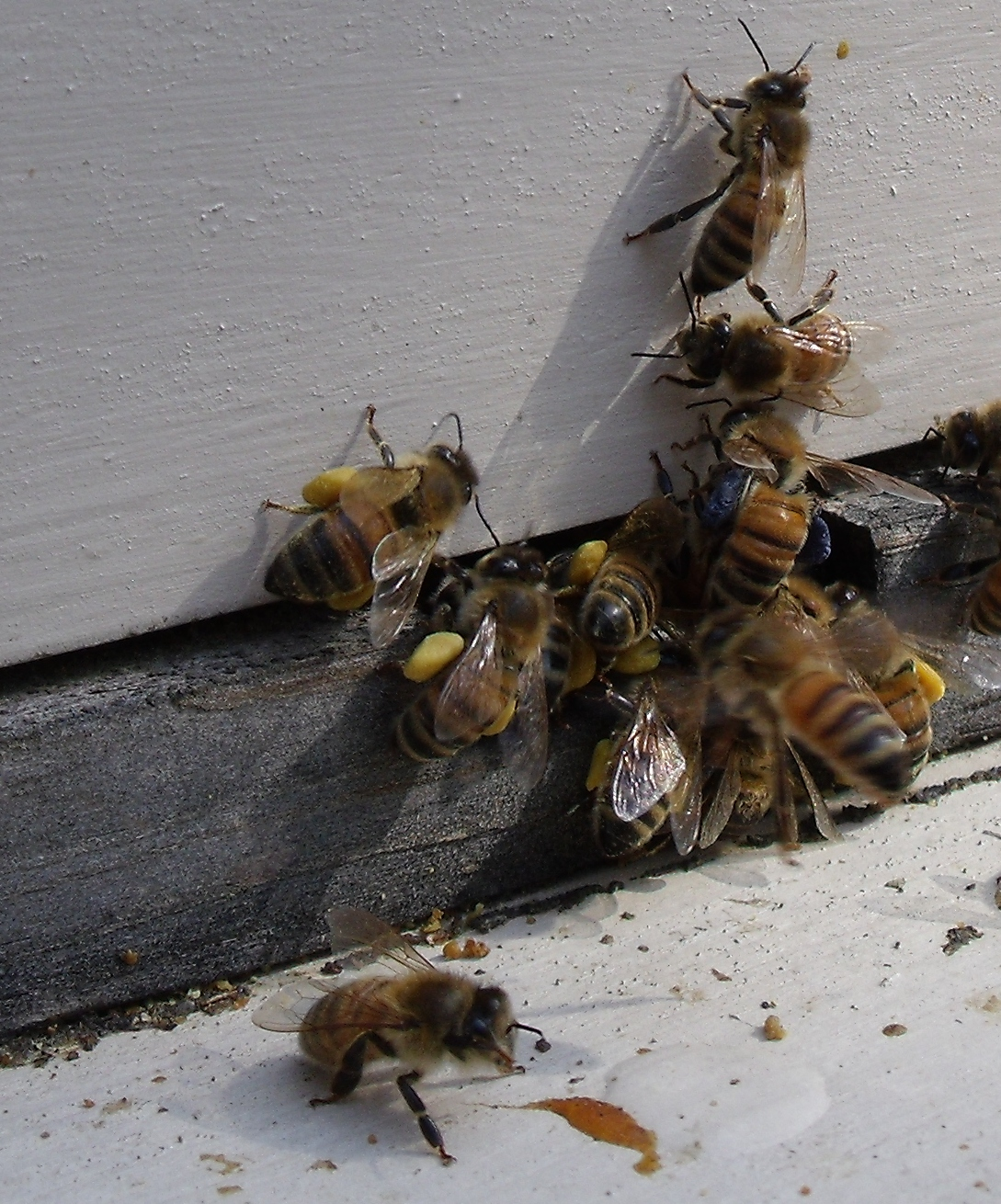
Pollen-laden bees at hive entrance

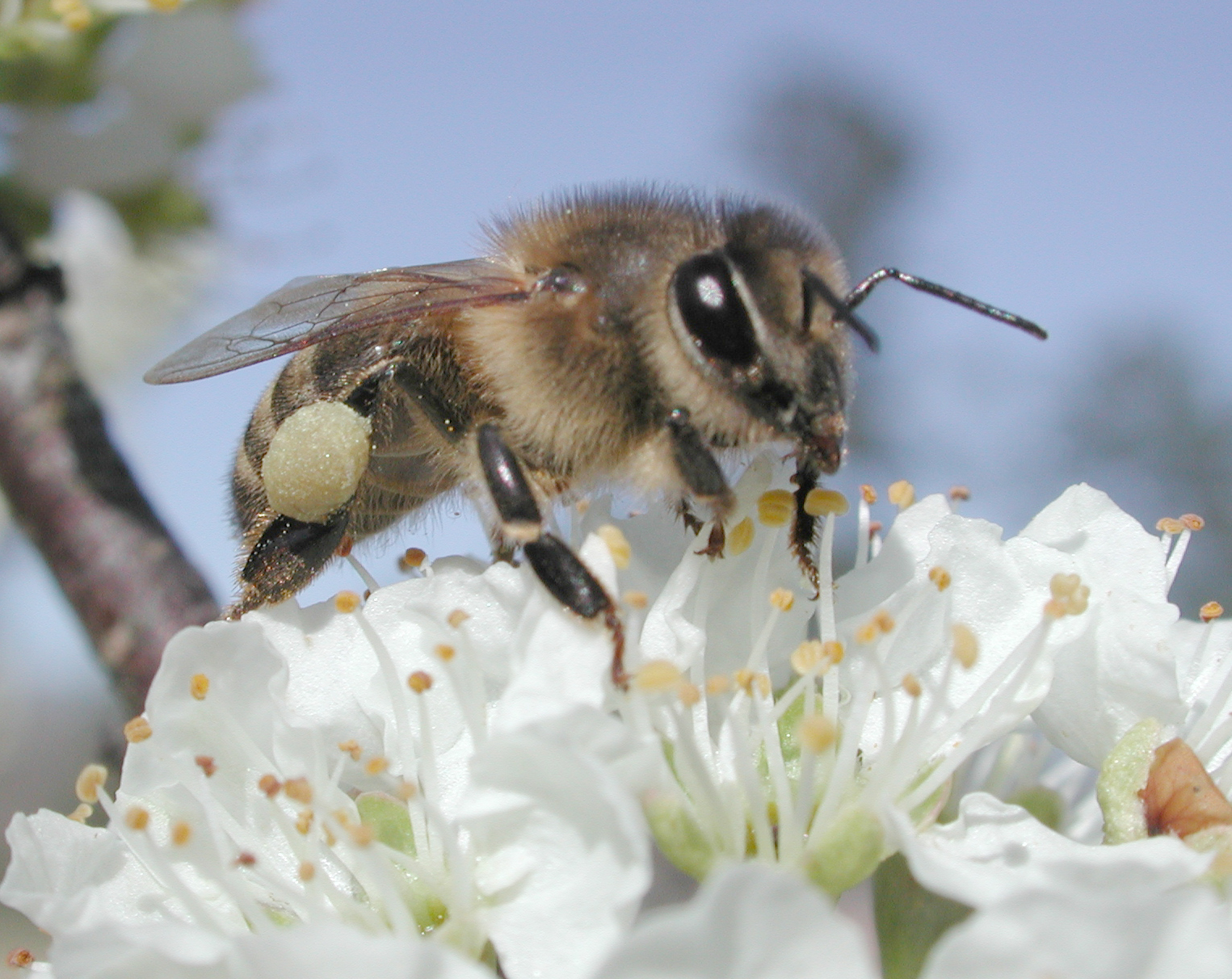
Bee on plum tree with pollen

The term pollen source is often used in the context of beekeeping and refers to flowering plants as a source of pollen for bees or other insects. Bees collect pollen as a protein source to raise their brood. For the plant, the pollinizer, this can be an important mechanism for sexual reproduction, as the pollinator distributes its pollen. Few flowering plants self-pollinate; some can provide their own pollen (self fertile), but require a pollinator to move the pollen; others are dependent on cross pollination from a genetically different source of viable pollen, through the activity of pollinators. One of the possible pollinators to assist in cross-pollination are honeybees. The article below is mainly about the pollen source from a beekeeping perspective.

The pollen source in a given area depends on the type of vegetation present and the length of their bloom period. What type of vegetation will grow in an area depends on soil texture, soil pH, soil drainage, daily maximum and minimum temperatures, precipitation, extreme minimum winter temperature, and growing degree days. The plants listed below are plants that would grow in USDA Hardiness zone 5. A good predictor for when a plant will bloom and produce pollen is a calculation of the growing degree days.

The color of pollen below indicates the color as it appears when the pollen arrives at the beehive. After arriving to the colony with a fresh load of pollen, the honey bee unloads its pollen from the pollen basket located on its hind legs. The worker bees in the colony mix dry pollen with nectar and/or honey with their enzymes, and naturally occurring yeast from the air. Workers then compact the pollen. storing each variety in an individual wax hexagonal cell (honeycomb), typically located within their bee brood nest. This creates a fermented pollen mix call beekeepers call 'bee bread'. Dry pollen, is a food source for bees, which may contain 16–30% protein, 1–10% fat, 1–7% starch, many vitamins, some micro nutrients, and possibly a little sugar. The protein source needed for rearing one worker bee from larval to adult stage requires approximately 120 to 145 mg of pollen. An average bee colony will collect about 20 to 57 kg (44 to 125 pounds) of pollen a year.

== Spring ==
=== Trees and shrubs – Spring ===
| Common name | Latin name | Blooming months | Pollen color | Availability | Source for honeybees |
|---|---|---|---|---|---|
| Maples | Acer spp. | Feb – Apr | light yellow | feral | fair |
| Manitoba maple (Box elder) | Acer negundo | Feb – Apr | light olive | feral | good |
| Norway maple | Acer platanoides | Apr – May | yellow green, olive | feral | fair |
| Red maple | Acer rubrum | Mar – Apr | grey brown | feral | |
| Grey alder | Alnus incana | Feb – Apr | brownish yellow | feral | |
| American chestnut | Castanea dentata | May – Jun | | mostly ornamental | |
| Sweet chestnut | Castanea sativa | May | | feral | good |
| Common hackberry | Celtis occidentalis | Apr – May | | feral | |
| Flowering quince | Chaenomeles japonica, Chaenomeles lagenaria, Chaenomeles speciosa 'Nivalis', Chaenomeles x superba | Apr – May | | feral | good |
| American hazel | Corylus americana | Mar – Apr | light green | feral and ornamental | fair/good |
| Hawthorns | Crataegus spp. | Apr – May | yellow brown | feral | fair |
| White ash | Fraxinus americana | Apr – May | | | |
| Honey locust | Gleditsia triancanthos | May – Jun | | feral | |
| American holly | Ilex opaca | Apr – Jun | | feral | |
| Walnuts | Juglans spp. | Apr – May | | cultivated | fair |
| Tulip tree | Liriodendron tulipifera | May – Jun | cream | feral and ornamental | good |
| Crab apples | Malus spp. | Mar – Jun | light olive | ornamental | |
| Apples | Malus domestica, Malus sylvestris | Apr – May | yellow white | cultivated and ornamental | very good |
| American sycamore | Platanus occidentalis | Apr – May | light olive | feral | |
| Plum | Prunus spp. | Apr – May | light grey, grey | ornamental and cultivated | |
| Almond | Prunus amygdalus | Feb | light brown to brown pollen – not considered a good pollen source but bees are the primary pollinator | cultivated mostly in California | fair |
| Wild cherry | Prunus avium | Apr – May | yellow brown, light brown | feral | very good |
| Cherry plum | Prunus cerasifera | | light brown to brown | feral | fair |
| Sour cherry | Prunus cerasus | Apr – May | dark yellow | ornamental and cultivated | very good |
| Peach | Prunus persica | Apr – May | reddish yellow | ornamental and cultivated | good |
| Black cherry | Prunus serotina | Apr – May | | feral | minor |
| Blackthorn | Prunus spinosa | Mar – May | firebrick | feral | good |
| Pear | Pyrus communis | Apr – May | red yellow | ornamental and cultivated | good |
| Oaks | Quercus robur, Quercus pedunculata | May | light olive | feral | minor |
| Black locust | Robinia pseudoacacia | May – Jun | | feral | |
| Blackberry | Rubus spp. | May – Jun | light grey | feral and cultivated | |
| Raspberry | Rubus idaeus | May – Jun | white grey | feral and cultivated | good |
| Willows | Salix spp. | Feb – Apr | lemon | feral | good |
| White willow | Salix alba | | | feral | good |
| Goat willow | Salix caprea | Mar – Apr | | feral | very good |
| Violet willow | Salix daphnoides | Mar – Apr | | feral | very good |
| Pussy willow | Salix discolor | Mar – Apr | | feral and ornamental | |
| Basket willow | Salix purpurea | Mar – Apr | | feral | very good |
| Silky leaf osier, Smith's willow | Salix gmelinii | Apr – May | | | very good |
| American mountain ash | Sorbus americana | May-Jun | | feral | |
| American elm | Ulmus americana | Feb – Apr | light grey | feral | |
| Winged elm | Ulmus alata | Feb – Mar | pale yellow | feral | good |
| European field elm | Ulmus minor | | | feral | good |

==== Gallery ====
Flying honeybee with red pollen in pollen basket, likely on henbit

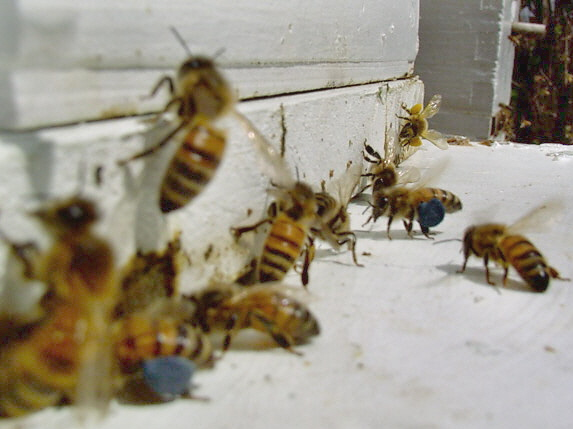
Bees in April with blue Siberian squill pollen in pollen basket

Honeybees in May with red (likely Horse chestnut) pollen in pollen basket

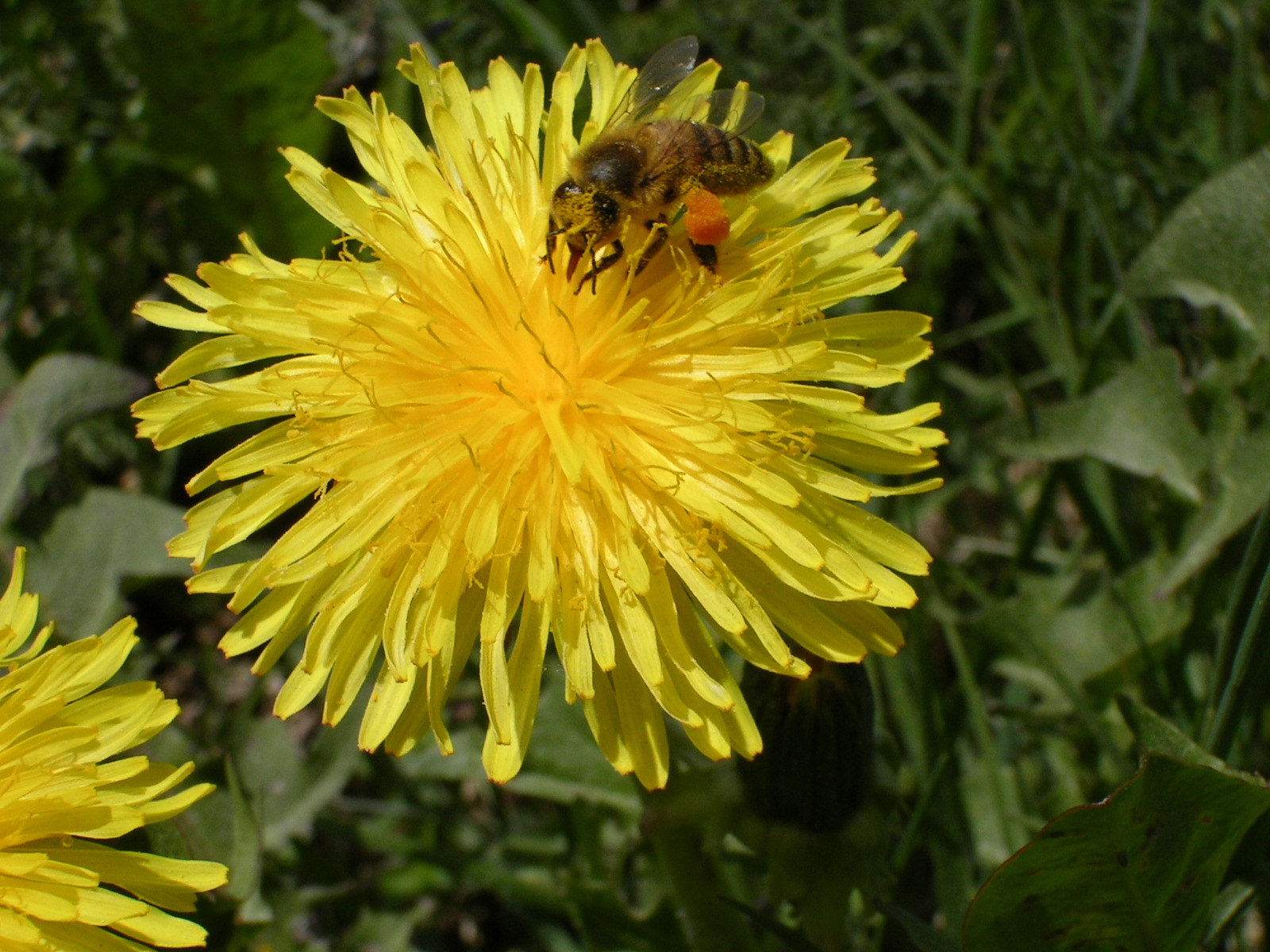
Dandelion pollen

=== Flowers and annual crop plants – Spring ===
| Common name | Latin name | Blooming months | Pollen color | Availability | Source for honeybees |
|---|---|---|---|---|---|
| Ajuga (Bronze Bugle, Common Bugle) | Ajuga reptans | mid spring | | | |
| Chives | Allium schoenoprasum | May – Sep | | cultivated? | |
| Asparagus | Asparagus officinalis | May – Jun | bright orange | cultivated | |
| Mustard plants | Brassica rapa | Apr – May | lemon | cultivated and feral | |
| Canola (Oilseed Rape) | Brassica napus | May – Jun | lemon | extensively cultivated | very good |
| Yellow Crocus | Crocus vernus (syn. Crocus aureus) | April | orange yellow | feral and ornamental | fair |
| Leopard's Bane | Doronicum cordatum | Apr – May | | | |
| Winter aconite | Eranthis hyemalis | Mar – Apr | yellow | feral and ornamental | good |
| Snowdrop | Galanthus nivalis | Mar – Apr | orange, red | | fair |
| Henbit | Lamium amplexicaule | April | orange red, red, purplish red | Apr – Jul | poor |
| Common Mallow | Malva sp. | Apr – Sep | mauve | feral | good |
| White Sweet Clover | Melilotus alba | May – Aug | yellow to dark yellow | feral and cultivated | good |
| Yellow Sweet Clover | Melilotus officinalis | May – Aug | yellow to dark yellow | feral and cultivated | |
| Sainfoin | Onobrychis viciifolia | May – Jul | yellow brown | | very good |
| Siberian squill | Scilla siberica | Mar – Apr | steel blue | feral and ornamental | good |
| White mustard | Sinapis alba | June | lemon | feral and cultivated | good |
| Chick weed | Stellaria media | Apr – Jul | yellowish | feral | minor |
| Dandelions | Taraxacum officinale | Apr – May | red yellow, orange | feral | very good |
| Gorse | Ulex europaeus | Mar – Dec | light firebrick | feral | good |

== Summer ==
=== Trees and shrubs – Summer ===
| Common name | Latin name | Blooming months | Pollen color | Availability | Source for honeybees |
|---|---|---|---|---|---|
| Red Horse chestnut | Aesculus × carnea | | raisin | feral | |
| Horse chestnut | Aesculus hippocastanum | May – Jun after 80-110 growing degree days. | anatolia | feral | good |
| Southern Catalpa | Catalpa bignonioides | Jun – Jul | | ornamental | fair |
| Northern Catalpa | Catalpa speciosa | Jun – Jul | | ornamental | |
| Bluebeards | Caryopteris × clandonensis 'Heavenly Blue' | Aug – Sep | | | very good |
| Virginia creeper | Parthenocissus quinquefolia | Jul – Aug | | | good |
| Boston ivy 'Veitchii' | Parthenocissus tricuspidata 'Veitchii' | Jun – Jul | | | good |
| Sumacs | Rhus glabra | Jun – Jul | | | |
| Elder | Sambucus canadensis | Jun – Jul | canary yellow | | |
| Basswood or American linden | Tilia americana | Jun – Jul | yellow to light orange | feral and ornamental | very good |
| Little leaf linden | Tilia cordata | very good | citrine | feral | |
| Blueberry | Vaccinium myrtilloides | Jun | red yellow, orange | cultivated | poor |

=== Flowers and annual crop plants – Summer ===
| Common name | Latin name | Blooming months | Pollen color | Availability | Source for honeybees |
|---|---|---|---|---|---|
| Allium | Allium spp. | | | feral and cultivated | |
| Onion | Allium cepa | | light olive | cultivated | |
| Chives | Allium schoenoprasum | May – Sep | | feral and cultivated | |
| Garlic chives | Allium tuberosum | Aug – Sep | | feral and cultivated | |
| Leadwort syn. Indigobush | Amorpha fruticosa | Jun – Jul | | ornamental? | |
| Aster | Aster spp. | Sep-Frost | reddish yellow | feral and ornamental | |
| Land-in-blue, Bushy Aster | Symphyotrichum dumosum | Aug – Sep | bronze yellow | feral | |
| Borage | Borago officinalis | Jun – Frost | blueish grey | ornamental | |
| Pot marigold | Calendula officinalis | Jun – Sep | orange | | |
| Heather sp. | Calluna vulgaris | Jul – Aug | yellow white, white | | good |
| Hemp | Cannabis sativa | Aug | yellow green | | good source |
| Blue Thistle | Carduus spp. | | | | |
| Star thistle | Centaurea spp. | Jul – Sep | | | |
| Persian centaurea | Psephellus dealbatus | | hemp | | |
| Knapweed | Centaurea macrocephala | Jul – Aug | | | good |
| Lesser knapweed | Centaurea nigra | | very light olive | | |
| Chicory | Cichorium intybus | | white | | |
| Cotoneasters | Cotoneaster spp. | | | | good |
| Cucumber | Cucumis spp. | | pale yellow | cultivated | |
| Melons | Cucumis melo | Jun-Frost | pale yellow | cultivated | |
| Pumpkin | Cucurbita pepo | Jun-Frost | bright yellow | cultivated | |
| Fireweed, rosebay willowherb | Chamaenerion angustifolium | Jul – Aug | blue | feral | |
| Joe-Pye weed, Bluestem | Eutrochium spp.; Eupatorium purpureum | Aug – Sep | bistre green | | |
| Buckwheat | Fagopyrum esculentum | Jul – Aug | light yellow to light green | cultivated | good source |
| Blue vine | Gonolobus laevis syn. Cynanchum laeve | | | | |
| Sunflower | Helianthus annuus | Jun – Sep | golden | feral and cultivated | |
| Jewelweeds | Impatiens capensis | | yellowish white | | |
| Alyssum | Lobularia maritima | Jun – Sep | | | |
| Lupin | Lupinus sp. | Jun – Jul | white, yellow or blue | | minor |
| Mallow | Malva sylvestris | Jun – Sep | | | |
| Alfalfa | Medicago sativa | July – Aug | khaki | feral and cultivated | |
| Clover | Melilotus spp. and Trifolium spp. | May – Aug | | feral and cultivated | |
| White Sweet Clover | Melilotus alba | | auburn | feral and cultivated | |
| Yellow Sweet Clover | Melilotus officinalis | | auburn | feral and cultivated | |
| Basil | Ocimum basilicum | | white | ornamental | |
| Poppies | Papaver orientale | May – Jul | blueish grey | ornamental only | good source |
| Opium poppy | Papaver somniferum | May – Jun | grey | feral and ornamental | very good source |
| Phacelia | Phacelia tanacetifolia | Jun – Sep | navy blue | feral and cultivated | good source |
| Smartweed | Polygonum spp. | Aug – Sep | | | |
| Common chickweed | Stellaria media | Apr – Jul | | | minor source |
| Germander | Teucrium chamaedrys | Jul – Aug | | | |
| Alsike clover | Trifolium hybridum | | yellow brown | | good source |
| Crimson clover | Trifolium incarnatum | | dark brown | | |
| White clover | Trifolium repens | Jun – Jul | caledonian brown | | good source |
| Cat-tail | Typha latifolia | Jun – Jul | | | |
| Cow vetch | Vicia cracca | Jul – Aug | | | |
| Garden vetch | Vicia sativa | Jul – Aug | | | |
| Sweet corn | Zea mays | Jun – Jul | yellowish white | cultivated | |

== Fall ==
=== Trees and shrubs – Fall ===
| Common name | Latin name | Blooming months | Pollen color | Availability | Source for honeybees |
|---|---|---|---|---|---|
| Chinese elm, Lacebark elm | Ulmus parvifolia | Aug – Sep | | ornamental | good |

=== Flowers and annual crop plants – Fall ===
| Common name | Latin name | Blooming months | Pollen color | Availability | Source for honeybees |
|---|---|---|---|---|---|
| Aster | Aster spp. | Sep-Frost | reddish yellow | | |
| Borage | Borago officinalis | Jun – Frost | | | |
| Melons | Cucumis melo | Jun-Frost | | cultivated | |
| Sweet autumn clematis | Clematis terniflora | late Sept | white | ornamental | |
| Pumpkin | Cucurbita pepo | Jun-Frost | bright yellow | cultivated | |
| Ivy | Hedera spp. | Sep – Oct | dull yellow or black? | feral and ornamental | |
| Goldenrod | Solidago spp. | Sep – Oct | golden | feral | |

== See also ==
- Forage (honey bee)
- List of honey plants
- Melliferous flower
- Nectar source
