= ADAS (company) =

UK-based consulting company

- Industry: Environmental consultancy and services
- Founded: 1997
- Headquarters: UK
- Revenue: c.£31m
- Number of employees: 450+ (2014)
- Website: https://www.adas.co.uk/

ADAS is a UK-based independent agricultural and environmental consultancy and provider of rural development and policy advice.

== History ==
The UK's National Agricultural Advisory Service (NAAS) was established in 1946 as the advisory and research arm of the Ministry of Agriculture, Fisheries and Food (MAFF) due to harsh food rationing of World War II that continued in the UK into the early 1950s. Plant pathology, entomology, soil and other specialist advisers throughout the country advised farmers and growers how to maximise their output.

The NAAS was rebranded as the Agricultural Development Advisory Service (ADAS) in 1971. In 1992, ADAS became an Executive Agency of MAFF until the business was privatised in 1997.

A collection of drainage tiles used in underground water management were donated to The Museum of English Rural Life in 1994.

In 2016 the business, operating assets and employees of ADAS were acquired by environmental consultancy, RSK Group.

== Operations ==
ADAS operates from 16 principal UK sites. It employs over 400 staff on permanent or fixed-term contracts and calls on a further 250 on contingent terms. Its customers range from small rural enterprises to major corporations, government departments, and agencies.

Previous projects include:

- Developing a stud farm carbon calculator for the Thoroughbred Breeders Association (November 2023).
- Investigating shelf-life extension options for tomatoes in Nigeria
- Developing an integrated pest management (IPM) tool to help farmers create crop specific IPM plans
- Creating a carbon calculator for the horticulture sector
