= Ingredient =

Part of a mixture

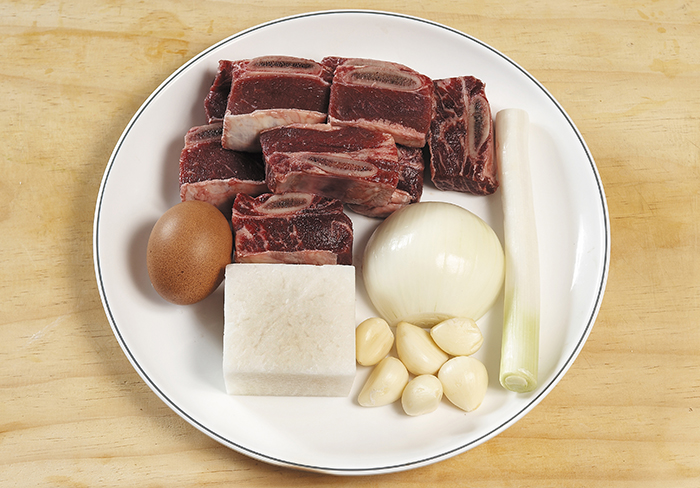
Ingredients for short rib soup

In a general sense, an ingredient is a substance which forms part of a mixture. In cooking, recipes specify which ingredients are used to prepare a dish, and the term may also refer to a specific food item in relation to its use in different recipes. Many commercial products contain secret ingredients purported to make them better than competing products. In the pharmaceutical industry, an active ingredient is the ingredient in a formulation which invokes biological activity.

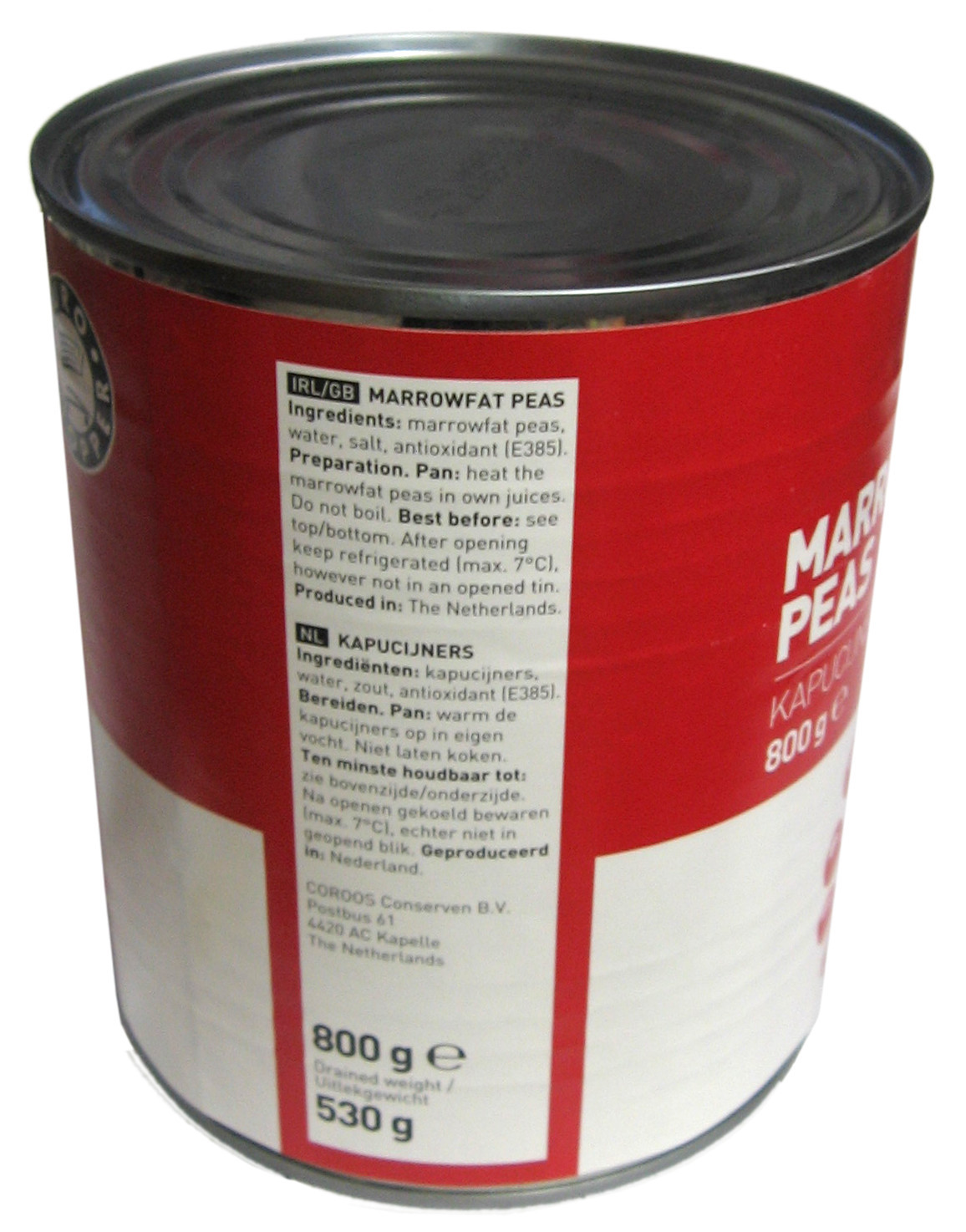
The ingredient list on a can of marrowfat peas. Besides peas, the product also contains water, salt, and the antioxidant E385.

National laws usually require prepared food products to display a list of ingredients and specifically require that certain additives be listed. In the European Union, food labeling regulations also mandate that allergens such as nuts, milk, and gluten be clearly emphasized within the ingredient list to protect consumers. Furthermore, regulations enforced by agencies such as the United States Food and Drug Administration (FDA) mandate that ingredients need to be listed in descending order of predominance by weight. This structural requirement ensures that the ingredients present in the greatest quantity appear first, allowing consumers to accurately assess the primary composition of a product.

== Etymology ==
The word ingredient entered English in the early 15th century, originally also appearing as engredient, meaning "something forming part of a mixture." It derives from Middle French ingrédient, which in turn comes from Latin ingredien(t)-, the present participle of ingredī ("to go in, enter"). The Latin verb is formed from in- ("in, into") and gradī ("to step, go"), linked to the Proto-Indo-European root *\*ghredh-* ("to walk, go").

== History of ingredients in cooking ==
=== Prehistoric ===
Although early humans foraged and hunted a diverse range of foods, paleolithic diets were originally believed to consist of simple single ingredient recipes, but more recent evidence seems to contradict this. A study by the University of Liverpool found evidence of complex food recipes in Palaeolithic remains dating back 40-70,000 years ago, such as cooked flatbreads, soaked and pounded pulses, and mixes of nuts, herbs and grains. The current earliest definitive evidence of the use of spices in cooking is mustard seed residues on pots used for cooking from 5000 BC that were found in sites in Germany and Denmark.

Salt is an essential nutrient and naturally occurring, and so it's use would already have been widespread by the earliest humans. The earliest known evidence of deliberate salt production dates to 6000 BC Romania. The increase in production may indicate a transition to its use as a flavour enhancer and preservative.

=== The agricultural revolution ===
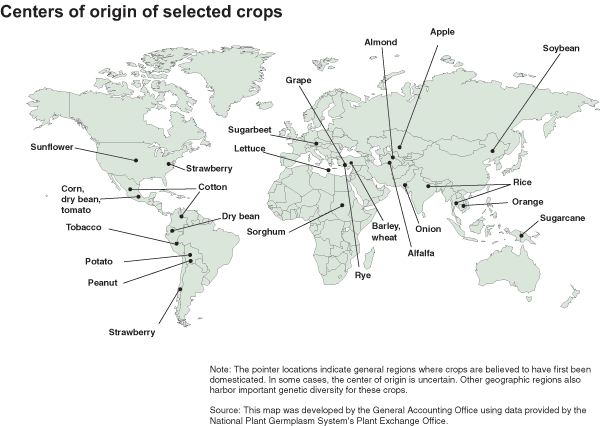
This map shows the sites of domestication for a number of crops. Places where crops were initially domesticated are called centers of origin

The First Agricultural Revolution, also known as the Neolithic Revolution, was the wide-scale transition of many human cultures during the Neolithic period in Afro-Eurasia from a lifestyle of hunting and gathering to one of agriculture and settlement.

There were different geographic centers of agricultural origin each domesticating distinct local plants.

While the agricultural revolution initially decreased the nutrition and diversity of ingredients in peoples diets through over reliance on staple foods, the development of sedentary civilisations facilitated increasingly complex networks of trade routes that enabled the spread of non-regionally specific foods.

=== After the agricultural revolution ===
The oldest known written recipes are found in a collection of Babylonian cuneiform tablets stored in Yale University that date to 1730 BC. The recipes include pies, stews and breads and contain a variety of ingredients including coriander, garlic, milk, blood and cooked rodents.

Various religions forbid the consumption of certain types of food. For example, Judaism prescribes a set of rules, called kashrut, regarding what may and may not be eaten, and notably forbidding the mixing of meat with dairy products. Islam has similar laws, dividing foods into haram (forbidden) and halal (permitted). Jains often follow religious directives to observe vegetarianism. Some Hindus do not eat beef, and some Hindus, especially those from the upper castes, consider vegetarianism as ideal and practise forms of vegetarianism.

The spice trade involved historical civilizations in Asia, Northeast Africa and Europe. Spices, such as cinnamon, cassia, cardamom, ginger, pepper, nutmeg, star anise, clove, and turmeric, were known and used in antiquity and traded in the Eastern world. These spices found their way into the Near East before the beginning of the Christian era, with fantastic tales hiding their true sources.

The maritime aspect of the trade was dominated by the Austronesian peoples in Southeast Asia, namely the ancient Indonesian sailors who established routes from Southeast Asia to Sri Lanka and India, and later China, by 1500 BC. These goods were then transported by land toward the Mediterranean and the Greco-Roman world via the incense route and the Roman–India routes by India and Persia traders. Nutmeg, a spice produced only on the Banda islands of Indonesia, had spread to be used in Constantinople by the 6th century through Indian Ocean trade.

The diversity of culinary ingredients increased rapidly after the European colonization of the Americas due to the Colombian exchange, which led to the globalisation of now ubiquitous New World crops such as tomatoes, chillies, coco, peanuts and potatoes; in addition it led to the spread of old world ingredients to the Americas such as wheat and bananas.

During the late medieval period in Europe, standardised regulations began to develop about the quality and type of ingredients that could be used in traditional recipes. A notable example is the 1516 Reinheitsgebot law of Bavaria, which forbade the use of any ingredients other than water, barley, hops and yeast in the brewing of beer.

=== Industrial Revolution ===
During the Industrial Revolution, food began to be adultered with an increasing variety of synthetically derived ingredients such as non-nutrient dyes, flavour enhancers and preservatives. An 1820 book by the chemist Frederick Accum, discusses means of detecting adulterated ingredients in food including lead, alum, strychnine, sawdust and clay. This accelerated rapidly in the 20th century with the development of petrochemically derived synthetic ingredients such as benzoates, sorbates, and xylitol.

== Ingredients by type ==
Vegetables are edible parts of plants that are consumed by humans or other animals as food. This original meaning is still commonly used, and is applied to plants collectively to refer to all edible plant matter, including flowers, fruits, stems, leaves, roots, and seeds. An alternative definition is applied somewhat arbitrarily, often by culinary and cultural tradition; it may include savoury fruits such as tomatoes and squash, flowers such as broccoli, and seeds such as pulses, but exclude foods derived from some plants that are fruits, flowers, nuts, and cereal grains.

In the culinary arts, a spice is a seed, fruit, root, bark, or other plant substance primarily used for flavouring or colouring food. Spices are distinguished from herbs, which are the leaves, flowers, or stems of plants used for flavouring or as a garnish. Spices and herbs are both seasonings. Spices are sometimes used in medicine, religious rituals, cosmetics, or perfume production. They are usually classified into spices, spice seeds, and herbal categories. For example, vanilla is commonly used as an ingredient in fragrance manufacturing. Plant-based sweeteners such as sugar are not considered spices.

In the context of nutrition, red meat is defined as meat obtained from mammals, including beef, pork, lamb, mutton, veal, venison, and goat. Red meat does not necessarily appear red in color. Studies on the long-term health effects of meat often use the term white meat for poultry, including chicken and turkey. Some sources use the term white meat for both poultry and fish, and others exclude fish.

In culinary contexts, the term white meat is often used more narrowly to refer to only certain cuts of poultry, particularly the breast and wings. Chicken legs and thighs are referred to as dark meat in these contexts.

- Edible plants
  - List of culinary fruits
  - List of culinary herbs and spices
    - Spice mix
  - List of culinary nuts
  - List of edible cacti
  - List of edible flowers
  - List of edible seeds
  - List of forageable plants – Edible wild plants
  - List of leaf vegetables
  - Edible plant stem
  - List of root vegetables
  - List of vegetables
- Edible mushroom
- Yeast
- Edible seaweed
- Animal source foods
  - Seafood
    - Fish
    - Shellfish
  - Insects
  - Meat
  - Honey
  - List of dairy products
  - Eggs
- Salt
- List of condiments
- List of syrups

Nova classification classifies food into four groups:

1. Unprocessed or minimally processed foods
2. Processed culinary ingredients
3. Processed foods
4. Ultra-processed foods

== Regional ingredients in cooking ==
Ingredients can be more common to cuisines of certain countries.

- Thai ingredients
- Korean ingredients
- Vietnamese ingredients
- Burmese ingredients
- Japanese ingredients
- Pakistani spices and condiments
- Australian herbs and spices
- Philippine condiments
- Indian condiments, spices and plants
- Bangladeshi spices

== Substitute ingredients ==
- Sugar substitute
- Meat alternative
- Egg substitutes
- Milk substitute
- Cheese alternative
- Plant cream
- Artificial rice
- Cocoa-free chocolate alternative
- Coffee substitute
- Fat substitute
- Salt substitute
- Vegan honey

== Nomenclature of ingredients ==
The same ingredient can appear under different names in different contexts. A culinary name is used in culinary contexts; a common name is used in general everyday life; binomial nomenclature is used for scientific naming of species. For example the species Bos taurus is commonaly called cattle but the meat has the culinary name beef. Cuts of meat vary by culinary tradition as well as by meat like pork, beef or lamb and mutton.

Culinary names might depend on region.

Food additives can just be listed through its E number in Europe or through the related International Numbering System for Food Additives.

Drug nomenclature is the systematic naming of drugs, especially pharmaceutical drugs. In general, drugs have 3 types of names: chemical names, for which IUPAC nomenclature is the most accepted naming system; nonproprietary (generic) names, for which the international nonproprietary name (INN) system is the most accepted naming system; and trade names, which are brand names used for marketing and selling drugs.

== Standards and certifications ==
Products can have legal requirements to be sold or when marketed in certain ways. Additionally, products can be certified when they meet quality standards of certain organizations.

To qualify for some label it might be necessary for all or subset of ingredients to meet the same standard or quality. For example, vegan food must be made from vegan ingredients but a low sugar food might contain some ingredients that have a high sugar content.

The Codex Alimentarius is a collection of internationally recognized standards, codes of practice, guidelines, and other recommendations published by the Food and Agriculture Organization (FAO) and World Health Organization (WHO) of the United Nations relating to food, food production, food labeling, and food safety.

As products can themselves become ingredients of more derived products some examples of standards, certifications and legal requirements are provided:

- Organic certification
- Sustainability standards and certification
- Fair-trade certification
- (Food) safety
  - Certain types of testing or lack thereof (no animal testing)
  - presence or absence of allergens
  - otherwise medically problematic ingredients for sensitive individuals such as gluten or lactose
- Vegetarian and vegan
- Accordance with religious requirements such as halal and kosher food
- Alcohol
- Country of origin
- Protected designation of origin
- Product labels can require meeting certain legal definitions and quality standards
  - in some markets fruit preserves and jams have different minimum fruit contents
  - Reinheitsgebot
- Nutrition facts label

== Food additive ==
Food additives are substances added to food to preserve flavor or enhance taste, appearance, or other sensory qualities. Some additives, such as vinegar (pickling), salt (salting), smoke (smoking) and sugar (crystallization), have been used for centuries to preserve food. This allows for longer-lasting foods, such as bacon, sweets, and wines.

Some types of food additive include:

- Flavoring
- Food coloring
- Preservative
- Sweetener

=== Artificial ingredient ===
An artificial ingredient usually refers to an ingredient which is artificial or human-made. That is they are not extracted from a natural source such as plants, animals or fungi.

In some contexts artificial ingredients are only those that are not found in nature. Other human-synthesized chemical substances or substances isolated by chemical processes are categorized as nature-identical.

== Active ingredients and excipients ==
An excipient is a substance formulated alongside the active ingredient of a medication. They enhance the active ingredient's therapeutic properties; to facilitate drug absorption, to modify viscosity, to enhance solubility, to improve long-term stabilization (preventing denaturation and aggregation during the expected shelf life). In vaccine ingredients the active ingredient is called the immunogen.

== See also ==
- Fake food
- Bill of materials
- Software Bill of Materials
- Secret ingredient
- List of cosmetic ingredients
- Ingredient branding
