= Kube Cake =

Ghanaian candy

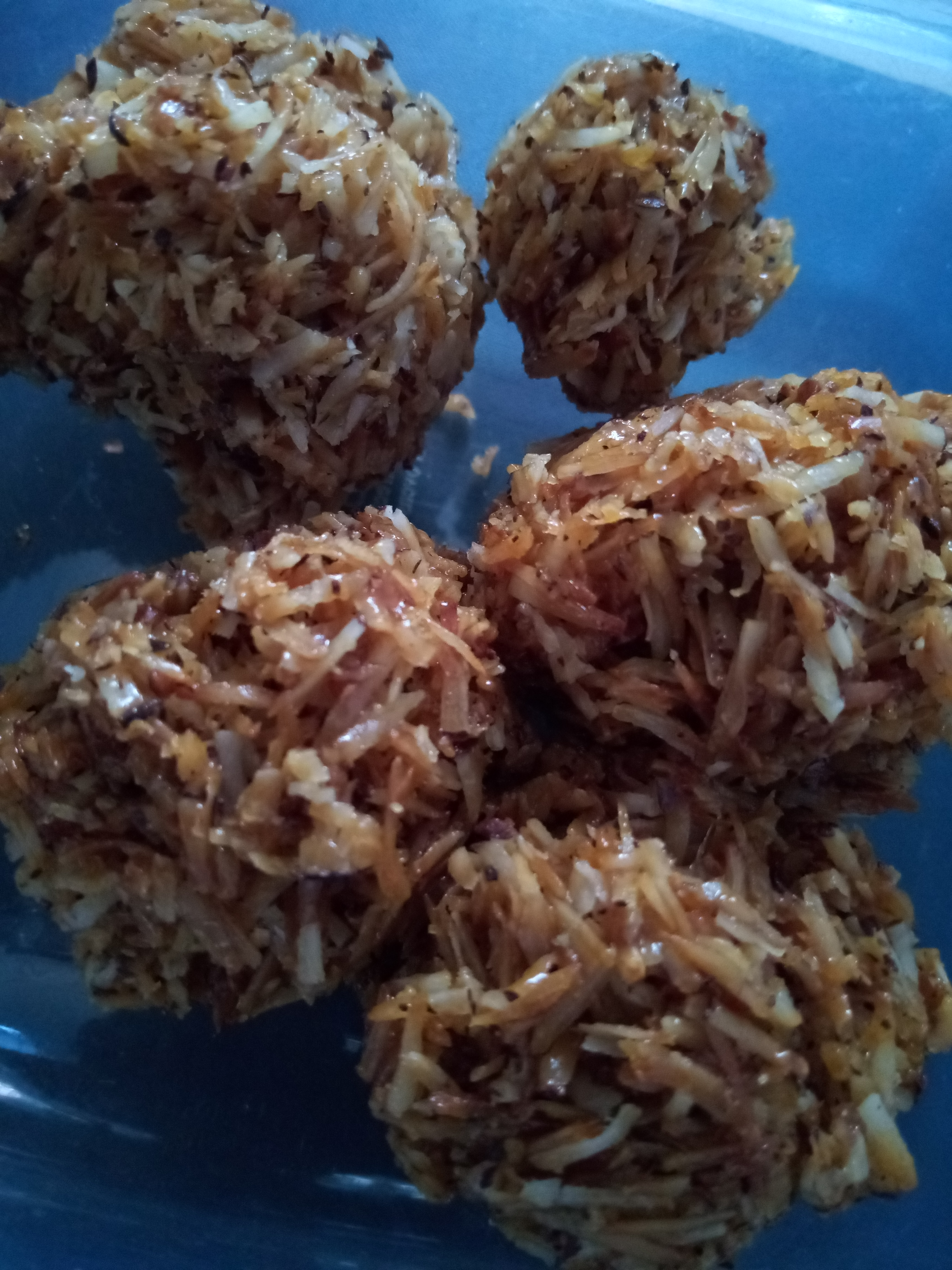
- Place of origin: Ghana
- Serving temperature: Hot/Cold
- Main ingredients: Coconut, Sugar, Water, Lemon

Kube Cake, also known as Kube Toffee, is a Ghanaian locally made candy.

== Ingredient ==
Ingredients used in preparation include coconut, sugar, water and lemon juice.

== Preparation ==
In preparing the candy the sugar is first heated until it becomes brown then the grated coconut, which has been dried, and then the lemon is added to flavor it. Pour it on a flat surface and start moulding it into small round crunchy candies.
