= Honey =

Foodstuff produced by bees

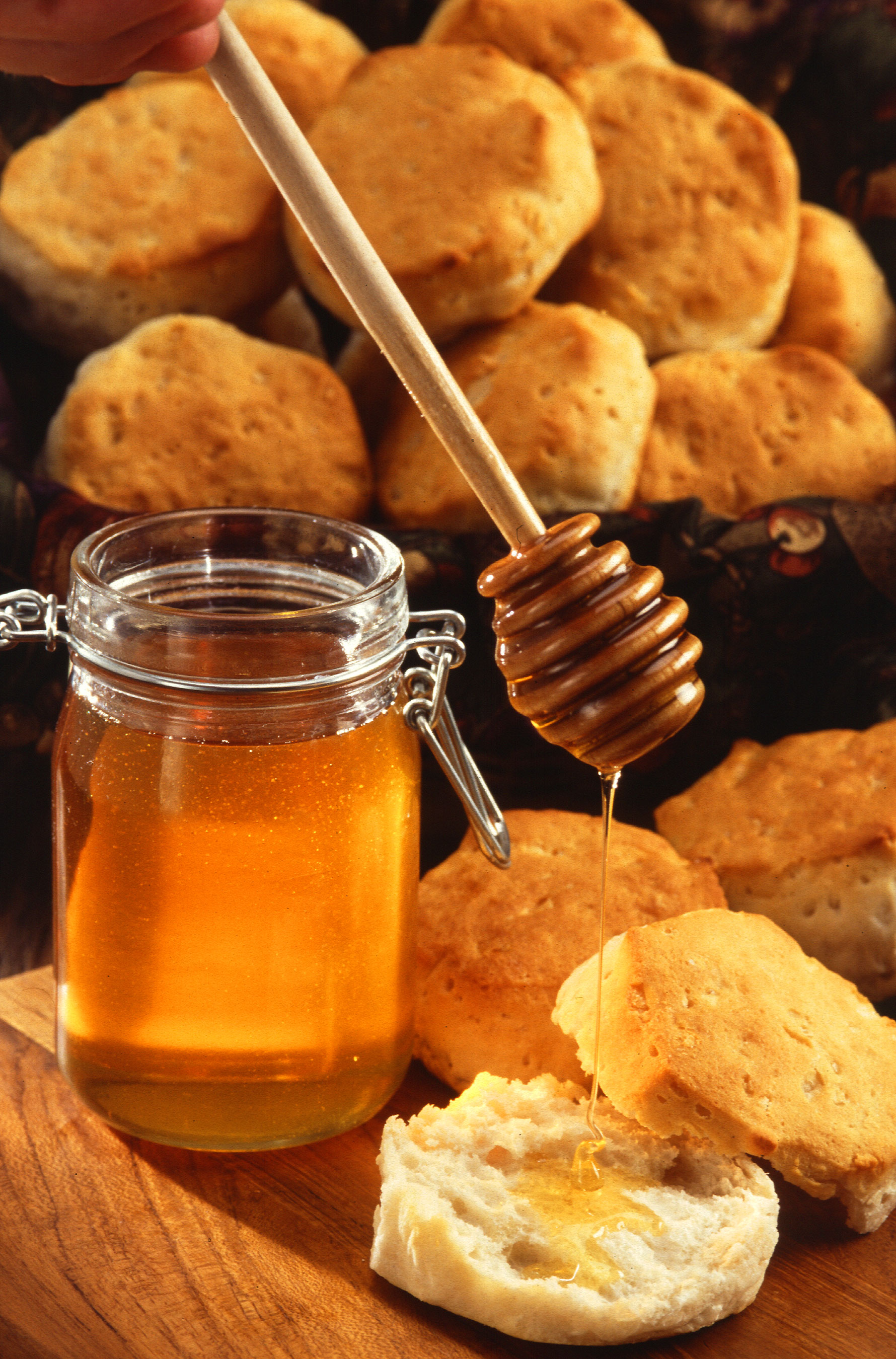
A jar of honey with a honey dipper and an American biscuit

Honey is a sweet and viscous foodstuff made by several species of bees, the best-known of which are honey bees. Honey is made and stored to nourish bee colonies. Bees produce honey by gathering and then refining the sugary secretions of plants (primarily floral nectar) or the secretions of other insects, like the honeydew of aphids. This refinement takes place both within individual bees, through regurgitation and enzymatic activity, and during storage in the hive, through water evaporation that concentrates the honey's sugars until it is thick and viscous.

Honey bees stockpile honey in the hive. Within the hive is a structure made from beeswax called honeycomb. The honeycomb is made up of hundreds or thousands of hexagonal cells, into which the bees regurgitate honey for storage. Other honey-producing species of bee store the substance in different structures, such as the pots made of wax and resin used by the stingless bee.

Honey for human consumption is collected from wild bee colonies, or from the hives of domesticated bees. The honey produced by honey bees is the most familiar to humans, thanks to its worldwide commercial production and availability. The husbandry of bees is known as beekeeping or apiculture, with the cultivation of stingless bees usually referred to as meliponiculture.

Honey is sweet because of its high concentrations of the monosaccharides fructose and glucose. It has about the same relative sweetness as sucrose (table sugar). One standard tablespoon (14 mL) of honey provides around 180 kilojoules (43 kilocalories) of food energy. It has attractive chemical properties for baking and a distinctive flavor when used as a sweetener. Due to honey's high sugar concentration and acidic pH level many microorganisms cannot grow in it and, when properly stored, honey therefore does not spoil. Samples of honey discovered in archaeological contexts have proven edible even after millennia.

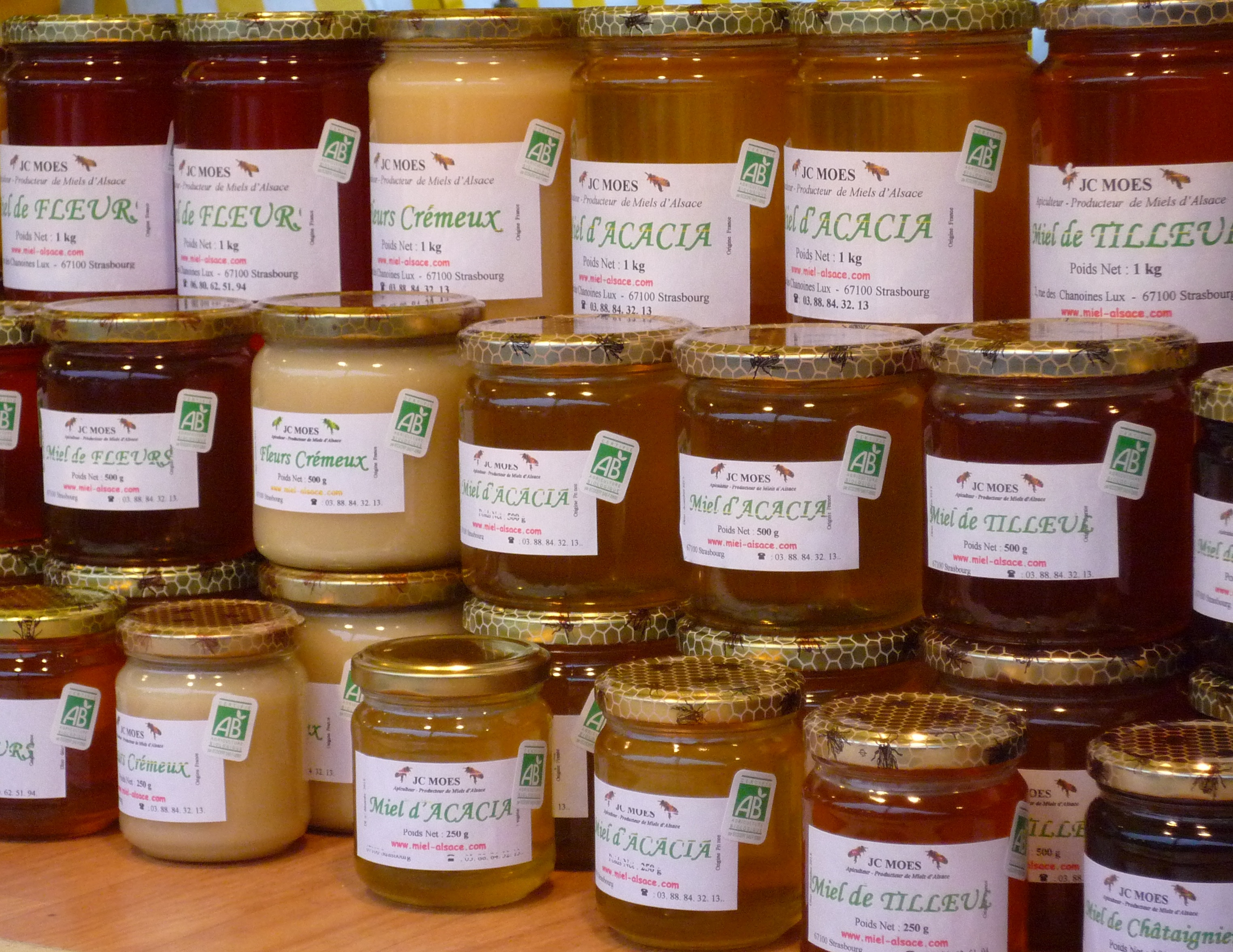
French honey from different floral sources, with visible differences in color and texture

Honey use and production has a long and varied history, with its beginnings in prehistoric times. Several cave paintings in Cuevas de la Araña in Spain depict humans foraging for honey at least 8,000 years ago. While Apis mellifera is an Old World insect, large-scale meliponiculture of New World stingless bees has been practiced by Mayans since pre-Columbian times.

== Formation ==
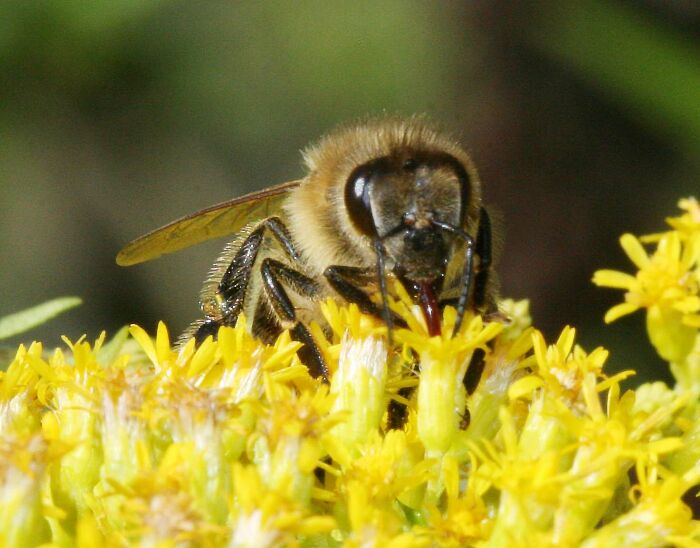
A honey bee with its proboscis extended into a calyx of goldenrod

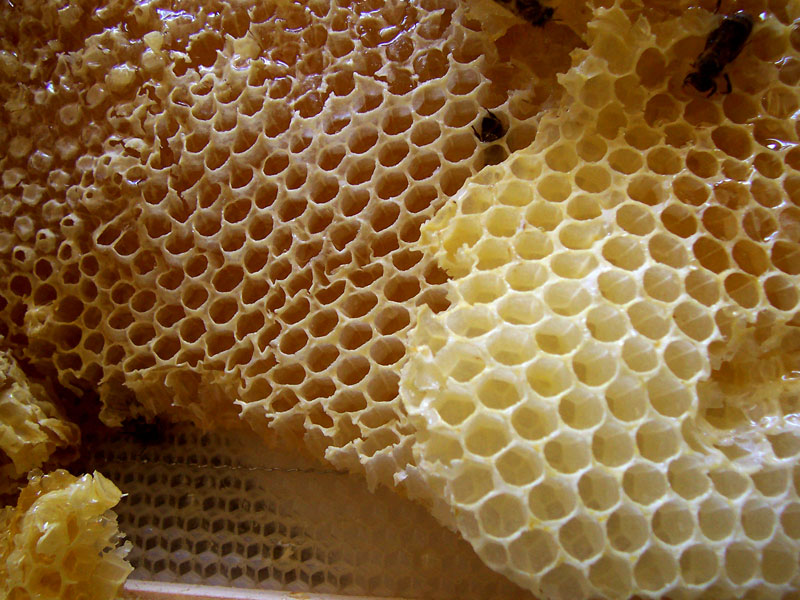
Honeycomb displaying hexagonal prismatic wax cells in which honey bees store honey

=== Honey bees ===
Honey is produced by bees who have collected nectar or honeydew. Bees value honey for its sugars, which they consume to support general metabolic activity, especially that of their flight muscles during foraging, and as a food for their larvae. To this end bees stockpile honey to provide for themselves during ordinary foraging as well as during lean periods, as in overwintering. During foraging bees use part of the nectar they collect to power their flight muscles. The majority of nectar collected is not used to directly nourish the insects but is instead destined for regurgitation, enzymatic digestion, and finally long-term storage as honey. During cold weather or when other food sources are scarce, adult and larval bees consume stored honey, which is many times more energy-dense as the nectar from which it is made.

After leaving the hive, a foraging bee collects sugar-rich nectar or honeydew. Nectar from the flower generally has a water content of 70 to 80% and is much less viscous than finished honey, which usually has a water content around 18%. The water content of honeydew from aphids and other true bugs is generally very close to the sap on which those insects feed and is usually somewhat more dilute than nectar. One source describes the water content of honeydew as around 89%. Whether it is feeding on nectar or honeydew, the bee sucks these runny fluids through its proboscis, which delivers the liquid to the bee's honey stomach or "honey crop". This cavity lies just above its food stomach, the latter of which digests pollen and sugars consumed by an individual honey bee for its own nourishment.

In Apis mellifera, the honey stomach holds about 40 mg of liquid. This is about half the weight of an unladen bee. Collecting this quantity in nectar can require visits to more than one thousand flowers. When nectar is plentiful, it can take a bee more than an hour of ceaseless work to collect enough nectar to fill its honey crop. Salivary enzymes and proteins from the bee's hypopharyngeal gland are secreted into the nectar once it is in the bee's honey stomach. These substances begin cleaving complex sugars like sucrose and starches into simpler sugars such as glucose and fructose. This process slightly raises the water content and the acidity of the partially digested nectar.

Once filled, the forager bees return to the hive. There they regurgitate and transfer nectar to hive bees. Once it is in their own honey stomachs, the hive bees regurgitate the nectar, repeatedly forming bubbles between their mandibles, speeding its digestion and concentration. These bubbles create a large surface area per volume and by this means the bees evaporate a portion of the nectar's water into the warm air of the hive.

Hive bees form honey-processing groups. These groups work in relay, with one bee subjecting the processed nectar to bubbling and then passing the refined liquid on to others. It can take as long as 20 minutes of continuous regurgitation, digestion and evaporation until the product reaches storage quality. The new honey is then placed in honeycomb cells, which are left uncapped. This honey still has a very high water content, up to 70%, depending on the concentration of nectar gathered. At this stage of its refinement the water content of the honey is high enough that ubiquitous yeast spores can reproduce in it, a process which, if left unchecked, would rapidly consume the new honey's sugars. To combat this, bees use an ability rare among insects: the endogenous generation of heat.

Bees are among the few insects that can create large amounts of body heat. They use this ability to produce a constant ambient temperature in their hives. Hive temperatures are usually around 35 °C (95 °F) in the honey-storage areas. This temperature is regulated either by generating heat with their bodies or removing it through water evaporation. The evaporation removes water from the stored honey, drawing heat from the colony. The bees use their wings to govern hive cooling. Coordinated wing beating moves air across the wet honey, drawing out water and heat. Ventilation of the hive eventually expels both excess water and heat into the outside world.

The process of evaporating continues until the honey reaches its final water content of between 15.5% and 18%. This concentrates the sugars far beyond the saturation point of water, which is to say there is far more sugar dissolved in what little water remains in honey than ever could be dissolved in an equivalent volume of water. Honey, even at hive temperatures, is therefore a supersaturated solution of various sugars in water. These concentrations of sugar can only be achieved near room temperature by evaporation of a less concentrated solution, in this case nectar. For osmotic reasons such high concentrations of sugar are extremely unfavorable to microbiological reproduction and all fermentation is consequently halted. The bees then cap the cells of finished honey with wax. This seals them from contamination and prevents further evaporation.

So long as its water concentration does not rise much above 18%, honey has an indefinite shelf life, both within the hive and after its removal by a beekeeper.

=== Other insects ===
Honey bees are not the only eusocial insects to produce honey. All non-parasitic bumblebees and stingless bees produce honey. Some wasp species, such as Brachygastra lecheguana and Brachygastra mellifica, found in South and Central America, are known to feed on nectar and produce honey. Other wasps, such as Polistes versicolor, also consume honey. In the middle of their life cycles they alternate between feeding on protein-rich pollen and feeding on honey, which is a far denser source of food energy.

=== Human intervention ===
Humans have semi-domesticated several species of honey bee by taking advantage of their swarming stage. Swarming is the means by which new colonies are established when there is no longer space for expansion in the colony's present hive. The old queen lays eggs that will develop into new queens and then leads as many as half the colony to a site for a new hive. Bees generally swarm before a suitable location for another hive has been discovered by scouts sent out for this purpose. Until such a location is found the swarm will simply conglomerate near the former hive, often from tree branches. These swarms are unusually docile and amenable to transport by humans. When provided with a suitable nesting site, such as a commercial Langstroth hive, the swarm will readily form a new colony in artificial surroundings. These semi-domesticated colonies are then looked after by humans practicing apiculture or meliponiculture. Captured bees are encouraged to forage, often in agricultural settings such as orchards, where pollinators are highly valued. The honey, pollen, wax and resins the bees produce are all harvested by humans for a variety of uses.

The term "semi-domesticated" is preferred because all bee colonies, even those in very large agricultural apiculture operations, readily leave the protection of humans in swarms that can establish successful wild colonies. Much of the effort in commercial beekeeping is dedicated to persuading a hive that is ready to swarm to produce more honeycomb in its present location. This is usually done by adding more space to the colony with honey supers, empty boxes placed on top of an existing colony. The bees can then usually be enticed to develop this empty space instead of dividing their colony through swarming.

== Production ==
=== Collection ===
Honey is collected from wild bee colonies or from domesticated beehives. On average, a hive will produce about 29 kilograms (65 lb) of honey per year. Wild bee nests are sometimes located by following a honeyguide bird.

To safely collect honey from a hive, beekeepers typically pacify the bees using a bee smoker. The smoke triggers a feeding instinct (an attempt to save the resources of the hive from a possible fire), making them less aggressive, and obscures the pheromones the bees use to communicate. The honeycomb is removed from the hive and the honey may be extracted from it either by crushing or by using a honey extractor. The honey is then usually filtered to remove beeswax and other debris.

Before the invention of removable frames, bee colonies were often sacrificed to conduct the harvest. The harvester would take all the available honey and replace the entire colony the next spring. Since the invention of removable frames, the principles of husbandry led most beekeepers to ensure that their bees have enough stores to survive the winter, either by leaving some honey in the beehive or by providing the colony with a honey substitute such as sugar water or crystalline sugar (often in the form of a "candyboard"). The amount of food necessary to survive the winter depends on the variety of bees and on the length and severity of local winters.

Many animal species are attracted to wild or domestic sources of honey.

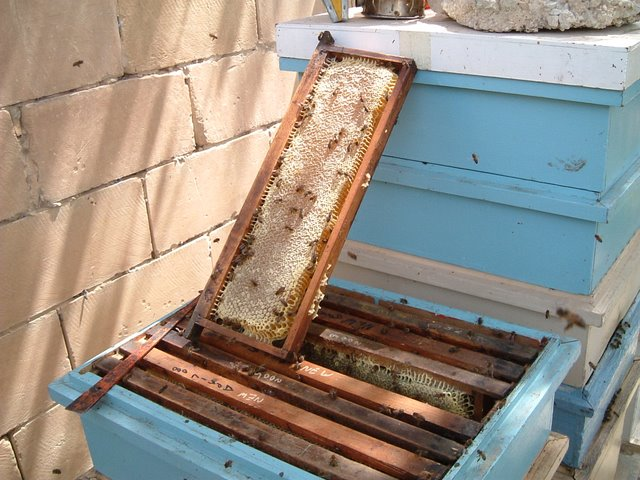
Sealed frame of honey

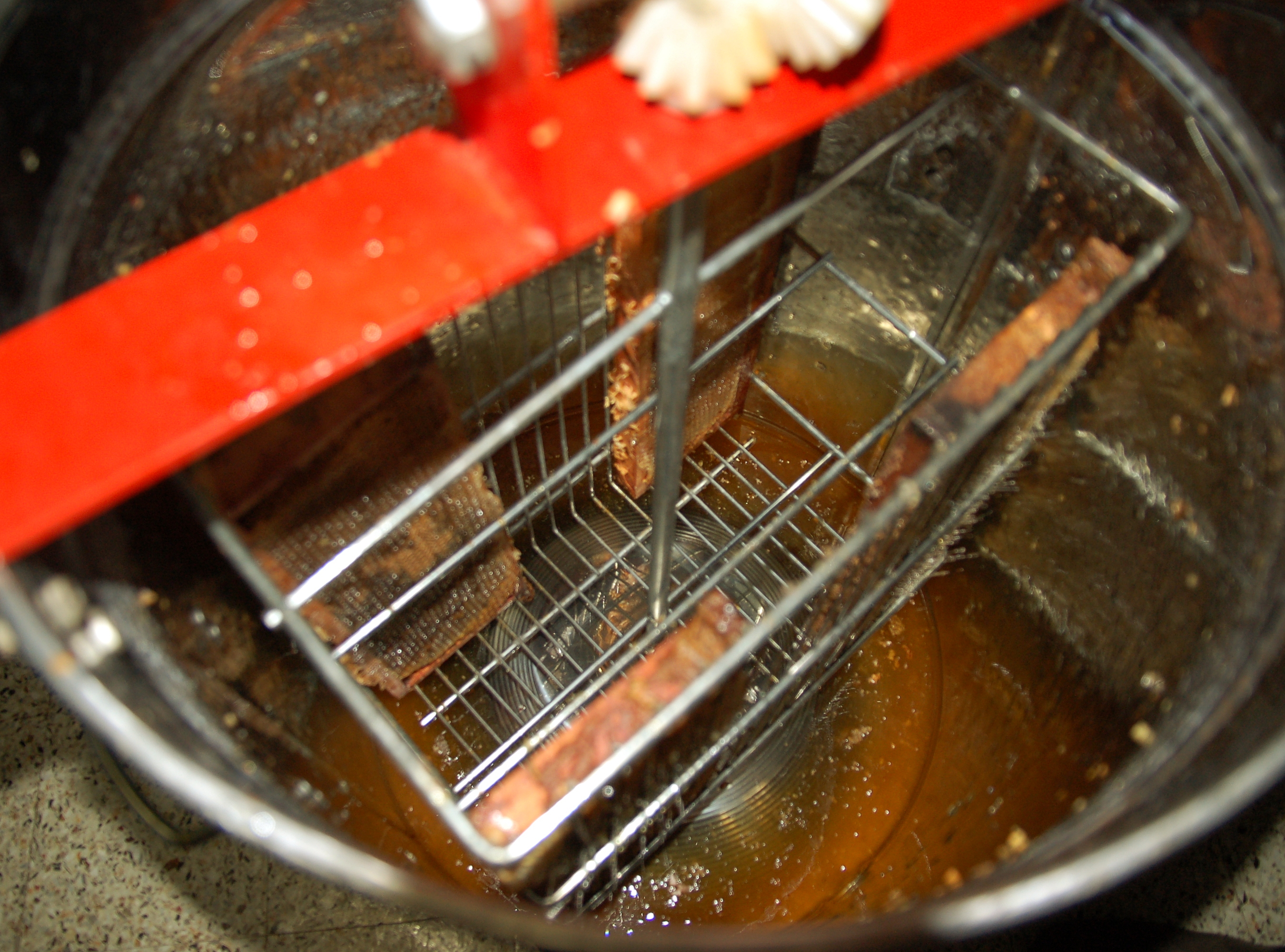
Extraction from a honeycomb

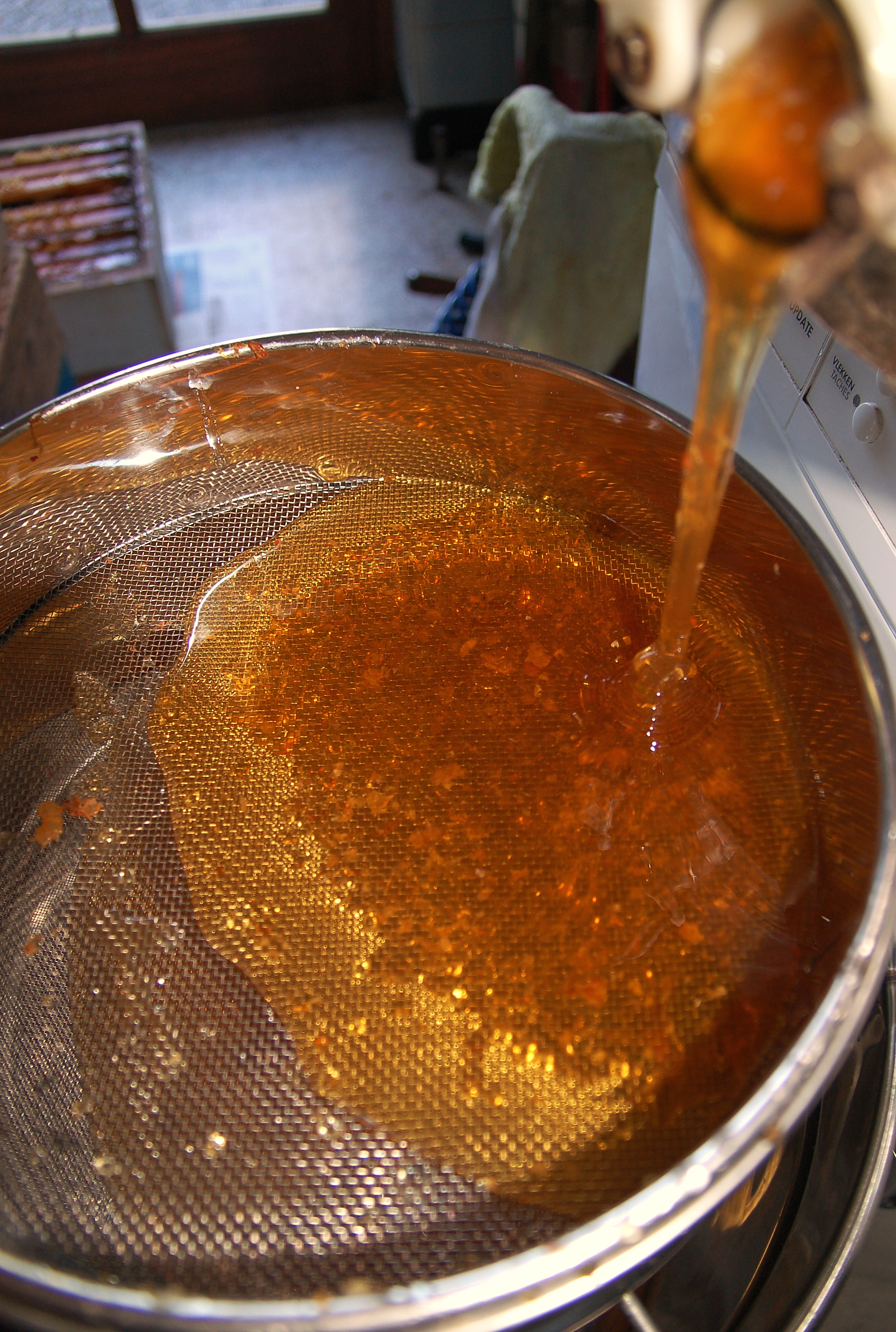
Filtering from a honeycomb

=== Preservation ===
Because of its composition and chemical properties, honey is suitable for long-term storage, and is easily assimilated even after long preservation. Honey, and objects immersed in honey, have been preserved for centuries. (However, no edible honey has been found in Egyptian tombs; all such cases have been proven to be other substances or only chemical traces.) The key to preservation is limiting access to humidity. In its cured state, honey has a sufficiently high sugar content to inhibit fermentation. If exposed to moist air, its hydrophilic properties pull moisture into the honey, eventually diluting it to the point that fermentation can begin.

The long shelf life of honey is attributed to an enzyme found in the stomach of bees. The bees mix glucose oxidase with expelled nectar they previously consumed, creating two byproducts – gluconic acid and hydrogen peroxide, which are partially responsible for honey acidity and suppression of bacterial growth.

=== Production ===
Honey production 2023, tonnes
China	463,500
Turkey	114,886
Ethiopia	84,591
Iran	80,389
Argentina	73,395
United States	62,855
World	1,893,805
Source: FAOSTAT of the United Nations

In 2023, world production of honey was 1.9 million tonnes, led by China with 24% of the total, and Turkey, Ethiopia, and Iran as secondary producers (table).

Production of honey

Yearly per capita supply of honey

== Adulteration ==
Honey is sometimes adulterated by the addition of other sugars, syrups or compounds. This may be done to alter flavour or viscosity, reduce production costs, or increase fructose content, which can inhibit crystallization.

Adulteration of honey has been documented since ancient times. Historical sources describe honey being blended with plant syrups such as maple, birch or sorghum syrup and sold as pure honey. In some cases, crystallized honey was mixed with flour or other fillers. This practice could conceal adulteration until the honey was heated and liquefied.

In more recent times, clear, nearly flavourless corn syrup has become the most common adulterant. Honey adulterated with corn syrup can be difficult to distinguish from unadulterated honey.

According to the Codex Alimentarius of the United Nations, products labelled as “honey” or “pure honey” must not be adulterated. Honey labelling requirements, however, vary between countries.

In the United States, the National Honey Board identifies honey authenticity as a major challenge for the honey industry. Over the past half century, a range of analytical methods has been developed to detect food fraud. The National Honey Board notes that no single universal method is currently capable of detecting all forms of honey adulteration with adequate sensitivity.

One technique used to detect adulteration is Isotope ratio mass spectrometry. This method can identify the addition of cane sugar or corn syrup by analysing carbon isotopic signatures. Corn and sugar cane are C4 plants, whereas the plants used by bees to produce honey, as well as sugar beet, are predominantly C3 plants. Sugars derived from C4 plants alter the isotopic ratio of sugars in honey but do not affect the isotopic ratio of proteins. In unadulterated honey, the carbon isotopic ratios of sugars and proteins are expected to match. Using this method, adulteration levels as low as seven per cent can be detected.

== Modern uses ==
=== Food ===
Over its history as a food, the main uses of honey are in cooking, baking, desserts, as a spread on bread, as an addition to various beverages such as tea, and as a sweetener in some commercial beverages.

Due to its energy density, honey is an important food for virtually all hunter-gatherer cultures in warm climates, with the Hadza people ranking honey as their favorite food. Honey hunters in Africa have a mutualistic relationship with certain species of honeyguide birds.

=== Fermentation ===
Possibly the world's oldest fermented beverage, dating from 9,000 years ago, mead ("honey wine") is the alcoholic product made by adding yeast to honey-water must and fermenting it for weeks or months. The yeast Saccharomyces cerevisiae is commonly used in modern mead production.

Mead varieties include drinks called metheglin (with spices or herbs), melomel (with fruit juices, such as grape, specifically called pyment), hippocras (with cinnamon), and sack mead (high concentration of honey), many of which have been developed as commercial products numbering in the hundreds in the United States. Honey is also used to make mead beer, called "braggot".

=== Health ===
==== Wounds and burns ====
Honey is a folk treatment for burns and other skin injuries. Preliminary evidence suggests that it aids in the healing of partial thickness burns 4–5 days faster than other dressings, and moderate evidence suggests that post-operative infections treated with honey heal faster and with fewer adverse events than with antiseptic and gauze. The evidence for the use of honey in various other wound treatments is of low quality, and firm conclusions cannot be drawn. Evidence does not support the use of honey-based products for the treatment of venous stasis ulcers or ingrown toenail. Several medical-grade honey products have been approved by the US Food and Drug Administration for use in treating minor wounds and burns.

==== Antibiotic ====
Honey has long been used as a topical antibiotic by practitioners of traditional and herbal medicine. Honey's antibacterial effects were first demonstrated by the Dutch scientist Bernardus Adrianus van Ketel in 1892. Since then, numerous studies have shown that honey has broad-spectrum antibacterial activity against gram-positive and gram-negative bacteria, although potency varies widely between different honeys. Due to the proliferation of antibiotic-resistant bacteria in the last few decades, there has been renewed interest in researching the antibacterial properties of honey. Components of honey under preliminary research for potential antibiotic use include methylglyoxal, hydrogen peroxide, and royalisin (also called defensin-1).

==== Cough ====
For chronic and acute coughs, a Cochrane review found no strong evidence for or against the use of honey. In children, there is moderate to low evidence that honey helps more than no treatment, diphenhydramine, and placebo at improving coughing. And it may work better than dextromethorphan at relieving coughing in children. Other reviews have also supported the use of honey for treating children.

The UK Medicines and Healthcare products Regulatory Agency recommends avoiding giving over-the-counter cough and common cold medication to children under six, and suggests "a homemade remedy containing honey and lemon is likely to be just as useful and safer to take", but warns that honey should not be given to babies because of the risk of infant botulism. The World Health Organization recommends honey as a treatment for coughs and sore throats, including for children, stating that no reason exists to believe it is less effective than a commercial remedy.

==== Other ====
The use of honey has been recommended as a temporary intervention for known or suspected button cell battery ingestions to reduce the risk and severity of injury to the esophagus caused by the battery prior to its removal.

There is no evidence that honey is beneficial for treating cancer, although honey may be useful for controlling side effects of radiation therapy or chemotherapy used to treat cancer.

Consumption is sometimes advocated as a treatment for seasonal allergies due to pollen, but scientific evidence to support the claim is inconclusive. Honey is generally considered ineffective for the treatment of allergic conjunctivitis.

Honey has a mild laxative effect which has been noted as being helpful in alleviating constipation and bloating.

==== Health hazards ====
Honey is generally safe when taken in typical food amounts, but it may have various, potential adverse effects or interactions in combination with excessive consumption, existing disease conditions, or drugs. Included among these are mild reactions to high intake, such as anxiety, insomnia, or hyperactivity in about 10% of children, according to one study. No symptoms of anxiety, insomnia, or hyperactivity were detected with honey consumption compared to placebo, according to another study. Honey consumption may interact adversely with existing allergies, high blood sugar levels (as in diabetes), or anticoagulants used to control bleeding, among other clinical conditions.

People who have a weakened immune system may be at risk of bacterial or fungal infection from eating honey.

===== Botulism =====
Infants can develop botulism after consuming honey contaminated with Clostridium botulinum endospores. While the risk honey poses to infant health is small, taking the risk is not recommended until after one year of age, and then giving honey is considered safe. Infantile botulism shows geographical variation. In the UK, only six cases were reported between 1976 and 2006, yet the US has much higher rates: 1.9 per 100,000 live births, 47.2% of which are in California.

===== Toxic honey =====
Mad honey intoxication is a result of eating honey containing grayanotoxins. Honey produced from flowers of rhododendrons, mountain laurels, sheep laurel, and azaleas may cause honey intoxication. Symptoms include dizziness, weakness, excessive perspiration, nausea, and vomiting. Less commonly, low blood pressure, shock, heart rhythm irregularities, and convulsions may occur, with rare cases resulting in death. According to the FDA, honey intoxication is more likely when using "natural" unprocessed honey from farmers who may have a small number of hives because commercial processing, which pools of honey from numerous sources, dilutes the toxins.

Toxic honey may also result when bees are proximate to tutu bushes (Coriaria arborea) and the vine hopper insect (Scolypopa australis). Both are found throughout New Zealand. Bees gather honeydew produced by the vine hopper insects feeding on the tutu plant. This introduces the poison tutin into honey. Only a few areas in New Zealand (the Coromandel Peninsula, Eastern Bay of Plenty Region and the Marlborough Sounds) frequently produce toxic honey. Symptoms of tutin poisoning include vomiting, delirium, giddiness, increased excitability, stupor, coma, and violent convulsions. To reduce the risk of tutin poisoning, humans should not eat honey taken from feral hives in the risk areas of New Zealand. Since December 2001, New Zealand beekeepers have been required to reduce the risk of producing toxic honey by closely monitoring tutu, vine hopper, and foraging conditions within 3 km (2 mi) of their apiary. Intoxication is rarely dangerous.

==== Folk medicine ====
In myths and folk medicine, honey was used both orally and topically to treat various ailments including gastric disturbances, ulcers, skin wounds, and skin burns by ancient Greeks and Egyptians, and in Ayurveda and traditional Chinese medicine.

== Physical and chemical properties ==
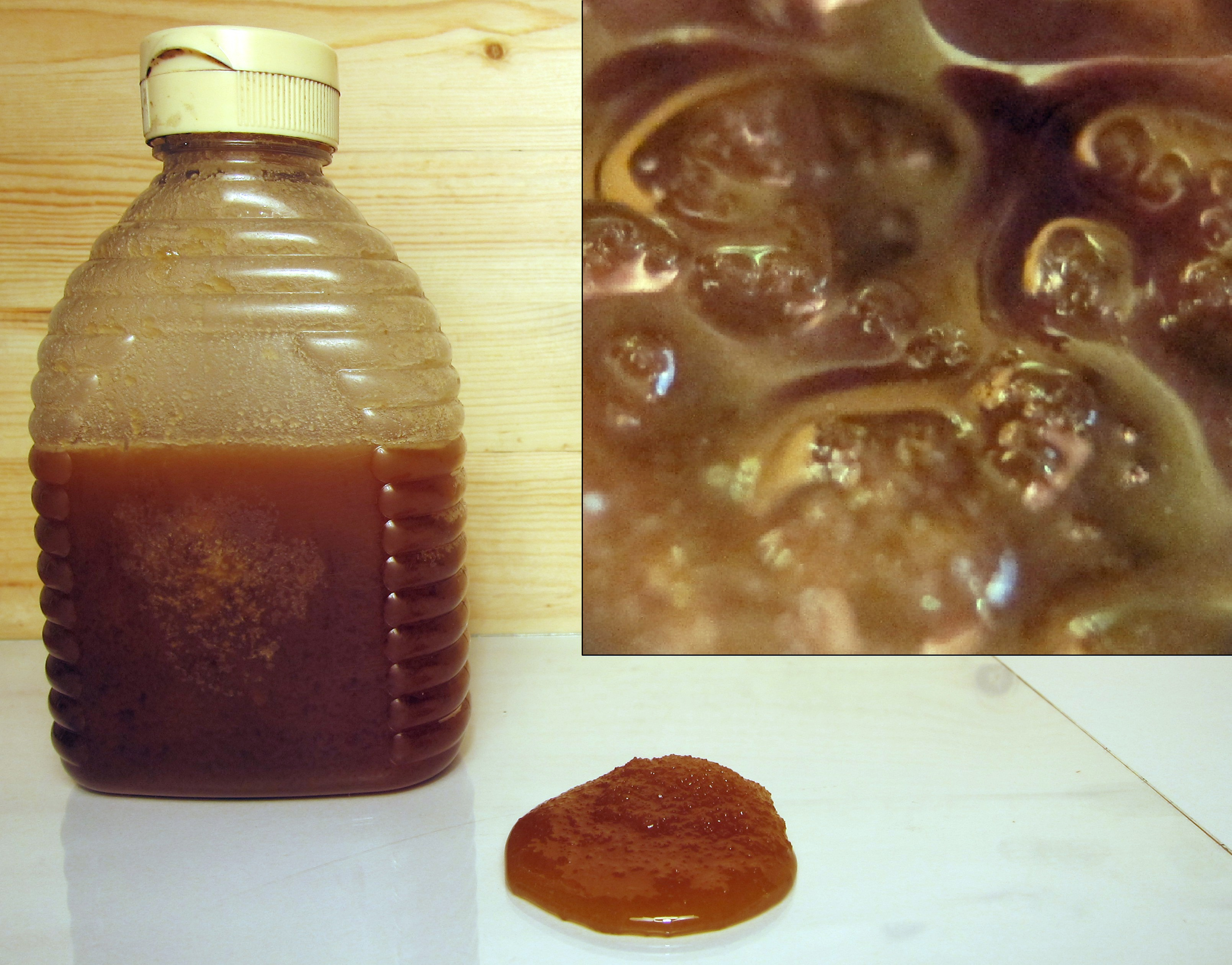
Crystallized honey: The inset shows a close-up of the honey, showing the individual glucose grains in the fructose mixture.

The physical properties of honey vary, depending on water content, the type of flora used to produce it (pasturage), temperature, and the proportion of the specific sugars it contains. Fresh honey is a supersaturated liquid, containing more sugar than the water can typically dissolve at ambient temperatures. At room temperature, honey is a supersaturated solution, in which the glucose precipitates into solid granules. This forms a semisolid mixture of precipitated glucose crystals in a solution of fructose and other ingredients.

The density of honey typically ranges between 1.38 and 1.45 kg/L at 20 °C (68 °F).

=== Phase transitions ===
The saturation point of honey is between 40 and 50 °C (104 and 122 °F), depending on its composition. Below this temperature, honey can be either in a metastable state, meaning that it will not crystallize until a seed crystal is added, or, more often, it is in a "labile" state, being saturated with enough sugars to crystallize spontaneously. The rate of crystallization is affected by many factors, but the primary factor is the ratio of the main sugars: fructose to glucose. Honeys that are supersaturated with a very high percentage of glucose, such as brassica honey, crystallize almost immediately after harvesting, while honeys with a low percentage of glucose, such as chestnut or tupelo honey, do not crystallize. Some types of honey may produce few but very large crystals, while others produce many small crystals.

Crystallization is also affected by water content, because a high percentage of water inhibits crystallization, as does a high dextrin content. Temperature also affects the rate of crystallization, with the fastest growth occurring between 13 and 17 °C (55 and 63 °F). Crystal nuclei (seeds) tend to form more readily if the honey is disturbed, by stirring, shaking, or agitating, rather than if left at rest. However, the nucleation of microscopic seed-crystals is greatest between 5 and 8 °C (41 and 46 °F). Therefore, larger but fewer crystals tend to form at higher temperatures, while smaller but more-numerous crystals usually form at lower temperatures. Below 5 °C (41 °F), the honey will not crystallize, thus the original texture and flavor can be preserved indefinitely.

Honey is a supersaturated solution when stored below its saturation point, as is normal. At very low temperatures, honey does not solidify; rather its viscosity increases. Like most viscous liquids, the honey becomes thick and sluggish with decreasing temperature. At −20 °C (−4 °F), honey may appear or even feel solid, but it continues to flow at very low rates. Honey has a glass transition between −42 and −51 °C (−44 and −60 °F). Below this temperature, honey enters a glassy state and becomes an amorphous solid (noncrystalline).

=== Rheology ===
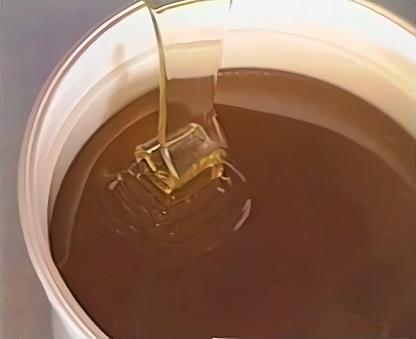
Pouring raw honey. The sheet-like appearance of the flow is the result of high viscosity and low surface tension, contributing to the stickiness of honey.

The viscosity of honey is affected greatly by both temperature and water content. The higher the water percentage, the more easily honey flows. Above its saturation point, however, water has little effect on viscosity. Aside from water content, the composition of most types of honey also has little effect on viscosity. At 25 °C (77 °F), honey with 14% water content generally has a viscosity around 400 poise, while a honey containing 20% water has a viscosity around 20 poise. Viscosity increases very slowly with moderate cooling; a honey containing 16% water, at 70 °C (158 °F), has a viscosity around 2 poise, while at 30 °C (86 °F), the viscosity is around 70 poise. With further cooling, the increase in viscosity is more rapid, reaching 600 poise at around 14 °C (57 °F). However, while honey is viscous, it has low surface tension of 50–60 mJ/m^{2}, making its wettability similar to water, glycerin, or most other liquids. The high viscosity and wettability of honey cause stickiness, which is a time-dependent process in supersaturated solutions between the glass-transition temperature (T_{g}) and the crystalline-melting temperature.

Most types of honey are Newtonian liquids, but a few types have non-Newtonian viscous properties. Honeys from heather or mānuka display thixotropic properties. These types of honey enter a gel-like state when motionless, but liquefy when stirred.

=== Electrical and optical properties ===
Because honey contains electrolytes, in the form of acids and minerals, it exhibits varying degrees of electrical conductivity. Measurements of the electrical conductivity are used to determine the quality of honey in terms of ash content.

The effect honey has on light is useful for determining the type and quality. Variations in its water content alter its refractive index. Water content can easily be measured with a refractometer. Typically, the refractive index for honey ranges from 1.504 at 13% water content to 1.474 at 25%. Honey also has an effect on polarized light, in that it rotates the polarization plane. The fructose gives a negative rotation, while the glucose gives a positive one. The overall rotation can be used to measure the ratio of the mixture. Honey is generally pale yellow and dark brown in color, but other colors can occur, depending on the sugar source. Bee colonies that forage on Kudzu (Pueraria montana var. lobata) flowers, for example, produce honey that varies in color from red to purple.

=== Hygroscopy and fermentation ===
Honey has the ability to absorb moisture directly from the air, a phenomenon called hygroscopy. The amount of water the honey absorbs is dependent on the relative humidity of the air. Because honey contains yeast, this hygroscopic nature requires that honey be stored in sealed containers to prevent fermentation, which usually begins if the honey's water content rises much above 25%. Honey tends to absorb more water in this manner than the individual sugars allow on their own, which may be due to other ingredients it contains.

Fermentation of honey usually occurs after crystallization, because without the glucose, the liquid portion of the honey primarily consists of a concentrated mixture of fructose, acids, and water, providing the yeast with enough of an increase in the water percentage for growth. Honey that is to be stored at room temperature for long periods of time is often pasteurized, to kill any yeast, by heating it above 70 °C (158 °F).

=== Thermal characteristics ===
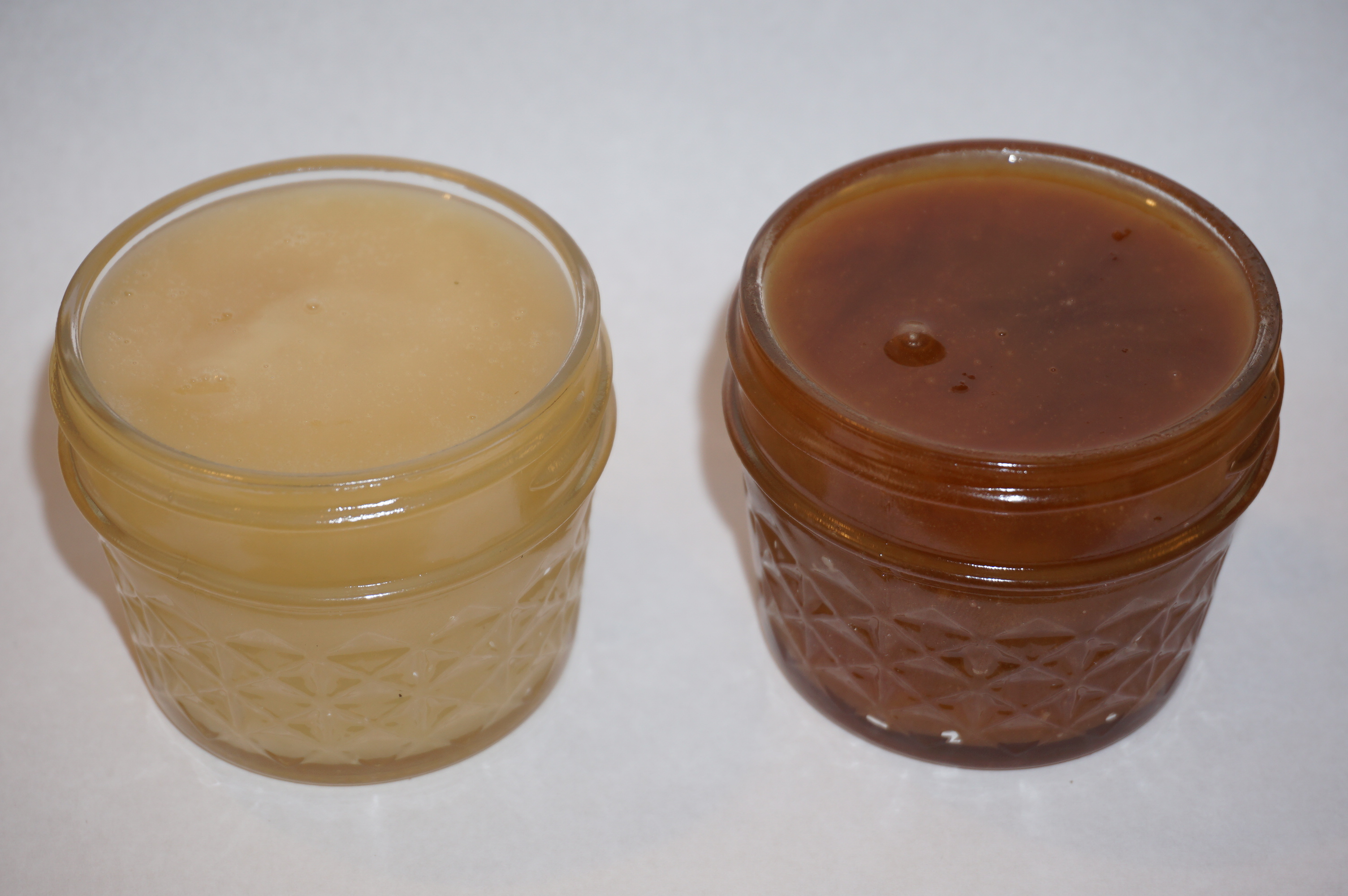
Creamed honey: the honey on the left is fresh, and the honey on the right has been aged at room temperature for two years. The Maillard reaction produces considerable differences in the color and flavor of the aged honey, which remains edible.

Like all sugar compounds, honey caramelizes if heated sufficiently, becoming darker in color, and eventually burns. However, honey contains fructose, which caramelizes at lower temperatures than glucose. The temperature at which caramelization begins varies, depending on the composition, but is typically between 70 and 110 °C (158 and 230 °F). Honey also contains acids, which act as catalysts for caramelization. The specific types of acids and their amounts play a primary role in determining the exact temperature. Of these acids, the amino acids, which occur in very small amounts, play an important role in the darkening of honey. The amino acids form darkened compounds called melanoidins, during a Maillard reaction. The Maillard reaction occurs slowly at room temperature, taking from a few to several months to show visible darkening, but speeds up dramatically with increasing temperatures. However, the reaction can also be slowed by storing the honey at colder temperatures.

Unlike many other liquids, honey has very poor thermal conductivity of 0.5 W/(m K) at 13% water content (compared to 401 W/(m⋅K) of copper), taking a long time to reach thermal equilibrium. Due to its high kinematic viscosity honey does not transfer heat through momentum diffusion (convection) but rather through thermal diffusion (more like a solid), so heating crystallized honey can easily result in localized caramelization if the heat source is too hot or not evenly distributed. However, honey takes substantially longer to liquefy when just above the saturation point than at elevated temperatures. Redissolving 20 kg (44 lb) of crystallized honey by heating it at 40 °C (104 °F) can take up to 24 hours, while 50 kg (110 lb) may take twice as long. These times can be cut nearly in half by heating at 50 °C (122 °F); however, many of the minor substances in honey can be affected greatly by heating, changing the flavor, aroma, or other properties, so heating is usually done at the lowest temperature and for the shortest time possible.

=== Acid content and flavor effects ===
The average pH of honey is 3.9, but can range from 3.4 to 6.1. Honey contains many kinds of acids, both organic and amino. However, the different types and their amounts vary considerably, depending on the type of honey. These acids may be aromatic or aliphatic (nonaromatic). The aliphatic acids contribute greatly to the flavor of honey by interacting with the flavors of other ingredients.

Organic acids comprise most of the acids in honey, accounting for 0.17–1.17% of the mixture, with gluconic acid formed by the actions of glucose oxidase as the most prevalent. Minor amounts of other organic acids are present, consisting of formic, acetic, butyric, citric, lactic, malic, pyroglutamic, propionic, valeric, capronic, palmitic, and succinic, among many others.

=== Volatile organic compounds ===
Individual honeys from different plant sources contain over 100 volatile organic compounds (VOCs), which play a primary role in determining honey flavors and aromas. VOCs are carbon-based compounds that readily vaporize into the air, providing aroma, including the scents of flowers, essential oils, or ripening fruit. The typical chemical families of VOCs found in honey include hydrocarbons, aldehydes, alcohols, ketones, esters, acids, benzenes, furans, pyrans, norisoprenoids, and terpenes, among many others and their derivatives. The specific VOCs and their amounts vary considerably between different types of honey obtained by bees foraging on different plant sources. By example, when comparing the mixture of VOCs in different honeys in one review, longan honey had a higher amount of volatiles (48 VOCs), while sunflower honey had the lowest number of volatiles (8 VOCs).

VOCs are primarily introduced into the honey from the nectar, where they are excreted by the flowers imparting individual scents. The specific types and concentrations of certain VOCs can be used to determine the type of flora used to produce monofloral honeys. The specific geography, soil composition and acidity used to grow the flora also have an effect on honey aroma properties, such as a "fruity" or "grassy" aroma from longan honey, or a "waxy" aroma from sunflower honey. Dominant VOCs in one study were linalool oxide, trans-linalool oxide, 2-phenylacetaldehyde, benzyl ethanol, isophorone, and methyl nonanoate.

VOCs can also be introduced from the bodies of the bees, be produced by the enzymatic actions of digestion, or from chemical reactions that occur between different substances within the honey during storage, and therefore may change, increase, or decrease over long periods of time. VOCs may be produced, altered, or greatly affected by temperature and processing. Some VOCs are heat labile, and are destroyed at elevated temperatures, while others can be created during non-enzymatic reactions, such as the Maillard reaction. VOCs are responsible for nearly all of the aroma produced by a honey, which may be described as "sweet", "flowery", "citrus", "almond" or "rancid", among other terms. In addition, VOCs play a large role in determining the specific flavor of the honey, both through the aromas and flavor. VOCs from honeys in different geographic regions can be used as floral markers of those regions, and as markers of the bees that foraged the nectars.

== Classification ==
Honey is classified by its source (floral or not), and divisions are made according to the packaging and processing used. Regional honeys are also identified. In the US, honey is also graded on its color and optical density by USDA standards, graded on the Pfund scale, which ranges from 0 for "water white" honey to more than 114 for "dark amber" honey.

=== Plant source ===
Generally, honey is classified by the floral source of the nectar from which it was made. Honeys can be from specific types of flower nectars or can be blended after collection. The pollen in honey is traceable to floral source and therefore region of origin. The rheological and melissopalynological properties of honey can be used to identify the major plant nectar source used in its production.

==== Monofloral ====
Monofloral honey is made primarily from the nectar of one type of flower. Monofloral honeys have distinctive flavors and colors because of differences between their principal nectar sources. To produce monofloral honey, beekeepers keep beehives in an area where the bees have access, as far as possible, to only one type of flower. In practice, a small proportion of any monofloral honey will be from other flower types. Typical examples of North American monofloral honeys are clover, orange blossom, sage, tupelo, buckwheat, fireweed, mesquite, sourwood, cherry, and blueberry.

Some typical European examples include thyme, thistle, heather, acacia, dandelion, sunflower, lavender, honeysuckle, and varieties from lime and chestnut trees. In North Africa (e.g. Egypt), examples include clover, cotton, and citrus (mainly orange blossoms).

The unique flora of Australia yields a number of distinctive honeys, with some of the most popular being yellow box, blue gum, ironbark, bush mallee, Tasmanian leatherwood, and macadamia. Mānuka honey, produced from the nectar of Leptospermum scoparium in New Zealand and parts of Australia, is darker in color and has an earthy, slightly bitter flavor profile compared with lighter honeys such as clover.

==== Polyfloral ====
Polyfloral honey, also known as wildflower honey, is derived from the nectar of many types of flowers. The taste may vary from year to year, and the aroma and the flavor can be more or less intense, depending on which flowers are blooming.

==== Honeydew honey ====
Honeydew honey is made from bees taking direct secretions from trees such as pine, fir, chestnut, and oak or primarily honeydew, the sweet secretions of aphids or other plant-sap-sucking insects, to produce honey rather than from nectar. This honey has a much larger proportion of indigestibles than light floral honeys, thus causing dysentery to the bees. Honeydew honey has a stronger and less sweet flavor than nectar-based honey, and European countries have been the primary market for honeydew honey. In Greece, pine honey, a type of honeydew honey, constitutes 60–65% of honey production.

=== By packaging and processing ===
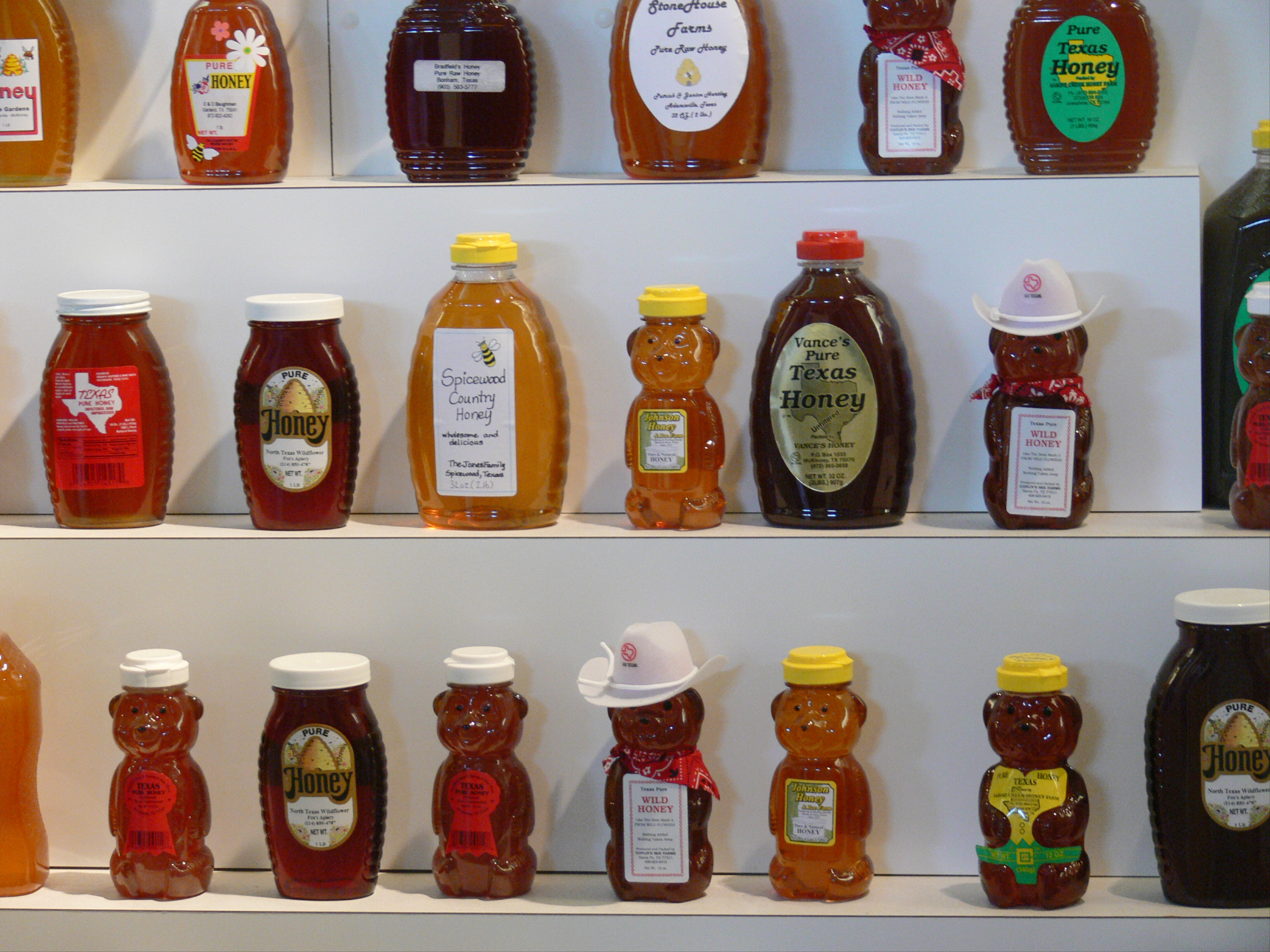
A variety of honey flavors and container sizes and styles from the 2008 Texas State Fair

Generally, honey is bottled in its familiar liquid form, but it is sold in other forms, and can be subjected to a variety of processing methods.

- Crystallized honey occurs when some of the glucose content has spontaneously crystallized from solution as the monohydrate. It is also called "granulated honey" or "candied honey". Honey that has crystallized (or is commercially purchased crystallized) can be returned to a liquid state by warming. Despite a common misconception, honey crystallizing does not mean it has expired.
- Pasteurized honey has been heated in a pasteurization process which requires temperatures of 72 °C (161 °F) or higher. Pasteurization destroys yeast cells. It also liquefies any microcrystals in the honey, which delays the onset of visible crystallization. However, excessive heat exposure also results in product deterioration, as it increases the level of hydroxymethylfurfural (HMF) and reduces enzyme (e.g. diastase) activity. Heat also darkens the honey, and affects taste and fragrance.
- Raw honey is as it exists in the beehive or as obtained by extraction, settling, or straining, without adding heat (although some honey that has been "minimally processed" is often labeled as raw honey). Raw honey contains some pollen and may contain small particles of wax.
- Strained honey has been passed through a mesh material to remove particulate material (pieces of wax, propolis, other defects) without removing pollen, minerals, or enzymes.
- Filtered honey of any type has been filtered to the extent that all or most of the fine particles, pollen grains, air bubbles, or other materials normally found in suspension, have been removed. The process typically heats honey to 66–77 °C (150–170 °F) to more easily pass through the filter. Filtered honey is very clear and will not crystallize as quickly, making it preferred by supermarkets. The most common method involves the addition of diatomaceous earth to honey that is heated to 60 °C (140 °F) and passed through filter paper or canvas until a cake of diatomaceous earth builds up on the filter.
- Ultrasonicated honey has been processed by ultrasonication, a nonthermal processing alternative for honey. When honey is exposed to ultrasonication, most of the yeast cells are destroyed. Those cells that survive sonication generally lose their ability to grow, which reduces the rate of honey fermentation substantially. Ultrasonication also eliminates existing crystals and inhibits further crystallization in honey. Ultrasonically aided liquefaction can work at substantially lower temperatures around 35 °C (95 °F) and can reduce liquefaction time to less than 30 seconds.
- Creamed honey, also called whipped honey, spun honey, churned honey, honey fondant, and, in the UK, set honey, has been processed to control crystallization. Creamed honey contains a large number of small crystals, which prevent the formation of larger crystals that can occur in unprocessed honey. The processing also produces a honey with a smooth, spreadable consistency.
- Dried honey has the moisture extracted from liquid honey to create completely solid, nonsticky granules. This process may or may not include the use of drying and anticaking agents. Dried honey is used in baked goods, and to garnish desserts.
- Comb honey is still in the honey bees' wax comb. It is traditionally collected using standard wooden frames in honey supers. The frames are collected and the comb is cut out in chunks before packaging. As an alternative to this labor-intensive method, plastic rings or cartridges can be used that do not require manual cutting of the comb, and speed packaging. Comb honey harvested in the traditional manner is also referred to as "cut-comb honey".
- Chunk honey is packed in wide-mouthed containers; it consists of one or more pieces of comb honey immersed in extracted liquid honey.
- Honey decoctions are made from honey or honey byproducts which have been dissolved in water, then reduced (usually by means of boiling). Other ingredients may then be added. (For example, abbamele has added citrus.) The resulting product may be similar to molasses.
- Baker's honey is outside the normal specification for honey, due to a "foreign" taste or odor, or because it has begun to ferment or has been overheated. It is generally used as an ingredient in food processing. Additional requirements exist for labeling baker's honey, including that it may not be sold labeled simply as "honey".

=== Grading ===
Countries have differing standards for grading honey. In the US, honey grading is performed voluntarily based upon USDA standards. USDA offers inspection and grading "as on-line (in-plant) or lot inspection...upon application, on a fee-for-service basis." Honey is graded based upon a number of factors, including water content, flavor and aroma, absence of defects, and clarity. Honey is also classified by color, though it is not a factor in the grading scale.

The USDA honey grade scale is:

Grade	Soluble solids	Flavor and aroma	Absence of defects	Clarity
A	≥ 81.4%	Good "has a good, normal flavor and aroma for the predominant floral source or, when blended, a good flavor for the blend of floral sources and the honey is free from caramelized flavor or objectionable flavor caused by fermentation, smoke, chemicals, or other causes with the exception of the predominant floral source"	Practically free "contains practically no defects that affect the appearance or edibility of the product"	Clear "may contain air bubbles which do not materially affect the appearance of the product and may contain a trace of pollen grains or other finely divided particles of suspended material which do not affect the appearance of the product"
B	≥ 81.4%	Reasonably good "has a reasonably good, normal flavor and aroma for the predominant floral source or, when blended, a reasonably good flavor for the blend of floral sources and the honey is practically free from caramelized flavor and is free from objectionable flavor caused by fermentation, smoke, chemicals, or other causes with the exception of the predominant floral source"	Reasonably free "may contain defects which do not materially affect the appearance or edibility of the product"	Reasonably clear "may contain air bubbles, pollen grains, or other finely divided particles of suspended material which do not materially affect the appearance of the product"
C	≥ 80.0%	Fairly good "has a fairly good, normal flavor and aroma for the predominant floral source or, when blended, a fairly good flavor for the blend of floral sources and the honey is reasonably free from caramelized flavor and is free from objectionable flavor caused by fermentation, smoke, chemicals, or other causes with the exception of the predominant floral source"	Fairly free "may contain defects which do not seriously affect the appearance or edibility of the product"	Fairly clear "may contain air bubbles, pollen grains, or other finely divided particles of suspended material which do not seriously affect the appearance of the product"
Substandard	Fails Grade C	Fails Grade C	Fails Grade C	Fails Grade C

India certifies honey grades based on additional factors, such as the Fiehe's test, and other empirical measurements.

=== Indicators of quality ===
High-quality honey can be distinguished by fragrance, taste, and consistency. Ripe, freshly collected, high-quality honey at 20 °C (68 °F) should flow from a knife in a straight stream, without breaking into separate drops. After falling down, the honey should form a bead. The honey, when poured, should form small, temporary layers that disappear fairly quickly, indicating high viscosity. If not, it indicates honey with excessive water content of over 20%, not suitable for long-term preservation.

In jars, fresh honey should appear as a pure, consistent fluid, and should not set in layers. Within a few weeks to a few months of extraction, many varieties of honey crystallize into a cream-colored solid. Some varieties of honey, including tupelo, acacia, and sage, crystallize less regularly. Honey may be heated during bottling at temperatures of 40–49 °C (104–120 °F) to delay or inhibit crystallization. Overheating is indicated by change in enzyme levels, for instance, diastase activity, which can be determined with the Schade or the Phadebas methods. A fluffy film on the surface of the honey (like a white foam), or marble-colored or white-spotted crystallization on a container's sides, is formed by air bubbles trapped during the bottling process.

A 2008 Italian study determined that nuclear magnetic resonance spectroscopy can be used to distinguish between different honey types, and can be used to pinpoint the area where it was produced. Researchers were able to identify differences in acacia and polyfloral honeys by the differing proportions of fructose and sucrose, as well as differing levels of aromatic amino acids phenylalanine and tyrosine. This ability allows greater ease of selecting compatible stocks.

== Nutrition ==
Honey
Nutritional value per 100 g (3.5 oz)
- Energy: 1,270 kJ (300 kcal)
- Carbohydrates: 82 g
- Sugars glucose fructose: 82 g 36 g 41 g
- Dietary fiber: 0.2 g
- Fat: 0 g
- Protein: 0.3 g
Vitamins and minerals
Vitamins	Quantity %DV^{†}
Riboflavin (B2)	3% 0.038 mg
Niacin (B3)	1% 0.121 mg
Pantothenic acid (B5)	1% 0.068 mg
Vitamin B6	1% 0.024 mg
Folate (B9)	1% 2 μg
Vitamin C	1% 0.5 mg
Minerals	Quantity %DV^{†}
Calcium	0% 6 mg
Iron	2% 0.42 mg
Magnesium	0% 2 mg
Phosphorus	0% 4 mg
Potassium	2% 52 mg
Sodium	0% 4 mg
Zinc	2% 0.22 mg
- Other constituents: Quantity
- Water: 17 g
- Full Link to USDA Database entry
- ^{†}Percentages estimated using US recommendations for adults, except for potassium, which is estimated based on expert recommendation from the National Academies.

Honey is 17% water and 82% carbohydrates, and has negligible content of dietary fiber and protein, while containing no fat (table). Honey supplies no micronutrients in significant content (table). In a reference amount of 100 g (3.5 oz), honey supplies 300 calories.

=== Sugar profile ===
Honey is mainly fructose (51% of sugars) and glucose (44%) (table), with remaining sugars including galactose, maltose, and sucrose, each supplying 3% or less of total sugars (table, USDA reference).

The glycemic index of honey has a possible range of 31–78, depending on the variety.

The specific composition, color, aroma, and flavor of any batch of honey depend on the flowers foraged by bees that produced the honey.

== History ==
Honey seeker depicted in an 8000-year-old cave painting at Coves de L'Aranya, Bicorp in València

Honey collection is an ancient activity, long preceding the honey bee's domestication; this traditional practice is known as honey hunting. A Mesolithic rock painting in a cave in Valencia, Spain, dating back at least 8,000 years, depicts two honey foragers collecting honey and honeycomb from a wild bees' nest. The figures are depicted carrying baskets or gourds, and using a ladder or series of ropes to reach the nest. Humans followed the greater honeyguide bird to wild beehives; this behavior may have evolved with early hominids. The oldest known honey remains were found in Georgia during the construction of the Baku–Tbilisi–Ceyhan pipeline: archaeologists found honey remains on the inner surface of clay vessels unearthed in an ancient tomb, dating back between 4,700 and 5,500 years. In ancient Georgia, several types of honey were buried with a person for journeys into the afterlife, including linden, berry, and meadow-flower varieties.

The first written records of beekeeping are from ancient Egypt, where honey was used to sweeten cakes, biscuits, and other foods and as a base for unguents in Egyptian hieroglyphs. The dead were often buried in or with honey in Egypt, Mesopotamia and other regions. Bees were kept at temples to produce honey for temple offerings, mummification and other uses.

In southern Illyria (present day Albania), the Iron Age Illyrian tribe of the Abroi were known for preparing mead, a wine from honey, as documented by Hecataeus of Miletus in the 6th century BCE.

In ancient Greece, honey was produced from the Archaic to the Hellenistic periods. In 594 BCE, beekeeping around Athens was so widespread that Solon passed a law about it: "He who sets up hives of bees must put them 300 feet [90 metres] away from those already installed by another". Greek archaeological excavations of pottery located ancient hives. According to Columella, Greek beekeepers of the Hellenistic period did not hesitate to move their hives over rather long distances to maximize production, taking advantage of the different vegetative cycles in different regions. The spiritual and supposed therapeutic use of honey in ancient India was documented in both the Vedas and the Ayurveda texts.

== Religious significance ==
In ancient Greek religion, the food of Zeus and the twelve Gods of Olympus was honey in the form of nectar and ambrosia.

In the Hebrew Bible, the Promised Land (Canaan, the Land of Israel) is described 16 times as "the land of milk and honey" as a metaphor for its bounty. Of the 55 times the word "honey" appears in the Hebrew Bible, 16 are part of the expression "the land of milk and honey", and only twice is "honey" explicitly associated with bees, both being related to wild bees. Modern biblical researchers long considered that the original Hebrew word used in the Bible (דבש, devash) refers to the sweet syrup produced from figs or dates, because the domestication of the honey bee was completely undocumented through archaeology anywhere in the ancient Near East (excluding Egypt) at the time associated with the earlier biblical narratives (books of Exodus, Judges, Kings, etc.). In 2005, however, an apiary dating from the 10th century BC was found in Tel Rehov, Israel that contained 100 hives, estimated to produce half a ton of honey annually. This was, as of 2007, the only such finding made by archaeologists in the entire ancient Near East region, and it opens the possibility that biblical honey was indeed bee honey.

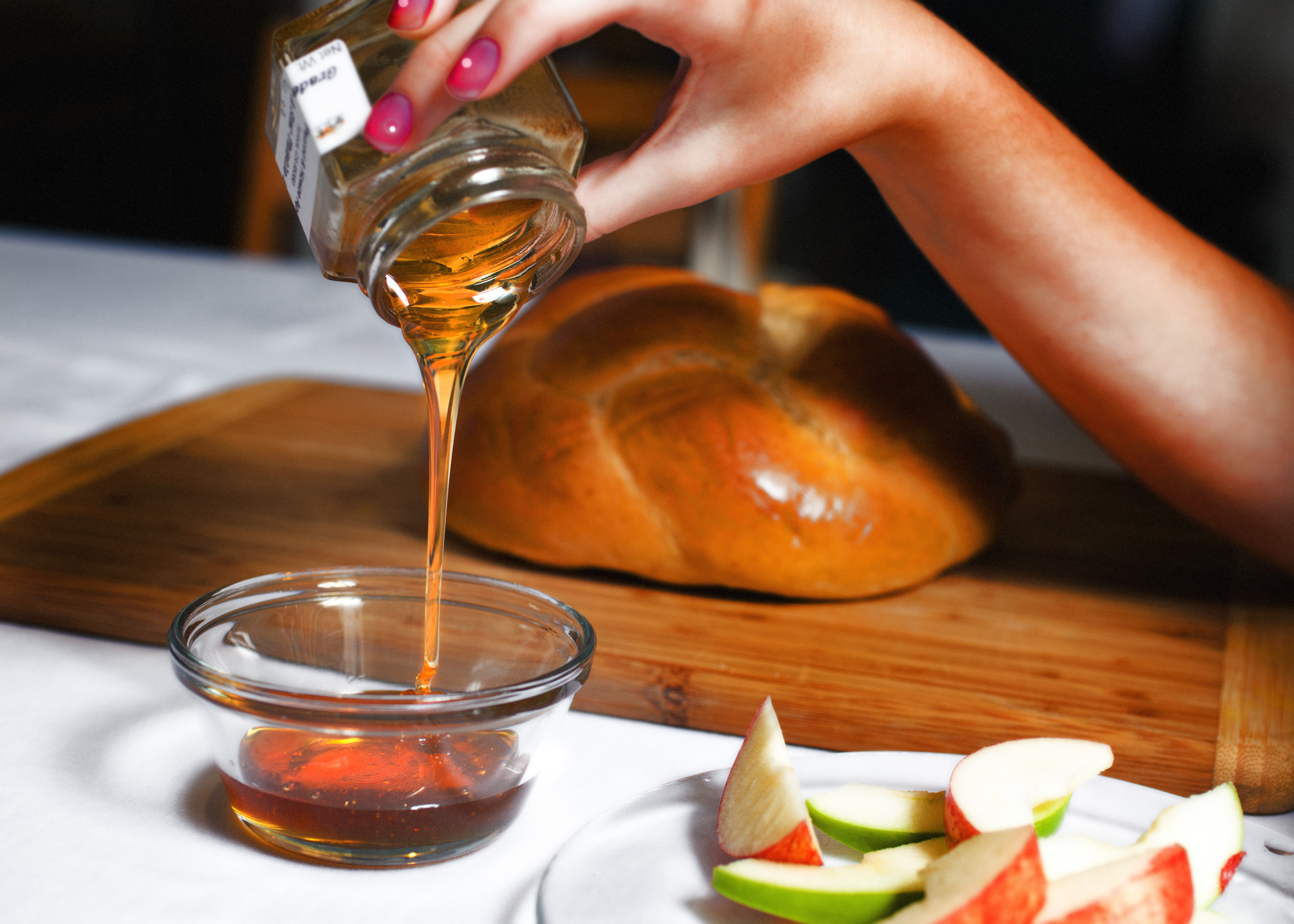
In Judaism, honey symbolizes the sweetness of the New Year, Rosh Hashanah, and is traditionally eaten with apple slices.

In Jewish tradition, honey is a symbol for the new year, Rosh Hashanah. At the traditional meal for that holiday, apple slices are dipped in honey and eaten to bring a sweet new year. Some Rosh Hashanah greetings show honey and an apple, symbolizing the feast. In some congregations, small straws of honey are given out to usher in the new year. Pure honey is considered kosher (permitted to be eaten by religious Jews), though it is produced by a flying insect, a non-kosher creature; eating other products of non-kosher animals is forbidden. It belongs among the parve (neutral) foods, containing neither meat nor dairy products and allowed to be eaten together with either.

Early Christians used honey as a symbol of spiritual perfection in christening ceremonies.

In Islam, an entire chapter (Surah) in the Quran is called an-Nahl (the Bees). According to his teachings (hadith), Muhammad strongly recommended honey for healing purposes. The Quran promotes honey as a nutritious and healthy food, saying:

And thy Lord taught the Bee to build its cells in hills, on trees, and in (men's) habitations; Then to eat of all the produce (of the earth), and find with skill the spacious paths of its Lord: there issues from within their bodies a drink of varying colours, wherein is healing for men: verily in this is a Sign for those who give thought.

In Hinduism, honey (Madhu) is one of the five elixirs of life (Panchamrita). In temples, honey is poured over the deities in a ritual called Madhu abhisheka. The Vedas and other ancient literature mention the use of honey as a great medicinal and health food.

In Buddhism, honey plays an important role in the festival of Madhu Purnima, celebrated in India and Bangladesh. The day commemorates Buddha's making peace among his disciples by retreating into the wilderness. According to legend, while he was there a monkey brought him honey to eat. On Madhu Purnima, Buddhists remember this act by giving honey to monks. The monkey's gift is frequently depicted in Buddhist art.

In Jainism, the consumption of honey is strictly prohibited. This dietary restriction is rooted in the religion's fundamental ethical principle of nonviolence (ahimsa). Traditional Jain theology classifies honey as one of the four absolute prohibitions (maha-vigai) because its commercial extraction and harvesting inevitably involve the violent disruption of hives and the death of bees. Furthermore, classical Jain biological texts assert that the dense, viscous nature of honey makes it a continuous breeding ground for microscopic lifeforms (nigoda). Consequently, Jainism mandates that consuming honey results in the continuous ingestion and destruction of these microorganisms, rendering it a severe karmic violation.

== Popular culture ==
Honey is especially associated with Winnie-the-Pooh, and Bamse's thunder honey.

== See also ==
- Bee pollen – Ball of pollen gathered by worker honeybees
- Honey hunting – Collection of honey from wild bee colonies
- Mellivory – Consumption of honey
- Monofloral honey – Honey from the nectar of one plant species
- More Than Honey – 2012 Swiss documentary film by Markus Imhoof
- National Honey Show – UK food festival
- Royal jelly – Secretion from the glands of nurse bees
- Vegan honey

== Bibliography ==
- Chapple, Christopher Key (1993), Nonviolence to Animals, Earth, and Self in Asian Traditions, State University of New York Press
- Crane, Eva, ed. (1975). Honey: A Comprehensive Survey. London: Heinemann. ISBN 9780434902705.
- Crane, Eva (1980). A Book of Honey. New York: Charles Scribner's Sons. ISBN 9780684166513. OCLC 7172738.
- Jaini, Padmanabh S. (1998) [1979], The Jain Path of Purification, Delhi: Motilal Banarsidass, ISBN 978-81-208-1578-0
- Krell, R. (1996). Value-added products from beekeeping. Food and Agriculture Organization of the United Nations. p. 5. ISBN 978-92-5-103819-2.
- Root, A. I.; Root, E. R. (2005) [1879]. The ABC and XYZ of Bee Culture. Kessinger Publishing. ISBN 978-1-4179-2427-1.
