= Fondant (disambiguation) =

Fondant is a mixture of sugar and water used as a confection, filling, or icing.

It may also refer to:

- Chocolate fondant, a type of dessert (usually cake) with a molten centre
- Fondant icing, a type of chalky icing commonly used on decorative cakes
- Poured fondant a type of liquid fondant used to fill chocolates
- Fondant potatoes, also known as pommes fondant, a method of preparing potatoes
- Honey fondant, creamed honey
