= Creamed honey =

Honey with hindered crystallization

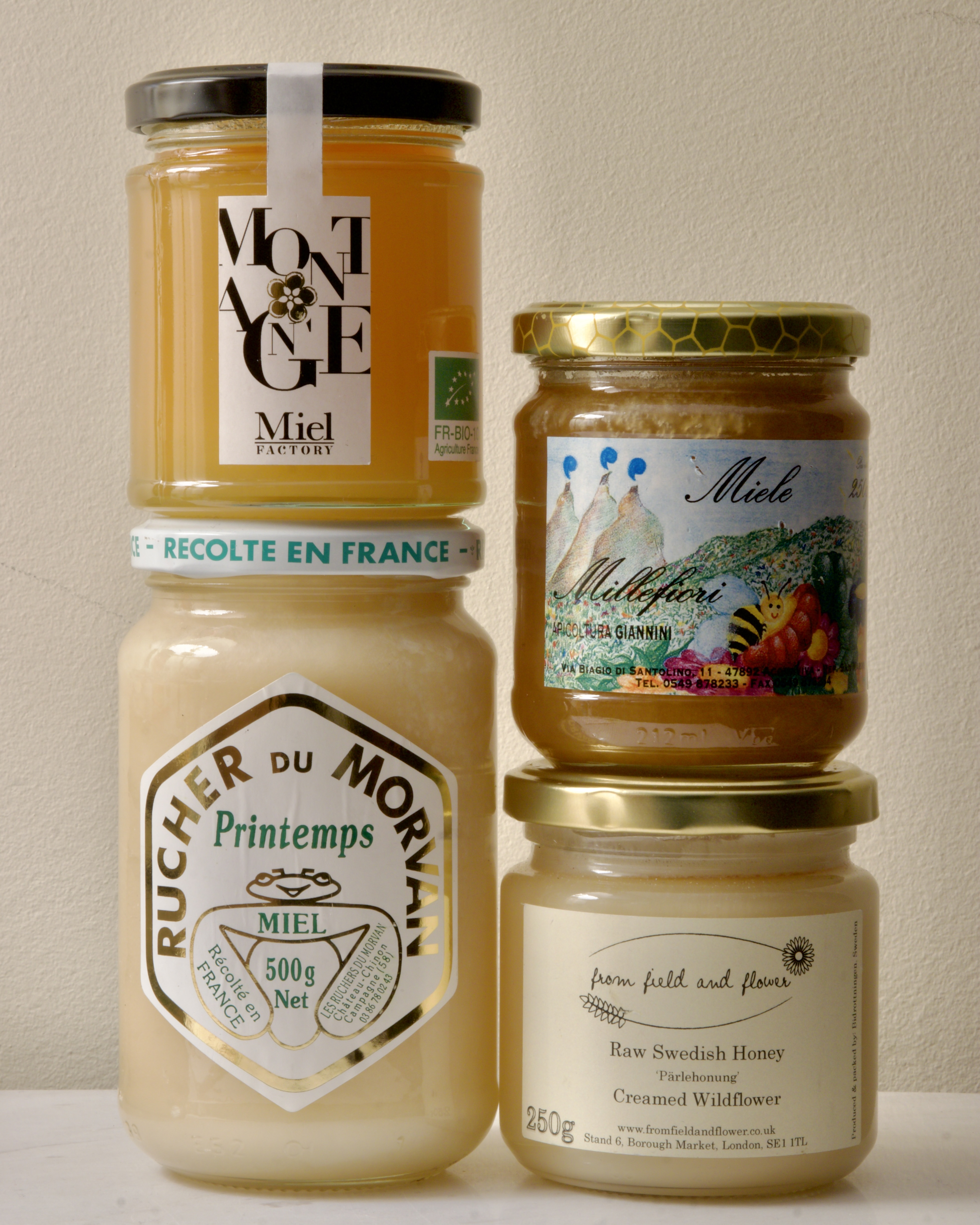
Selection of creamed honey in jars

Creamed honey is honey that has been processed to control crystallization. Also known as honey fondant, soft set honey, or whipped honey, it has a smooth, spreadable consistency and lighter color than liquid honey of the same floral type. A method for producing creamed honey was first patented in 1935, and other methods have since been devised.

== Description ==
Creamed honey contains a large number of small crystals, which prevent the formation of larger crystals that can occur in unprocessed honey. The processing also produces a honey with a smooth spreadable consistency. Because it is the glucose that crystallizes in the honey, and because glucose crystals are naturally pure white, creamed honey is always lighter-colored than liquid honey of the same floral type.

Creamed honey stays in its creamy consistency indefinitely if stored at approximately 65 °F (18 °C).

== Production methods ==
- The Dyce Method

Creamed honey was developed by Elton J. Dyce in the early 1930s. In the key production step, microscopic seed crystals are added to liquid honey. Then paddles intermittently stir the honey mixture while it is kept between 55–70 °F (13–21 °C); creaming completes in 2–3 days. Dyce used the high heat of pasteurization to ensure that his honey source did not already contain crystals too large for the process, but modern techniques instead use fresh raw, liquid honey at a ratio of 1:10 or larger. The latter yields a batch of creamed honey in approximately 80 hours.

- Variations on the Dyce Method

Instead of pasteurization, fresh honey that has not yet crystallized can be used. Using the fresh honey keeps the naturally present enzymes intact, while pasteurization will denature the enzymes. All other steps remain the same as listed in the Dyce Method.
