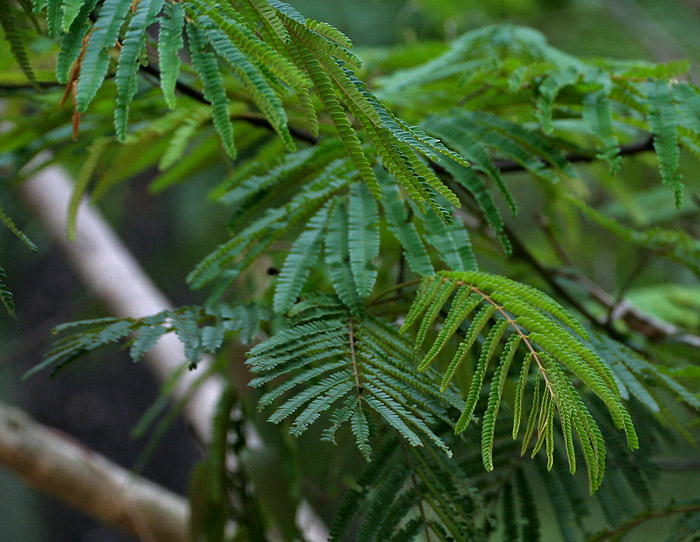

Scientific classification
- Kingdom: Plantae
- Clade: Tracheophytes
- Clade: Angiosperms
- Clade: Eudicots
- Clade: Rosids
- Order: Fabales
- Family: Fabaceae
- Subfamily: Caesalpinioideae
- Clade: Mimosoid clade
- Genus: Senegalia
- Species: S. pennata

Binomial name
- Senegalia pennata (L.) Maslin

Synonyms
- Acacia pennata (L.) Willd.

= Senegalia pennata =

Species of legume

Senegalia pennata (English: climbing wattle, Vietnamese: rau thối, Thai: ชะอม cha-om, Northeastern Thai: ผักขา phak kha, Northern Thai: ผักหละ phak la, Burmese: ဆူးပုပ်, pronounced [sʰúboʊʔ]; Khmer: ស្អំ; Meiteilon : khang, Thadou-Kuki: khang-khu, Paite Language: Khangkhuh, Mizo: Khanghu, Hmar: khanghmuk,Vaiphei: Khangkhu, Biate: khang-hu, Malay: petai duri or petai siam), is a species of plant which is native to South and Southeast Asia. It is a shrub or small tropical tree which grows up to 5 metres (16 ft) in height. Its leaves are bipinnate with linear-oblong and glabrous pinnules. Its yellowish flowers are terminal panicles with globose heads. The pods are thin, flat and long with thick sutures.

== Uses ==
=== Culinary ===
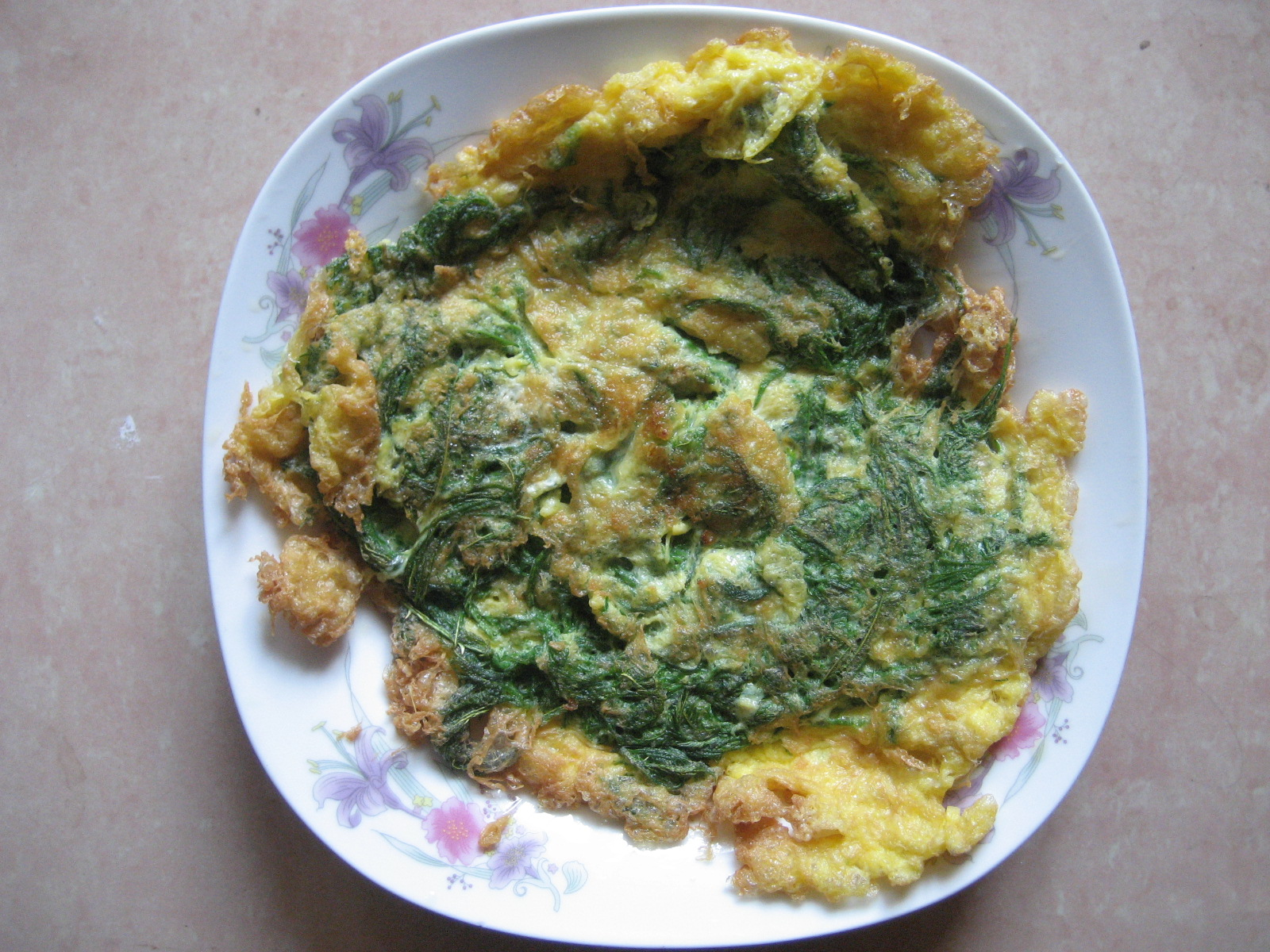
Cha-om omelette; a popular Thai and Burmese dish

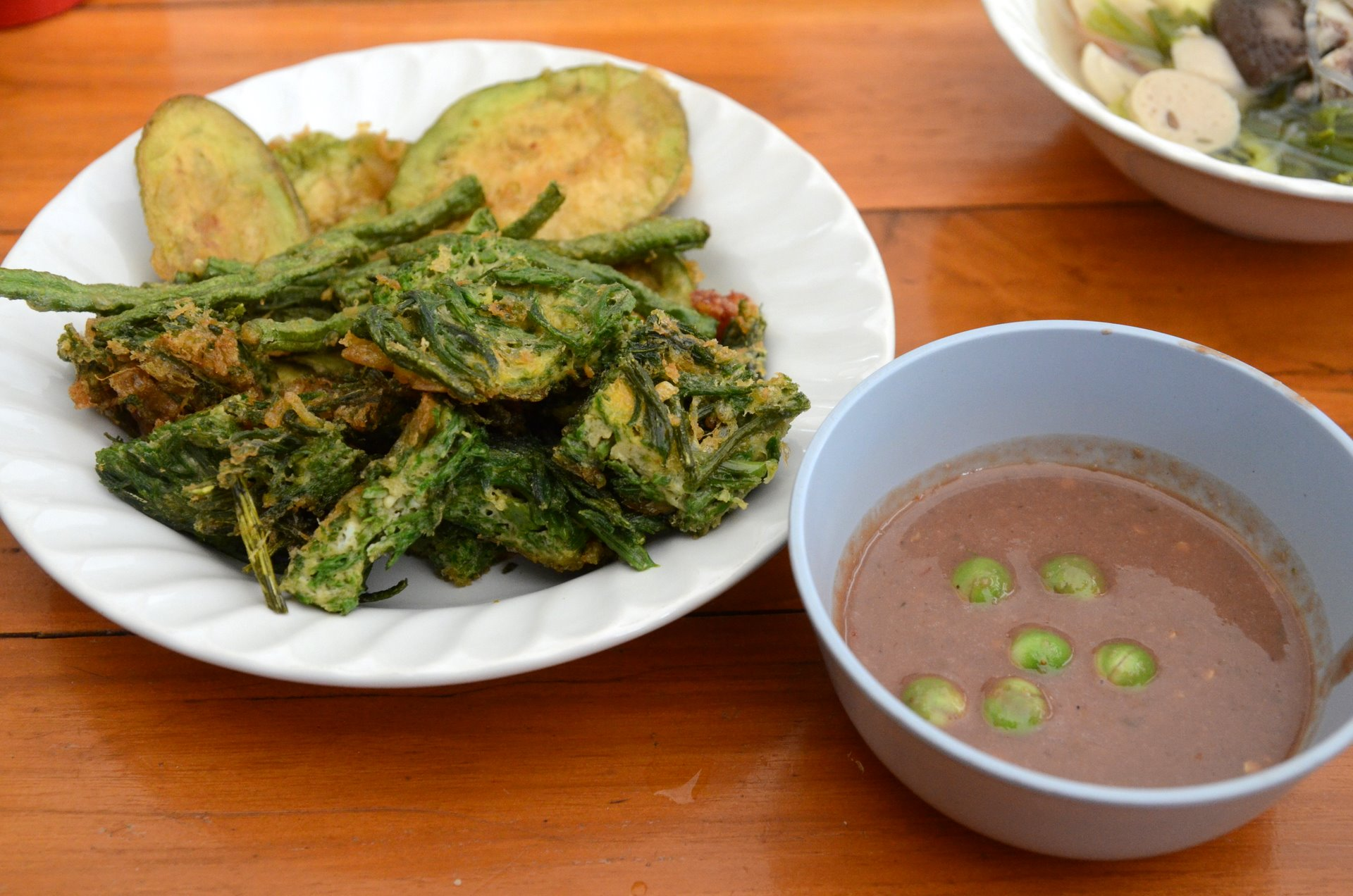
Thai cuisine. Deep-fried cha-om leaves with Nam phrik kapi

In Northeast India, in the states of Mizoram and Manipur, climbing wattle is an ingredient in indigenous cuisine like kaang-hou (fried vegetables) and eromba. The plant is locally known as khanghmuk in Hmar, khang in Meiteilon and khanghu in Mizo.

In Burma, Cambodia, Laos, and Thailand, the feathery shoots of Senegalia pennata are used in soups, curries, omelettes and stir-fries. The edible shoots are picked before they become tough and thorny.

In Northern Thai cuisine, cha-om is also eaten raw with Thai salads, such as tam mamuang (mango salad), and it is one of the ingredients of kaeng khae curry. In Central Thailand and Isan it is usually boiled or fried. Cha-om omelet pieces are one of the usual ingredients of nam phrik pla thu and commonly used in kaeng som, a sour Thai curry.

In Vietnam, the plant is cultivated in the Northwest region such as Sơn La and Lai Châu provinces, by the Thái and Khơ Mú ethnic groups as a delicacy vegetable. The leaves have a distinctive pungent, vegetal, slightly sulfurous odor, and are used in salads (especially with mountain ebony flowers - Bauhinia variegata), as well as in stir-fries, grilled fish, pork or buffalo dishes.

== See also ==
- List of plants with edible leaves
- Thai cuisine
- Lao cuisine
- Flora of Madhya Pradesh
- List of ingredients in Burmese cuisine
- List of Thai ingredients
