= Edible plant stem =

Vegetable type

Edible plant stems are a part of plants eaten by humans. Most plants are made up of stems, roots, leaves, flowers, and produce fruits containing seeds. Humans most commonly eat the seeds (e.g. maize, wheat), fruit (e.g. tomato, avocado, banana), flowers (e.g. broccoli), leaves (e.g. lettuce, spinach, and cabbage), roots (e.g. carrots, beets), and stems (e.g. asparagus) of many plants. There are also a few edible petioles (also known as leaf stems) such as celery or rhubarb.

Plant stems have a variety of functions. Stems support the entire plant and have buds, leaves, flowers, and fruits. Stems are also a vital connection between leaves and roots. They conduct water and mineral nutrients through xylem tissue from roots upward, and organic compounds and some mineral nutrients through phloem tissue in any direction within the plant. Apical meristems, located at the shoot tip and axillary buds on the stem, allow plants to increase in length, surface, and mass. In some plants, such as cactus, stems are specialized for photosynthesis and water storage.

== List of edible plant stems ==
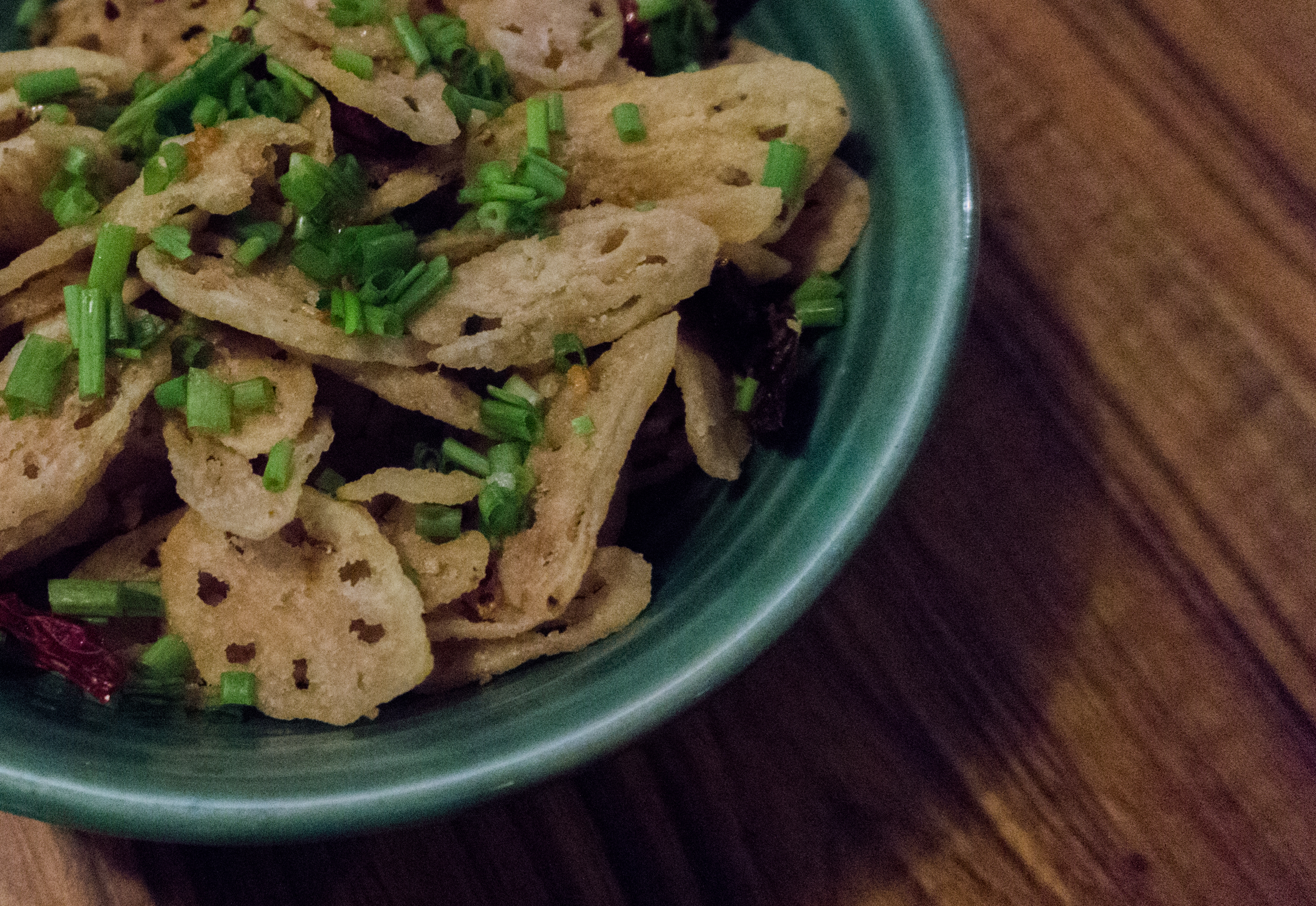
Crispy lotus stem garnished with chives

Asparagus
The edible portion is the rapidly emerging stems that arise from the crowns in the

Bamboo
The edible portion is the young shoot (culm).

Birch
Trunk sap is drunk as a tonic or rendered into birch syrup, vinegar, beer, soft drinks, and other foods.

Broccoli
The edible portion is the peduncle stem tissue, flower buds, and some small leaves.

Cauliflower
The edible portion is proliferated peduncle and flower tissue.

Cinnamon
Many favor the unique sweet flavor of the inner bark of cinnamon, and it is commonly used as a spice.

Fig
The edible portion is stem tissue. The fig "fruit" is actually an inverted flower cluster with both the male and female flower parts enclosed inside the base of the inflorescence, corresponding to the peduncle.

Ginger root
The edible portion is a branched underground compressed stem also referred to as a rhizome.

Kohlrabi
The edible portion is an enlarged (swollen) hypocotyl. It is a member of the cabbage family and is white, green, or purple in color.

Lotus root
The edible portion is a stem modified for underwater growth. Buds and branches are visible on the vegetable sold as lotus root.

Potato
The edible portion is a rhizome (an underground stem) that is also a tuber. The "eyes" of the potato are lateral buds. Potatoes come in white, yellow, orange, or purple-colored varieties.

Sugar cane
The edible portion is the inner stalk (stem) whose sap is a source of sugar. In its raw form chewing or extraction through a juicer extracts its juice.

Sugar maple
Xylem sap from the tree trunks is made into maple sugar and maple syrup.

Taro
The edible portion is the underground stem (corm).

Wasabi
In addition to its edible stem, the leaves and rhizomes of the plant are edible. It has an interesting spicy taste.

White pine
The sweet inner bark (phloem) was eaten by Native Americans.

== Wild plants ==
There are also many wild edible plant stems. In North America, these include the shoots of woodsorrel (usually eaten along with the leaves), chickweeds, galinsoga, common purslane, Japanese knotweed, winter cress and other wild mustards, thistles (de-thorned), stinging nettles (cooked), bellworts, violets, amaranth and slippery elm, among many others. Also, some wild plants with edible rhizomes (underground, horizontal stems) can be found, such as arrowhead or cattail. Wild edible stems, like their domestic relatives, are usually only good when young and growing. Many of these also require preparation (as do many domestic plants, such as the potato), so it is wise to read up on the plant before experimenting with eating it.

== Modified stems ==
Typical stems are located above ground, but there are modified stems that can be found either above or below ground. Modified stems located above ground are phylloids, stolons, runners, or spurs. Modified stems located below ground are corms, rhizomes, and tubers.

== Sources and external links ==
- Albuquerque Master Gardeners. (2005, May 23). Basic Plant Science (Botany). Retrieved July 15, 2005, from www.nmmastergardeners.org/Manual%20etc/Supplementfiles/Botany.htm
- Hershey, D. (2001, May 4). Re: What plant parts do we eat?. Message posted to www.madsci.org
- Lineberger, D. (spring 2005). Aggie Horticulture’s edible botany. Retrieved July 15, 2005, from aggie-horticulture.tamu.edu/syllabi/201h/ediblebotany/index.html
- McEachern, G. R. (1996, December 9). Figs. Retrieved July 15, 2005, from aggie-horticulture.tamu.edu/extension/fruit/figs/figs.html
- Oregon State University Extension Service. (1999). Master Gardener Handbook: external plant parts—stems. Retrieved July 15, 2005, from extension.oregonstate.edu/mg/botany/stems6.html
- Wilson, H. D. (1998, July 7). Plants and People—Botany 328, Lab 1—Plant Vegetative Morphology and Vegetables. Retrieved July 15, 2005, from www.csdl.tamu.edu/FLORA/Wilson/pp/su98/veglablist.htm
- Institute for the Study of Edible Wild Plants & Other Foragables Link
