= List of Korean ingredients =

This is a list of ingredients found in Korean cuisine.

== Meat ==
Name Local name	Image	Region	Usage	Description
Beef				Beef is the most prized of all meats by Koreans. Beef is prepared in numerous ways today including roasting or grilling (gui), boiling in soups.
Chicken				Chicken has played an important role as a protein and all parts of the chicken are used in Korean cuisine, including the gizzards, liver, and feet. Young chicken are braised in a medicinal soups eaten during the summer months to combat heat called samgyetang.
Chitterlings				
Deer meat				
Dog meat				
Duck meat				
Egg (food)				
Gizzard				
Goat meat				
Gopchang				
Makchang				
Pheasant				
Pork				
Quail				
Tree sparrow				
Wild Boar				

== Grains ==
Name Local name	Image	Region	Usage	Description
Barley				
Buckwheat				
Glutinous rice				
Yulmu (Coix lacryma-jobi var. ma-yuen)				
Millet				
Rice				
Sorghum				
Wheat				
Wheat gluten (food)				

== Fruits ==
Name Local name	Image	Region	Usage	Description
Apricot				
Corylus heterophylla var. thunbergii				
Grape				
Jujube				
Korean cherry				
Persimmon				
Platycodon grandiflorus				
Plum				
Pomegranate				
Prunus mume				
Pyrus pyrifolia				
Prunus tomentosa				
Strawberry				
Tomato				
Water melon				
Wolfberry				

== See also ==
- Korean cuisine
