= List of ingredients in Burmese cuisine =

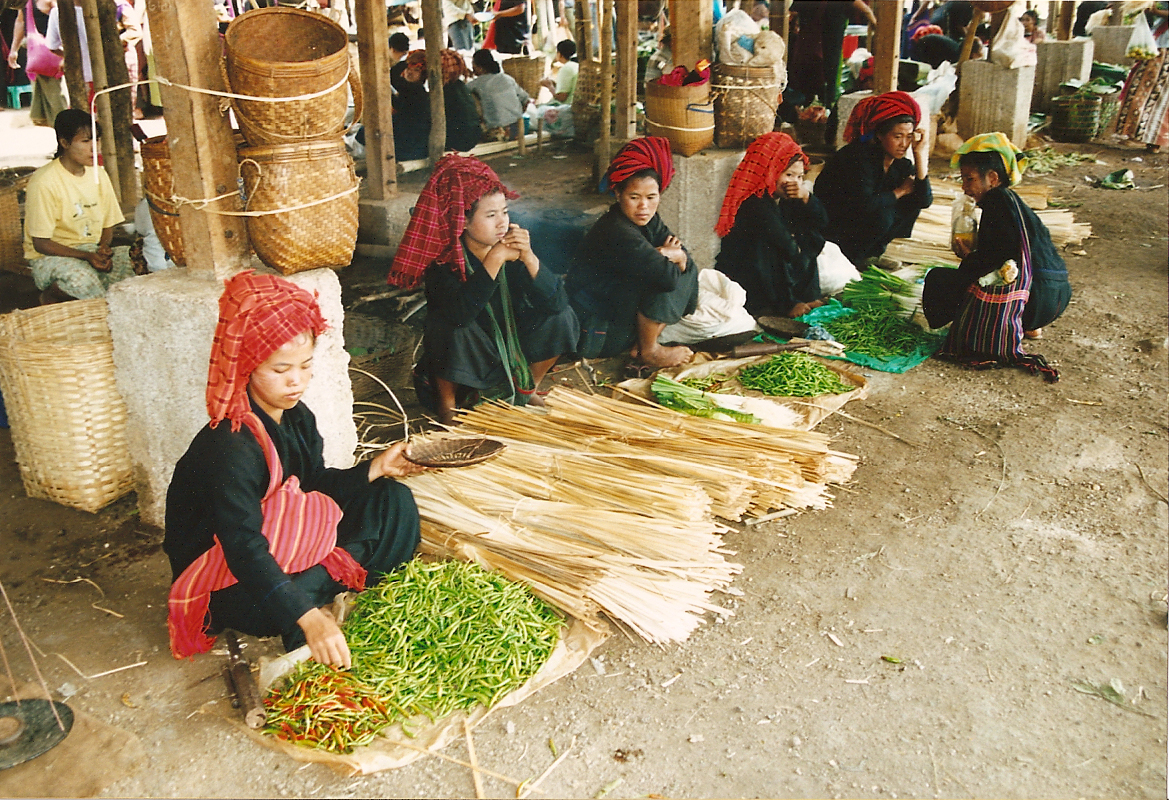
Pa-O women selling vegetables

The following is a list of ingredients used in Burmese cuisine. Burmese cuisine utilizes a wide array of vegetables and fruits. Due to influences from India and China, most Burmese dishes use a much wider variety of ingredients than the Indian or Chinese cuisines.

Ingredients used in Burmese dishes are often fresh. Many fruits are used in conjunction with vegetables in many dishes. The Burmese eat a great variety of vegetables and fruits, and many kinds of meat.

== Herbs and spices ==
=== Fresh herbs and spices ===
- Sweet basil (ပင်စိမ်းမွှေး)
- Cha-om, Acacia pennata leaves (ဆူးပုပ်ရွက်)
- Garlic (ကြက်သွန်ဖြူ)
- Ginger (ချင်း)
- Chili (ငရုတ်သီး အစိမ်း/အခြောက်), dried as well as green
- Chinese chives (ဂျူးမြစ်)
- Galangal (ပတဲကော)
- Green onions (ကြက်သွန်မြိတ်)
- Coriander / cilantro (နံနံပင်)
- Curry leaf (ပျဉ်းတော်သိမ်)
- Culantro (မာလာဖူး)
- Lemongrass (စပါးလင်)
- Kaffir lime leaves (ရှောက်ရွက်)
- Mint (ပူဒီနာ)
- Mustard leaf (မုန်ညှင်းရွက်)
- Onion (ကြက်သွန်နီ )
- Pandan (ဆွမ်းမွှေးရွက်)
- Black pepper (ငရုတ်ကောင်း)
- Tamarind (မန်ကျည်း)
- Senegalia rugata (ကင်ပွန်းချဉ်)

=== Dried herbs and spices ===
- Aniseed (စမုန်စပါး)
- Bay leaf (ကရဝေးရွက်)
- Black cumin (စမုန်နက်)
- Cardamom (ဖာလာစေ့)
- Cinnamon (သစ်ဂျပိုး)
- Cloves (လေးညှင်းပွင့်)
- Cumin (ဇီယာ)
- Five spice powder (တရုတ်မဆလာ)
- Fenugreek
- Liquorice root powder (နွယ်ချိုမှုန့်)
- Masala (မဆလာမှုန့်)
- Paprika (အရောင်တင်မှုန့် or ငရုတ်သီးမှုန့်)
- Peanut (မြေပဲ)
- Perilla seed (ရှမ်းနှမ်းစေ့)
- Poppy seed (ဘိန်းစေ့)
- Sesame seeds (နှမ်း)
- Turmeric (နနွင်း)

== Pastes, sauces, and condiments ==
- Ngapi (စိမ်းစား ငပိ/မျှင်ငပိ) - fermented fish paste
- Fish sauce (ငံပြာရည်)
- Pon ye gyi (ပုန်းရည်ကြီး), a fermented horse gram bean paste
- Pe ngapi (ပဲငါးပိ), fermented soybean paste
- Fermented bean sprouts (ပဲတီချဉ်)
- Fermented sesame cake (နှမ်းဖက်ချဉ်)
- Fish paste (ရေကြိုငပိ or ငပိရေကြိုရာတွင်သုံးသော ငပိ)
- Fermented bean cake (ပဲဖက်ချဉ်)
- Shrimp paste, belacan (စိမ်းစားငပိ/မျှင်ငပိ)
- Soy sauce (ပဲငံပြာရည်)

== Vegetables ==
- Asiatic pennywort, Gotu Kola, Centella asiatica (မြင်းခွာရွက်)
- asparagus (ကညွှတ်)
- mung bean sprouts (ပဲပင်ပေါက်)
- bitter gourd (ကြက်ဟင်းခါးသီး)
- cabbage (ဂေါ်ဖီထုပ်)
- carrot (ခါကြက်ဥနီ)
- cauliflower (ပန်းဂေါ်ဖီ/ပန်းပွင့်)
- chayote (ဂေါ်ရခါးသီး)
- Chinese cabbage (မုန်ညှင်းဖြူ)
- cucumber (သခွားသီး)
- Daikon or white radish (မုံလာဥဖြူ), pickled (မုံလာဥချဉ်)
- drumstick, Moringa oleifera (ဒန့်သလွန်သီး)
- eggplant (ခရမ်းသီး)
- gourd (ဘူးသီး) and the young vine (ဘူးညွှန့်)
- green bean (ပဲတောင့်ရှည်)
- Gai lan (ကိုက်လန်)
- lettuce (ဆလတ်ရွက်)
- mustard greens (မုံညှင်းရွက်), pickled (မုံညှင်းချဉ်)
- haricot bean (ပဲကြီး)
- neem leaves, margosa(တမာ ရွက်)
- okra, lady's finger (ရုံးပတီသီး)
- Oroxylum indicum, Indian Trumpet fruit (ကြောင်လျှာသီး)
- plumeria alba (တရုတ်စကား)
- potato (အာလူး)
- pumpkin (ရွှေဖရုံသီး)
- ridged gourd (ခဝဲသီး)
- roselle leaves (ချဉ်ပေါင်ရွက်)
- snake gourd (ပဲလင်းမြွေသီး)
- Scallion Spring onions (ကြက်သွန်မြိတ်)
- sesbania grandiflora (ပေါက်ပန်းဖြူ)
- tindora (ကင်းပုံ)
- tomato (ခရမ်းချဉ်သီး)
- water spinach (ကန်စွန်းရွက်)
- winter melon (ကျောက်ဖရုံသီး)

=== Lentils ===
- Black-eyed pea (ပဲလွမ်း)
- Butter bean (ထောပတ်ပဲ)
- Chickpea (ကုလားပဲ [kələpɛ́])
- Chickpea flour (ပဲမှုန့် [pɛ́m̥o̰ʊɰ̃])
- Lablab bean (ပဲကြီး)
- Lentils (ပဲနီကလေး or ပဲရာဇာ)
- Urad dal, black lentil (မတ်ပဲ [maʔpɛ́])
- winged bean (ပဲစောင်းလျား)
- Yellow peas (pe pyote)

=== Roots ===
- Bamboo shoot (မျှစ်)
- banana stem (ငှက်ပျောအူ)
- Chinese chive roots (ဂျူးမြှစ်)
- Jicama (စိမ်းစားဥ)
- Sweet potato (ကန်စွန်းဥ)
- Taro corn (ပိန်းဥ)
- Galangal
- Ginger
- Liquorice root

=== Pickles ===
- sour fermented bamboo shoot (မျှစ်ချဉ်)
- sour fermented green mango, pressed(သရက်သီးသနပ်/သရက်ချဉ်)

== Oils ==
- Chili oil (ငရုတ်ဆီ)
- Si-Chet (ဆီချက်), toasted peanut oil that is often used to dress salads
- Peanut oil (ပဲဆီ [pɛ́zì]
- Sesame oil (နှမ်းဆီ [n̥áɰ̃zi])

== Staple foods and other starches ==
- Paw hsan hmwe ပေါ်ဆန်းမွေး
- Glutinous rice (ကောက်ညှင်း [kaʊʔɲ̊ɪ́ɰ̃]), purple variety (ငချိတ် [ŋət͡ɕʰeɪʔ])
- Rice flour (ဆန်မှုန့် [sʰã m̥oũʔ])
- Glutinous rice flour (ကောက်ညှင်းမှုန့်)
- Semolina (ရွှေချီမှုန့်)

== Edible fungi ==
- mushrooms (မှို [m̥ò])
- Tree fungi (မှိုခြောက်)
- Wood ear (အဖိုးကြီးနားရွက်)

== Fruits and nuts ==
- coconut (အုန်းသီး)
- djenkol (ဒိန်ညှင်း/တညှင်းသီး)
- kaffir lime (ရှောက်သီး)
- lime (သံပရာသီး)
- luffa (သပွတ်သီး)
- mango (သရက်သီး), green as well as ripe
- santol (သစ်တိုသီး)
- Myanma grape heritiera fomes (ကနစိုသီး)
- soap nut (ကင်ပွန်းသီး)
- water chestnut (ကျွဲခေါင်းသီး)
- rambutan (ကြက်မောက်သီး)
- betel-nut (ကွမ်းသီး)
- pomelo (ကျွဲကောသီး)
- star fruit (စောင်းလျားသီး)
- rose apple (ဇမ္ဗူသပြေသီး)
- persimmon (တည္သီး)
- avocado (ထောပတ်သီး)
- palm (ထန်းသီး)
- durian (ဒူးရင်းသီး)
- jack fruit (ပိန္နဲသီး)
- Terminalia (ဖန္ခါးသီး)
- almond ဗာဒံသီး (ဗန္ဒါသီး)
- eggplant (မရမ်းသီး)
- guava (မာလကာသီး)
- mangosteen (မင်းဂွတ်သီး)
- damson (မက်မန်းသီး)
- peach (မက္မံုသီး)
- morinda (ရဲယိုသီး)
- acorn (၀က္သစ္ခ်သီး)
- pomegranate (သလဲသီး)
- fig (သဖန်းသီး)
- sapota (သၾကားသီး)
- jump plum (သပြေသီး)
- papaya (သင်္ဘောသီး)
- wood apple (သီးသီး)
- star gooseberry (သင်္ဘောဆီးဖြူသီး)
- sugar apple (ဩဇာသီး)

== Meat and poultry ==
- beef (အမဲသား)
- chicken (ကြက်သား)
- duck (ဘဲသား)
- chicken/duck/quail egg (ကြက်ဥ/ဘဲဥ/ငုံးဥ)
- goat / mutton (ဆိတ်သား/သိုးသား)
- pork (ဝက်သား)
- Venison (အမဲလိုက်ခြင်းမှ ရရှိသော 'တော' ကောင်သား) - game Meat

== Fish and seafood ==
- Barramundi (ကကတစ်)
- catfish (ငါးခူ [ŋəkʰù])
- Daggertooth pike conger (ငါးရွှေ)
- eel (ငါးရှဉ့်)
- hilsa (ငါးသလောက်)
- mahseer (ငါးဒုတ်)
- mudfish (ငါးရံ့)
- Bronze featherback (ငါးဖယ်)
- Rohu (ငါးမြစ်ချင်း)
- Mrigal (ငါးချင်း)
- Prawn (ပုစွန်)
- Snapper (ငါးပါးနီ)

=== Processed seafood products ===
- bombay duck (အာပဲ့ခြောက်)
- dried fish (ငါးခြောက် [ŋa tʃʰauʔ])
- dried shrimp (ပုစွန်ခြောက် [bə zũ dʒauʔ])
- Salted fish (ငါးဆားနယ် or ငါးပိကောင်)
- Ngachin (ငါးချဉ်) - pickled fish, fermented and pressed
- Pickled shrimp (ပုစွန်ချဉ်) - pickled shrimp, fermented and pressed

== See also ==
- Cuisine of Myanmar
