= Vegan honey =

Vegan honey may refer to:

- Any syrup, produced from a plant source and used in replacement of honey
- Bee Free Honee, apple-based product discontinued in 2019
- Mellody, plant-based product by the American food technology company MeliBio
