= Melittology =

Scientific study of bees

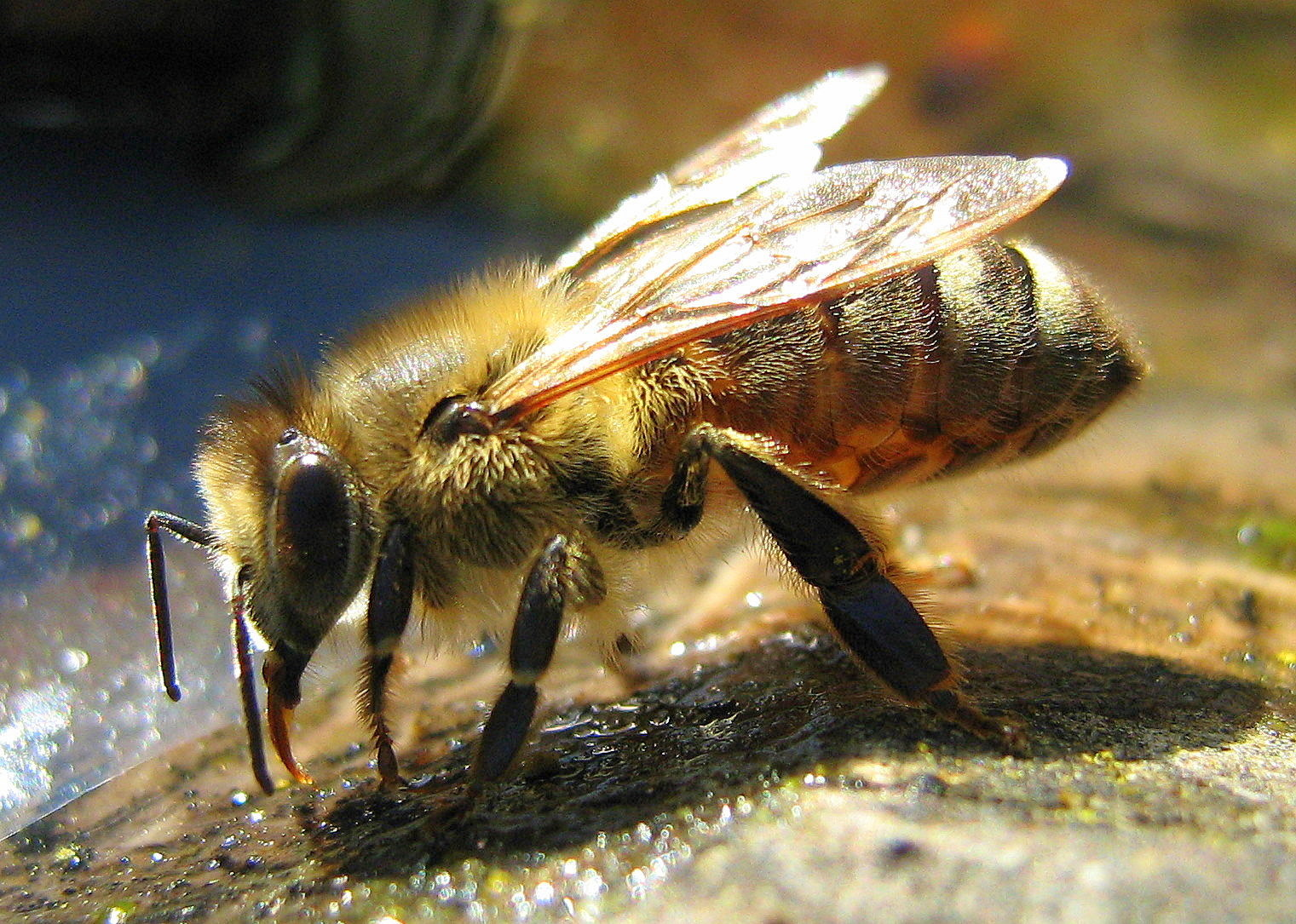
A honeybee drinking water

Melittology (from Greek μέλιττα, melitta, "bee"; and -λογία -logia) is a branch of entomology concerning the scientific study of bees. It can also be called apiology or apicology. Melittology covers the species found in the clade Anthophila within the superfamily Apoidea, comprising more than 20,000 species, including bumblebees and honey bees. Managed bees, like honeybees and some bumblebees, account for a small percentage of all bee species.

== Subdivisions ==
- Apiology – (from Latin apis, "bee"; and Ancient Greek -λογία, -logia) is the scientific study of honey bees. Honey bees are commonly an example for analysis of social systems.

- Apidology is a variant spelling of apiology used outside of the Western Hemisphere, primarily in Europe; it is sometimes used interchangeably with melittology.

== Melittological societies ==
Melittologists and apiologists are served by a number of scientific societies, both national and international in scope. Their main role is to encourage the study of bees and apicultural research.

- International Bee Research Association
- British Beekeepers Association
- German Beekeepers Association
- Federation of Irish Beekeepers' Associations

== Melittological journals ==
- Apidologie
- American Bee Journal
- Journal of Apicultural Research
- Journal of Melittology

== See also ==
- Beekeeping
- I Have a Bee, worldwide organization for hobby beekeepers
- Vespology
- Melissopalynology

=== Melittologists ===
- Eva Crane (12 June 1912 – 6 September 2007), founded the Bee Research Association which later became the International Bee Research Association.
- Thomas William Cowan (1840–1926), former cofounder and president of the British Beekeepers' Association. Designed the cylindrical honey extractor
- Jeffery Pettis, head of Apimondia
