= Beekeeping in Ireland =

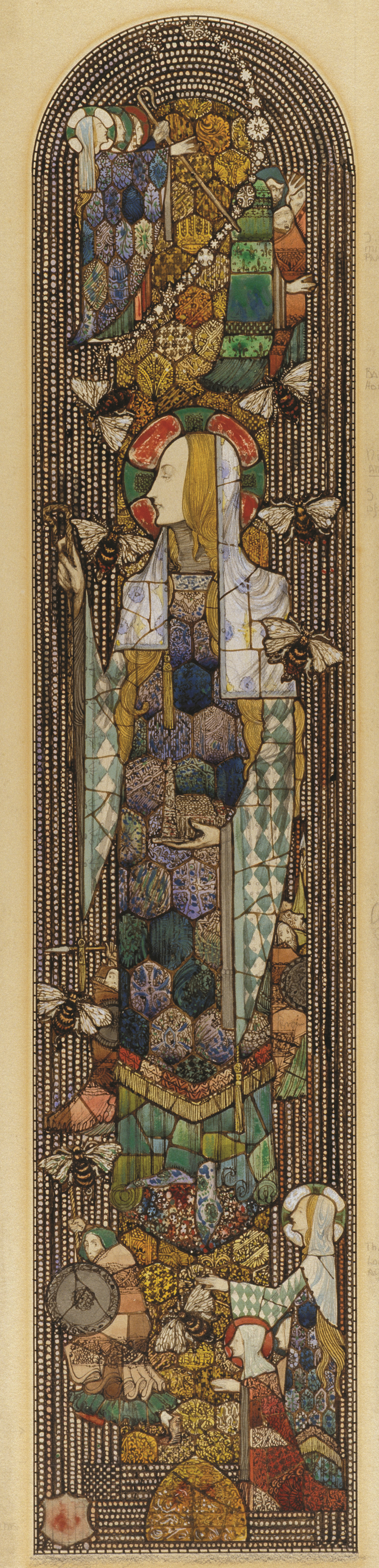
Harry Clarke's design drawing for the Saint Gobnait window in the Honan Chapel, Cork, Ireland (1914). Saint Gobnait of Ballyvourney is a sixth-century patron saint of beekeepers.

Beekeeping is first recorded in Ireland in the seventh century. It has seen a surge in popularity in modern times, with the membership of beekeeping associations exceeding 4,500. The median average number of hives per beekeeper is three hives, while the average honey output per hive is 11.4 kg (25 lb). The growth in the practice has occurred despite increased pressures on bees and beekeepers due to habitat loss, parasites and diseases, which has contributed to deaths approaching half of all honeybees in Ireland.

== History ==
Some beekeepers have suggested that honey bees could have flown across a post-glacial land bridge between Great Britain and Ireland. However the current academic consensus since 1983 is that this could not have occurred, because there was no land bridge between the two islands, based on evidence including computer models and marine geological research.

Further, there is no evidence of beeswax in Neolithic pottery vessels in Ireland, although such evidence is widespread across Europe as close as the lower reaches of the Thames. Neolithic cire perdue bronze castings from this period are very few in Ireland..

Also in the 3rd century AD, Solinus mentioned that Ireland (Hibernia) had no bees.

The earliest reference to bees in Ireland is in the Bechbretha (Old Irish for "Bee-judgements") of the Brehon Laws, composed after 637 AD. Among other issues, these dealt with the ownership and value of swarms, the compensation paid by the beekeeper to a person stung by one of his bees and the compensation paid to the beekeeper if a person's hens began eating his bees. The Bechbretha's bee judgements are unique in treating bee swarms as capable of trespass. This is related to their treatment of other livestock, but no other legal system applies the concept to bees, and it may be taken as evidence that the authors of the Bechbretha were trying to fit the new facts about bees into their longstanding legal ideas about livestock in general.

The Bechbretha gives Old Irish words, mil for honey and mid for mead; later versions from the ninth and tenth centuries contain the Old Irish word tarbsaithe meaning "cast swarm", an act performed only by honey bees. These are cognate with Indo-European forms across Europe and beyond, and they are very close to the same words in early Welsh. The Old Irish language includes the Latin loanword for beeswax céir, from the Latin ceris (only small amounts of wax can be obtained from the nests of bumble bees), suggesting the presence of honeybees near to the arrival of Christianity in 430 AD, and then for the word beehive lestar which may also be derived from a Welsh word, suggesting beekeeping was probably not established until the 5th or 6th centuries. This time frame matches with the legend of St. Modomnoc, whom it is claimed first brought bees to Ireland from Wales in the early 540s, just as the extreme weather events of 535–536 were subsiding. After the 7th century, Irish bronze founders became masters of the cire perdue technique.

A "great mortality of bees" was recorded in 950 AD, and again in 992 AD when it was said that "bees were largely kept in Ireland at this time, and were a great source of wealth to the people". In 1443 AD "the third epizooty (disease outbreak) of bees" was recorded.

The first beekeeping book in Ireland was written in 1733, Instructions for Managing Bees. It included recommendations for the use of skeps and stipulated the best size to use to encourage at least one swarm per year with two afterswarms. The bees would traditionally have been killed at the end of each season to be able to extract the honey and wax. By the mid-1700s, beekeepers started using boxes for keeping bees, and using different methods to extract the honey and wax without killing the bees.

In the 1870s, Brother Joseph, a Carmelite friar from Loughrea, imported a bar and frame hive from London and then began to produce his own versions. He is also recorded as being one of the first to import the Ligurian Italian honey bee (A. m. ligustica) with a view to selective breeding "..as being more prolific.. and harder workers.. would improve our home breed (the Irish strain of A. m. mellifera)". In 1881, the Reverend George Proctor was believed to be the first in the country to own Langstroth Hives (invented in 1852) with their moveable frames, upon which subsequent modern hives are based.

== Population history ==
No DNA research on honey bees in collections dating to before the Isle of Wight disease has been carried out. The honey bee population during that time is described as the "Old Irish Black Bee".

=== Isle of Wight Disease (IoWD) ===
Acarine, or as it was known at the time, Isle of Wight Disease (IoWD), was first reported on the Isle of Wight in 1906, where it wiped out 75% of the bee colonies in the first year. By 1912, the IoWD had arrived on the east coast of Ireland. It steadily spread throughout the island over the next decade. In 1919, bees were exported from County Tipperary to English beekeepers; however, these Irish bees also died. By 1923, "the country was swept clean of bees". By 1927 the Irish Beekeepers Association (IBA) requested the government to adopt a restocking scheme for re-population and for "importation of (resistant) Queen Bees for re-sale at reduced prices." Many of the local bee associations had already begun importing their stocks. The majority of the bees were Dutch A. m. mellifera, with their characteristic tendency to swarm.

In 1921, the cause of the IoWD was believed to have been identified as the Acarapis woodi a tracheal mite. Bees with larger tracheas appear to be more susceptible to Acarapis woodi mite infestation, and the A. m. mellifera is considered to be a larger bee with its attendant larger trachea than other European honey bees.

In 1945, Brother Adam, the breeder of the Buckfast bee, obtained "pure native" Old Irish Black Bee queens that had survived the Acarine epidemic "from a secluded place in the far west of Ireland," from which he raised virgin Queens and then crossed them with his Buckfast drones known to be resistant to Acarine, at his isolated Closed Mating Station on Dartmoor. However, like the British Black Bee, from which it descended, all died from Acarine. In 1983 Brother Adam wrote, "the old English (and by inference Irish) brown bee... lives today only in the memory... and was completely wiped out."

=== Possible survivors of the IoWD ===
Modern DNA analysis has shown that nearly 98% of the DNA of honey bees in Ireland are the Apis mellifera mellifera subspecies (European dark bee). They are mainly of Dutch origin, with smaller amounts of DNA originating from France, Switzerland and elsewhere in Europe. Analysis of the mitochondrial DNA showed that the bees tested were descended from imported European Queens. The bees contained over 97% purity of A. m. mellifera DNA, showing little introgression from other European subspecies. Bees kept by members of the Native Irish Honey Bee Society (NIHBS) have minimal genetic traces of the honey bees from before the IoWD.

Some NIHBS members now acknowledge, as a result of the imports after the IoWD, the presence of Dutch DNA in the bees in Ireland, but at the same time maintain that there are descendants of the indigenous Irish bees somewhere in Ireland. Some bees from the Beara peninsula have unusual genetic markers, and there has been speculation that this may represent a remnant of the pre-IoWD population.

Other groups suggest that whatever the genetic stock may represent, these attempts will result in inbreeding, to the long-term detriment of the population.

== Native honey bee status ==
=== Legal status ===
Both the Republic of Ireland and the U.K. (which Northern Ireland is part of) are parties to the Convention on Biological Diversity, and as such officially have adopted the international definitions of an "Alien (Non-Native) Species... (as) a subspecies... introduced... outside its natural or present distribution... by human agency", and also an "Invasive Alien (Non-Native) Species... whose introduction... threaten biological diversity". These definitions have also been adopted by EU Regulation which has been incorporated into the Republic of Ireland's and the U.K. (Northern Ireland) legislation (still retained after the UK's departure from the EU).

Making the Apis mellifera (the honey bee) an introduced / Non-Native species, but not an Invasive Species, as it does not threaten bio-diversity. Within Northern Ireland there is the acceptance that some Non-Native animals, such as Honey Bees, are "important to the economy", while within the Republic of Ireland, the Department of Agriculture, Food and the Marine's website refers to the honey bee, and in particular the sub-species A. m. mellifera as the "Native Irish Honey Bee", contradicting the EU's and the Republic of Ireland's definitions of native/alien species in their own legislation.

=== DNA status ===
In 2017 DNA research was performed on beehives throughout Ireland, finding that the honey bees (except those on Beara peninsula) had been imported (primarily from The Netherlands) around 1923 due to the IoWD eradicating the indigenous honey bee population.

== Honeybee pests and diseases ==
=== Varroa ===
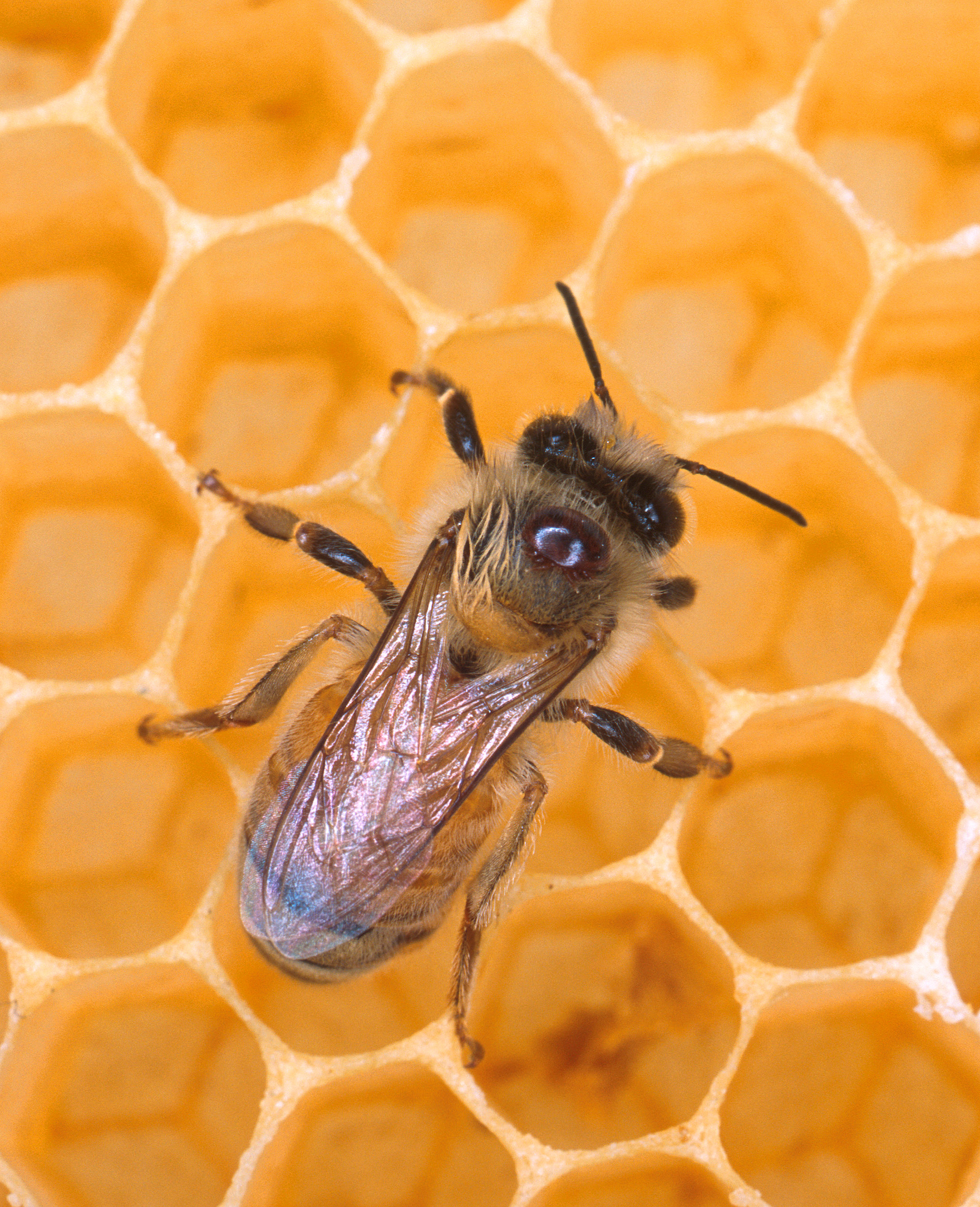
Apis mellifera with a Varroa destructor mite on its thorax

Presently, the Varroa destructor mite is the single greatest threat to bee colonies in Ireland. In the 1990s, colonies would die within three to four years if left untreated. By the 2000s, this had become closer to two years. Typically after the initial infestation, there can be a rapid increase in the mite population which would lead to colony collapse. Varroa mites arrived in the Republic of Ireland in 1998, in Northern Ireland in 2002 and within a few years had spread throughout most of the island. The mortality rate for over-wintered colonies during 2015–16 in the Republic of Ireland was 29.5% and for Northern Ireland was 28.2%; for comparison Wales was 22.4% and Scotland was 18%, while the European average was 12%. As a result of Varroa, wild colonies do not survive for long; feral colonies, swarms that have escaped from apiaries, will die quickly. However, their homes can be re-occupied afterward by new swarms for the cycle to repeat. These feral colonies can become a source of large Varroa populations. The fact that Varroa has shown resistance to previously effective treatments can result in regional losses as high as 40–60%.

Widely-spread feral colonies in tree hives in a forest environment have been found to be able to survive with Varroa on a long-term basis, however these bees are not A. m. mellifera as is common in Ireland and these colonies do not suppress Varroa reproduction and the reason for their survival is unclear. In another case of surviving untreated colonies, the Varroa acts as a host to a non-lethal Deformed Wing Virus (DWV).

Conventional advice is to continually manage the Varroa mite population, a counter approach would be to breed bees that allegedly remove and kill Varroa mites in the hope that such colonies will not need treatment against the Varroa mite and in turn may survive in the wild. GBBG, NIHBS and FIBKA have breeding programs to do this "by observing the number of damaged mites", without DNA analysis nor the use of instrumental insemination.

Marks on the mite's exoskeletons were used as a proxy measure to estimate the bees degree of varroa resistance, as the marks were attributed to damage caused by the bees grooming / biting behavior, but this theory is likely inaccurate; these marks are more likely to be mere "regular dorsal dimples (indentations)". To date no useful degree of resistance to Varroa has been found in A. m. mellifera in Ireland or elsewhere. However breeders of Buckfast bees are selling queens which they advertise as resistant to Varroa and A. m. carnica breeders have been successfully breeding Varroa resistant bees for some years.

In 2013, a Varroa Tolerance Breeding Program was set up by NIHBS. Focusing solely on what they describe as "Native Irish" bees (A. m. mellifera), in conjunction with several breeding groups throughout Ireland, including the Galtee Bee Breeding Group whose apiary manager, Micheál Mac Giolla Coda from County Tipperary, is a former President of BIBBA. Bees kept by NIHBS members were not able to resist the Varroa mites without treatments.

In 2017, research was conducted focusing on A. m. mellifera from the NIHBS breeders, and searching for the Hygienic Behaviour characteristic (which can result in disease and mite resistance), no Hygienic Behaviour was reported; the full results were not published. Earlier research had found that the A. m. mellifera subspecies had the lowest Hygienic Behaviour across Europe: The A. m. mellifera from Native Bee (A. m. mellifera) Conservation Areas (the least genetically diverse) had the worst results.

=== Foulbroods ===
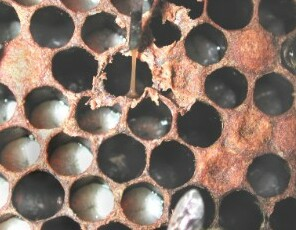
Insert a probe to swab the cell, if there is a sticky or "ropey" portion attached to the probe that creates a "string" between the cell and the probe, the hive is likely infected with American foulbrood

American foulbrood (AFB) is caused by the spore-forming bacterium Paenibacillus larvae, and the European foulbrood (EFB) is caused by the non-spore forming bacterium, Melissococcus plutonius. Both are referred to as Foul Brood and have been known in Ireland since at least 1897. In the Irish Bee Journal of 1901, "the rapid spread of foul brood, that most terrible pest" was discussed. They are both extraordinarily infectious and persistent diseases affecting only the brood, and spores of AFB can survive for up to 40 years. The adoption of modern beekeeping aided in spreading both these diseases, with the use of moveable frames, non-destruction of colonies each year, and beekeeping equipment moving between apiaries. They are the two brood diseases that are notifiable in both jurisdictions of Ireland. In 1903, the Bee Pest Act was enacted in all of Ireland, and in 1945 The Bee Pest Prevention Act was enacted in Northern Ireland (which repealed the previous 1908 Act.) UKBA and government officials worked closely to bring this about, initially the 1945 Act also included Acarine and Nosema as notifiable diseases reflecting their devastating effects on bee populations at the time. Bee Inspectors have been appointed to regularly inspect beehives and testing facilities have been established for beekeepers to have the contents of their hives diagnosed for disease. These services are provided free of charge. In 1945 in Northern Ireland, 14% of hives inspected (including unoccupied) were found to contain AFB, however, by 1949, this had been reduced to 2.8%. In 1950, 11.9% of unoccupied hives inspected contained AFB spores.

Oxytetracycline tetracycline, an antibiotic, can be used for treatment against EFB, but it is dependent on the Bee Inspector. It can also be used as a treatment against AFB, but it and all other treatments for AFB are now illegal. The only course of action that can be taken, once AFB confirms with a Bee Inspector that the hive is contaminated, is for the hive to be sealed at night and then the hive and bees have to be burned. In both cases, a ban on moving anything from the apiary during the outbreak will be imposed.

== Other bee diseases, pests and threats ==
The other usual diseases of the honey bee are present in Ireland, although currently it is believed that Ireland is free from the Small Hive Beetle (Aethina tumida Murray) and Tropilaelaps mercedesae. To date the phenomenon of Colony collapse disorder (CCD) has not been reported in Ireland.

=== Asian Hornet ===
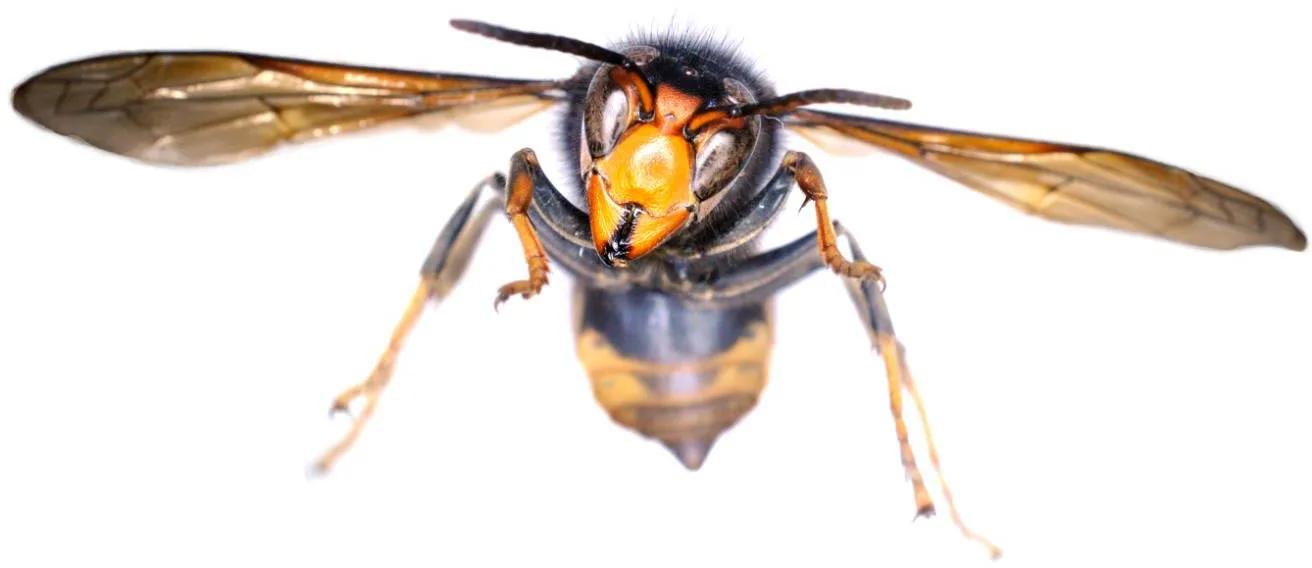
The Asian Hornet (Vespa velutina) specimen recovered in Dublin, 2021.

Although Ireland, unlike Britain, does not have European hornets (Vespa crabro), it has been observed that the Asian hornet (Vespa velutina) exhibits considerable geographic adaptability, with regular sightings in Britain since 2016. The Vespa velutina will readily predate on Apis mellifera hives, which are unable to defend themselves against their attacks, resulting in significant deaths, and potential collapse of the colonies.

In 2021, an "alive but dying" Asian hornet (Vespa velutina), was found in Dublin. There was no evidence of a nest in the area and the hornets' point of entry was believed to be via a nearby international transportation hub. To date Ireland appears to still be free from any hornets (insects in the genus Vespa). DNA analysis later concluded that the Vespa velutina was an accidental import from Britain or Europe and not from an established Irish nest. The research also confirmed that all Vespa velutina within Europe presently are descended from one mated queen imported from China into France 2004, showing the possibility of Asian hornets becoming established in Ireland from only one queen, although it is doubtful that the Irish weather would enable a viable population to develop, but continued climate change will likely facilitate this.

In August 2025, multiple Asian hornets (Vespa velutina), were found in Cork city, following almost two weeks of intensive searching their nest was located by the Asian Hornet Management Group, chaired by the National Parks and Wildlife Service. It was stated that the nest would be removed and taken to the National Museum of Ireland, with DNA testing conducted on the hornets to determine their origin. No information was provided on whether the nest was producing Queens or if it was the only nest in County Cork.

=== Pesticide poisoning and forage destruction ===
Of the agricultural chemicals used, it is the fungicides and the insecticides that can affect bees the most. Fungicides may pass into pollen and then transfer into the bee bread. Some fungicides are synergistic with some acaricides and are used to combat Varroa, magnifying their effect on the bees themselves. From agriculture, there is widespread use of pesticides which may cause serious harm to insects including bees, along with widespread destruction of habitat which is essential for bee foraging.

== Formation of beekeeping associations ==
In 1880, the British Beekeepers Association (BBKA) decided to tour Ireland with a "bee tent" to show modern beekeeping equipment and manipulations of bees to the public. They were joined by Brother Joseph, throughout much of Ireland as he continued on his "holy crusade" for the honey bee; he later proposed the formation of an Irish beekeeping association "for promoting and instructing the improved methods of bee culture to the cottagers of Ireland". In 1881 the Irish Beekeepers Associations (IBKA) was formed, holding a honey show in Dublin; in 1908 their name was changed to Irish Beekeepers' Association (IBA), in 1939 it was closed down due to decreasing membership.

In 1943, the County Dublin Beekeepers' Association was formed, from which an attempt was made to revive the old IBA to form an all-Ireland body. On St. Patrick's Day in 1944, the Federation of Irish Beekeepers' Associations was formed; the recently formed Ulster Bee Keepers' Association (UBKA) did not associate themselves with it.

In 1926, the Banbridge and District Beekeeping Association was formed; in 1934, its name became the Northern Ireland Bee Keepers' Association. In 1942 the UBKA was formed and in 1951 the smaller NIBKA affiliated with it and was later absorbed into it. In 1949 there were 6,000 beekeepers with 16,000 hives, the most common of which was the CDB Hive. At the 14th Annual Conference in 1959 a lecture was given entitled "How to take advantage of the Buckfast strain of bees, to be shortly introduced into Northern Ireland". At the 15th Annual Conference in 1960 a member of the Ministry of Agriculture gave the lecture "The Buckfast Strain of Honeybee and its dissemination throughout Northern Ireland". In 1966 at the 21st Annual Conference of the UBKA it was decided that all subsequent Conferences should be held at Greenmount Agricultural and Horticultural College; it was also at this conference that the Ministry of Agriculture informed the UBKA "that due to the increase of Nosema, the Buckfast Queen distribution scheme was being suspended", a scheme initially begun to improve the local bee stock (the A. m. mellifera imported after the IoWD).

In 1966, the FIBKA raised the subject of forming an All-Ireland Beekeepers' Alliance but the UBKA unanimously rejected the suggestion, opting instead to support continued co-operation. In 2018 the FIBKA again raised to prospect of a form of integration with the smaller UBKA. The UBKA has since begun to develop their own education course independent of the FIBKA.

In 2017 the FIBKA split resulting in the creation of the Irish Beekeepers' Association CLG (IBA), an all-Ireland body to represent all beekeepers, irrespective of the type of bee they keep, and to also provide group insurance for the beekeeping Associations, as well as to individual beekeepers who are not members of Associations.

== Current active organisations ==
The main beekeeping organisations in the Republic of Ireland are the Federation of Irish Beekeepers' Associations CLG (FIBKA) and the Irish Beekeepers Association/Cumann Beachairí na hÉireann (CLG), while in Northern Ireland the main beekeeping organisations are the Ulster Beekeepers Association (UBKA) and the Institute of Northern Ireland Beekeepers (INIB). There are also a number of other organisations on the island of Ireland, such as the Native Irish Honey Bee Society (NIHBS), including numerous groups centered online via social media, such as the Irish Buckfast & Carniolan Beekeepers (IBCB).

=== Federation of Irish Beekeepers' Associations CLG (FIBKA) ===
FIBKA is an organisation of beekeeping associations in the Republic of Ireland, claiming to have been established in 1881, and reconstituted 1943. FIBKA is a not-for-profit federation of beekeeping associations in Ireland with currently over 40 affiliated associations which between them have over 3,000 members.

FIBKA has run a summer course in beekeeping every year since 1961, until interrupted in 2020 by the COVID-19 pandemic. This had been held at Gormanston, Co. Meath in Gormanston College but starting in 2022 will be held in Maynooth University in a shortened 2-day event. Up to this, examinations were held in the full range of beekeeping education, from the preliminary exams up to Honey Judge. FIBKA is a signatory, contributor to, and supporter of the All-Ireland Pollinator Plan, and is a member of the European Professional Beekeepers Association, the Council of National Beekeeping Associations (CONBRA) in the United Kingdom and Ireland, working with other organizations such as The UK National Honey Show, BeeLife (European Beekeeping Conservation), European Professional Beekeepers Association (EPBA) and Apimondia.

FIBKA's stated goals also include the promotion and conservation of the A. m. mellifera which they call "the native dark bee" as stated in their Constitution.

==== FIBKA split of 2017 ====
In 2017 an acrimonious split occurred within the FIBKA ostensibly over the issue of increasing the yearly fees and management, eventually over a third of the Associations would leave FIBKA and join the alternative IBA. Following the split the FIBKA published letters to be circulated amongst their member Associations, stating that although the IBA permitted dual membership, an Association affiliated with the FIBKA "must affiliate all their members" with the FIBKA, and "not accept" individual beekeepers not affiliated with the FIBKA (meaning members of the IBA). Also it was stated that beekeepers which were members of a local Association not affiliated with the FIBKA would not be permitted to attend the Maynooth (formally Gormanston five days) two day Summer Course, partake of the FIBKA's Honey Shows, Education or Exams including lectures, etc., which would result in not only IBA members but also beekeepers from outside the Republic of Ireland (such as the UBKA or those from overseas) not being permitted to attend any of the FIBKA funded / organized events: The IBA in contrast offers "knowledge and information, as freely as possible; be it in our newsletters, events or webinars to members and non members alike". Allegations of "defamatory statements" and of attempts to "poach members", were made during this split, however the FIBKA, while excluding non-FIBKA beekeepers from previously well attended international beekeeping events within Ireland, simultaneously expressed a hope of reconciliation and the intentions of reaching out to all beekeeping organizations on the island (including UBKA) to form one organization, in particlular to NIHBS to become an integrated part of the FIBKA.

The FIBKA publishes a monthly newsletter called An Beachaire covering many subjects related to beekeeping, which is made available online to members only.

=== Irish Beekeepers' Association CLG (IBA) ===
The IBA is an organisation of beekeeping associations in the island of Ireland, acting as an "alternative organisation (to FIBKA)", striving to be "a democratic and egalitarian company, founded in October 2017", with at present 23 association members. Its stated goals are "to be Open, Fair and Transparent in all Our Actions for Our Members and to promote Beekeeping for all Beekeepers" ... "throughout the island of Ireland". The members "hope to create an environment of mutual respect and understanding, so that no beekeeper ever feels marginalised or ostracised because of the type of bee they keep". It offers membership insurance for both the North and South of Ireland, also offering individual membership not just association membership. It provides facilities and benefits comparable to those available from the FIBKA, even though it is about half the size. They support and endorse the All-Ireland Pollinator plan as well as the National Heritage Plan.

The IBA regularly publishes Newsletters covering many subjects related to beekeeping, which it makes freely available online to all, including non-members.

=== Native Irish Honey Bee Society (NIHBS) ===
In 1991, the Galtee Bee Breeding Group (GBBG) was formed as an Irish breeding group within BIBBA (Bee Improvement & Bee Breeders Association - a British Isles organization promoting what they called the British "Native Bee", the subspecies A. m. mellifera) by Micheál Mac Giolla Coda and other beekeepers in the area of the Galtee Vee Valley in south County Tipperary in an attempt to improve the temperament of their bees, the A. m. mellifera subspecies, having been imported by the Mac Giolla Coda's from the Netherlands in the 1920s after the Isle of Wight Disease had swept through Ireland. By 1996 their numbers had increased to seventy after BIBBA held their Conference in the area, Mac Giolla Coda would later go on to become President of BIBBA. Initially using the name "native British Isles bee" the GBBG later began to refer to their bees as the native (Note: Within Northern Ireland (part of the UK) the internationally recognised scientific definition of Non-Native fauna is used, meaning an animal (in this case A. mellifera) that is imported by humans, so the honey bee is not native to Northern Ireland: But in the Republic of Ireland, a unique definition of the word native is used, it means an animal which was established in Ireland by 1500 A.D. (even if it was imported into Ireland by humans), resulting in the honey bee being defined as a native within the Republic of Ireland. However, since 2021, Irish Government's websites have been quoting and containing web links to internationally recognised definitions of native and non-native, which would result in the honey bee no longer being defined as native to Ireland.) bee, later other beekeeping groups began to form throughout Ireland following GBBG's example of promoting A. m. mellifera as the Native Irish Bee, and in 2012, the Native Irish Honey Bee Society was formed and tasked with continuing the work on an island wide basis, at which point the newsletter of the GBBG was taken over by the NIHBS. The NIHBS's stated mission is "the conservation of the native Irish Honey Bee Apis mellifera mellifera", the NIHBS refutes that honey bees cannot be native to Ireland due to a lack of a land bridge with Britain, confirmed by marine geological evidence, with a senior member of the NIHBS stating "nobody was there at the time".

The NIHBS also maintains that "The native Irish honey bee is part of the subspecies that evolved in northwestern Europe", while the A. m. mellifera actually evolved in central Asia and migrated into northern Europe after the last ice age, they also claim that "research...confirmed unambiguously in 2018 that it is genetically distinctive", for a bee to be a distinct part of a subspecies, an ecotype or haplotype would need to have been identified, to date the only identifiable genetic characteristic that has been observed is the Dutch haplotype from which the NIHBS bees are descended. The NIHBS further goes on to claim that this alleged genetic "distinctiveness contributes the traits that make it the bee most adapted to Ireland's climate and weather patterns", no research has been published to support these "most adapted" claims, nor an Irish ecotype identified.

The primary threat that the NIHBS claims their bees face is "hybridization with bees from a different genetic stock", however research published from Tasmania in 1995, from Poland in 2013 and later research conducted in Ireland in 2017, all showed that the A. m. mellifera Queens do not mate with Drones of a different subspecies (genetic stock), and were able to remain non-hybridized even when surrounded by bees of a different subspecies. However the NIHBS still aims to establish areas of conservation throughout the island for the conservation of "native" bees.

A major secondary concern expressed by the NIHBS is of "diseases that might be imported with bees from broad", while still supporting the importation of their own subspecies from abroad.

Some members of the NIHBS still claim that their "Native Irish Honey Bee is a strain of the Dark European Honey Bee (A. m. mellifera)", meaning a genetic variant, some even stating that their own bees are unique ecotypes, such claims are contradicted by the recent research.

==== Protection of the Native Irish Honey Bee Bill ====
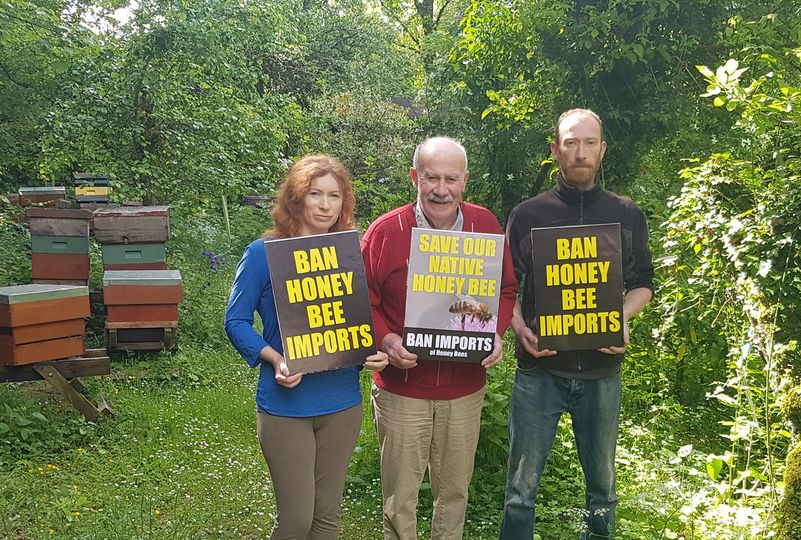
Beekeepers from the Galtee Vee Valley area holding the NIBHS posters to support the Bill before the Seanad: Aoife Nic Giolla Coda the Chairperson of the NIHBS (left), her father Michael Mac Giolla Coda, founding member of GBBG (centre), his son Séadna Mac Giolla Coda (right).

In October 2021, Senator Vincent P. Martin, a member of the Green Party, under the advice and guidance of the NIHBS, submitted a Bill to the Seanad Éireann (Irish Senate) with the stated aim of banning imports into the Republic of Ireland "of non-native honey bees". However the Bill would permit the importation of honey bees from outside the Republic of Ireland (i.e. Northern Ireland, Britain, or Europe) as long as they were the A. m. mellifera subspecies which the Bill calls "Native Irish", even if they do not originate from Ireland, therefore the Bill would define the A. m. mellifera from France to Russia as "Native Irish".

The Bill does not define how the A. m. mellifera will be identified. Nevertheless, a person who is convicted of contravening this Bill (if it becomes law) could potentially face a fine of up to €250,000 and a sentence of up to 2 years in prison. The Bill would include couriers delivering honey bees, and non-beekeepers with honey bees on their property, requiring all persons possessing honey bees to provide non-defined documentation. The Bill grants the authority to enter and search property and vehicles without a search warrant.

In June 2022, the Bill passed its Second stage in the Seanad Éireann, with unanimous cross party support, however, some members expressed doubts on whether the Bill would be compatible with EU Law. Some of the Members declared that they are NIHBS members, most of them had attended a presentation which was given by the NIHBS prior to the session. At this same time Sinn Féin endorsed the goals of the NIHBS.

In November 2022, the Bill passed to its Third reading, the argument for the Bill was reiterated, "with the aim of reducing the threat to.. biodiversity and the ecosystem arising from the introgression of the.. Apis mellifera mellifera, due to the importation of non-native species or sub-species..", in response "the advice from the Attorney General (was) that the legal and / or scientific basis to impose a full (importation) ban on all other species of (honey) bee has not at this point been established with the required certainty", the Minister, reading from a pre-prepared statement went on to say that "scientific assessment is required to substantiate the specific measure proposed in the Bill" and cited the lack of "independent scientific evidence", therefore rejecting the claims made by the NIHBS.

On 1 March 2023 the Department requested tenders to be submitted for the provision of this "independent scientific evidence", giving one month to do so, with the expectation of a report within three months. Only previously published research after 1993 was permitted to be used. Tenderers needed to show clearly that they could deal with the precise requests of the Department, not merely providing an "affirmative statement", citing "peer reviewed journals and ...international scientific research". There were a total of twelve extensive research requests the Tenderer had to provide, with the twelfth requesting details of "measures that could achieve the same objectives as those set out in the Bill", which if provided (a requirement for the Tender to be issued) would result in the Bill being unnecessary. Tenderers are required to be companies with at least two years experience in providing similar services and provide two examples of such work, there is no entity with the Republic of Ireland that is known to be able to meet these criteria. At present it is unclear if any tenders were submitted, without which the Bill cannot proceed to Law.

=== Irish Buckfast & Carniolan Beekeepers (IBCB) ===
The IBCB is a group of beekeepers interested in promoting honey bees of the Buckfast bee breed and A. m. carnica (common name Carniolan) subspecies throughout Ireland. Containing experienced members to complete beginners, they state that they are "not really interested in A. m. mellifera bees," the so-called "native Irish bee," but that they are not "bee racists", having amongst their membership beekeepers that only keep A. m. mellifera bees.

=== Ulster Beekeepers Association (UBKA) ===
The UBKA was formed in 1942 and is an association of the fourteen affiliated beekeeping associations in Northern Ireland. The UBKA in conjunction with CAFRE, runs an Open College Network Northern Ireland (OCN NI) endorsed beekeeping course and intends to develop higher level studies in the near future, this education is now independent from FIBKA. The UBKA is a member of CONBRA and maintains links with the EPBA and Apimondia. It also collaborates with all beekeeping associations within Ireland and the rest of the UK. The UBKA holds an Annual Conference at the CAFRE Greenmount Campus site in Antrim, as well as Annual Honey Shows, Bee Health Workshops and an International Young Beekeeper competition. It is a registered charity (number – GB-NI-100709) with six trustees who are elected officers, reporting to an executive which is made up of representatives from the local associations.

=== Institute of Northern Ireland Beekeepers (INIB) ===
The INIB was formed in 2001. Members automatically become members of the BBKA, which entitles members to individual insurance. The INIB holds an Annual Conference and Honey Show. Its primary focus is on the promotion of beekeeping through education and they work closely with the UBKA.

== Research ==
Within Ireland, the research into honey bees has focused on identifying the type of bee (sub-species) present, not on their characteristics, unlike in the rest of Europe. Over recent years this research has shifted towards genetic analysis, primarily driven by the NIHBS and formally the GBBG. Before 2000, genetic diversity throughout the island appeared high; however, by 2005, reduced genetic diversity was observed around the Galtee Vee Valley area due to the breeding program of the GBBG. By 2017 this decline had also been observed in County Louth and Connemara. It was again concluded by the authors of the research that the NIHBS breeding groups in these areas had caused the reduction of genetic diversity in their attempts to breed their genetically pure "native Irish honeybee."

In 2021, the NIHBS began publishing articles on its website refuting the scientific research findings that had identified the NIHBS as the source of the decline in genetic diversity. An article by Michael Mac Giolla Coda stated, "the gene pool has been greatly reduced by the decimation of all the wild colonies (due to Varroa destructor)" another claim was "We never had a problem with queen failure until the arrival of Varroa," another article published by Jonathan Getty stated "The gene pool has been drastically reduced by the Varroa mite" another claim was that the NIHBS bees "have developed resistance to many bee diseases" due to "the Irish climate." No sources were cited to support these claims.

- In the 1960s, wing morphometric analysis was conducted on bees collected throughout Ireland, finding that they had a high genetic diversity. The majority of their DNA came from A. m. mellifera. In the 2000s the research was repeated by the Galtee Bee Breeding Group (GBBG). While the percentage of A. m. mellifera DNA had increased on average throughout the island, the genetic diversity had decreased. Over a third of the samples came from County Tipperary, where the GBBG is based.
- The survey entitled Varying Degrees of Apis mellifera ligustica Introgression in Protected Populations of the Black Honeybee, Apis mellifera mellifera, in Northwest Europe in 2005 received samples from the Galtee Bee Breeding Group (GBBG), taken from eight adjacent counties, which contained insignificant genetic diversity, the lowest recorded across Northern Europe, and therefore was treated as one sample. They were found to be pure A. m. mellifera descended from Queens imported from the Netherlands or Britain. Researchers concluded the low genetic diversity to be a result of the dominance of the GBBG.
- Starting in 2015 the Wild* Honey Bee Study (*feral, free-living or unmanaged), was initiated by the National University of Ireland Galway (NUIG) in collaboration with the NIHBS and the FIBKA, "to discover the number and distribution of their colonies in order to devise strategies for its conservation". Over 200 feral colonies were reported. The results of the study was published in 2021.
- For the 2017 Sustainable Management of Resilient Bee Populations research, samples of A. m. mellifera from Ireland were provided, they were analyzed for their inbreeding coefficients and compared to other bees throughout Europe. The A. m. mellifera from Ireland were found to significantly have the broadest range of inbreeding coefficients, potentially resulting in inbreeding. The research concluded that the high overwintering deaths, in part attributable to Varroa destructor mites, had not reduced genetic diversity in Europe, no explanation was given for Ireland's unique results, but it was not attributed to Varroa.
- A Significant Pure Population of the Dark European Honey Bee (Apis mellifera mellifera) Remains in Ireland: In 2018 genetic analysis was published on 412 bee samples from 81 sites (6% from Northern Ireland), all but the Beara bees were found to contain Mitochondria DNA (inherited through the female Queen line) observable in European A. m. mellifera, meaning that they were descended from imported continental bees from 1923 on wards. Of the identified haplotypes (meaning geographic regions from mainland Europe in this context) two thirds were descended from the Netherlands, "...amongst the beekeepers in the NIHBS, these (Dutch bees) are the predominant type of A. m. mellifera, here (in Ireland) reflecting the significant imports by beekeepers from the Netherlands after the loss of managed colonies during Isle of Wight disease", other countries identified as origins of the bees sampled were from France and Switzerland.

The research stated "97.8% of sampled bees were determined to be pure" and "genetically diverse" A. m. mellifera from an island wide perspective; however this diversity was not the case at the local level where "significantly lower (genetic diversity) than expected" was observed, due to "the elements of controlled breeding... of breeders" - the paper named the Galtee, Connemara and Louth "local breeding groups focused on A. m. mellifera" as the cause of this lack of genetic diversity.
The research paper stated, "It has been suggested that A. m. mellifera was entirely eliminated from Britain and Ireland at the time of the Isle of Wight disease (Adam, 1983)" what Br. Adams stated was "the old English (and by inference Irish) brown bee... lives today only in the memory.. and was completely wiped out (by the Isle of Wight disease)," clearly not referring to the imported European A. m. mellifera subspecies, but a British strain (ecotype) of the subspecies.

- In an investigation of free-living honey bee colonies in Ireland published in 2021, sites of seventy-six colonies of honey bees were identified throughout the Republic of Ireland. Samples for genetic analysis were taken, and their survival was recorded. They were all found to be A. m. mellifera, "fundamentally undifferentiated from the managed" population, with 40% belonging to the Dutch haplotype promoted by the NIHBS. Over 76% of them died within less than 2.5 years, they all died within four years, and they had an average annual death rate of 55%. The paper concluded with Ireland "having been the welcome recipient of Dutch honey bees following the collapse of Irish beekeeping at the beginning of the 20th century, Ireland may yet be able to return the favour by returning bees of Dutch haplotypes home to the Netherlands from a free-living population".
- The Beara Bee Case Study was presented in 2021 by Dr. Hassett, detailing a distinct A. m. mellifera lineage discovered in 2017 on the Beara Peninsula. Their DNA was unique compared to the other A. m. mellifera in Ireland, which had previously been identified as descending from continental imports since 1923. They are also unique to known northern European A. m. mellifera lineages. This has caused speculation that this may be a "unique mutation" or "an ancient historic Apis mellifera mellifera," possibly a remnant of the Old Irish Black Bee thought to have been wiped out by the Isle of Wight Disease in the early 1900s. It was referred to as the "Native Native (Irish) Bee" to differentiate it from the "Continental (Dutch) Native Bee" in Ireland, promoted by the NIHBS.

== Publications ==
- Irish Bee Journal (IBJ) was published by the Rev J.G. Digges from 1901 to 1933, and was succeeded by An Beachaire. FIBKA archives include bound volumes of the IBJ and these are available to researchers.
- An Beachaire, subtitled The Irish Beekeeper, was first published as a successor to the Irish Bee Journal in 1947, and is now published monthly by the FIBKA. The Irish word for "bee" is "beach", with "an beachaire" meaning "the beekeeper": Available to members only.
- The Irish Beekeepers' Association CLG (IBA) publishes regular newsletters freely available to all.
- Bee Craft Magazine is offered by the IBA to members at a 10% reduced price. Although this is a UK publication, much of its content is applicable to Ireland.
- The Four Seasons (Ceithre Raithe na Bliana) magazine is published four times per year by the NIHBS, formally it was the voice of the GBBG.
- Digital versions of back issues of BBKA News, subtitled The Newsletter of the British Beekeepers' Association, are provided to members of the FIBKA.

== See also ==
- Apimondia – International Federation of Beekeepers' Associations
- Beekeeper
- Irish Bee Conservation Project
