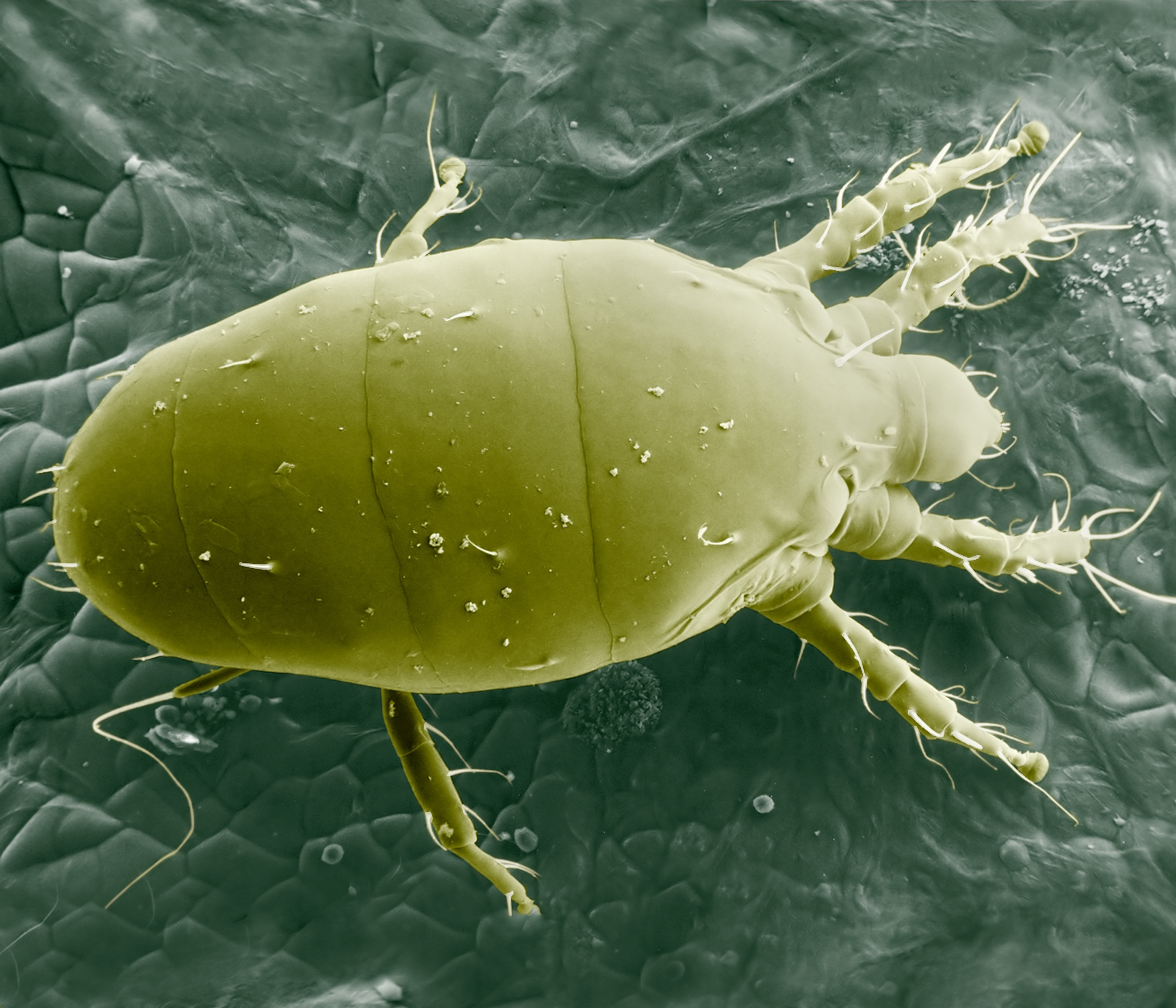

Scientific classification
- Kingdom: Animalia
- Phylum: Arthropoda
- Subphylum: Chelicerata
- Class: Arachnida
- Order: Trombidiformes
- Family: Tarsonemidae
- Genus: Polyphagotarsonemus
- Species: P. latus

Binomial name
- Polyphagotarsonemus latus (Banks, 1904)

Synonyms
- Tarsonemus latus Banks, 1904

= Polyphagotarsonemus latus =

Broad mite

Species of mite

The broad mite, Polyphagotarsonemus latus (Acari: Tarsonemidae), is a microscopic species of mite found on many species of plants, spanning 60 families including important agricultural species such as cotton, soybean, blackberries, strawberries, peppers, and other fruits. Broad mites are also currently affecting cannabis plants, as the industry matures with legalization. The mites are found in many areas worldwide and are major greenhouse pests.

P. latus infestation can typically cause stunting and twisting of the leaves and flowers, blackening, and death of new growth. The damage resembles that caused by auxin herbicides, which are thought to be a result of toxins produced in their salivary glands. The developmental threshold of P. latus is between 10 and 36 °C at 86% relative humidity. They can be controlled by removing and destroying infested plants and spraying with an acaricide. Alternatively, broad mite infestations can be controlled by introducing predatory mites, such as Amblyseius herbicolus, Neoseiulus barkeri, or Neoseiulus californicus.
