= Narcissus 'Rip van Winkle' =

Narcissus Cultivar 'Rip van Winkle' Daffodil

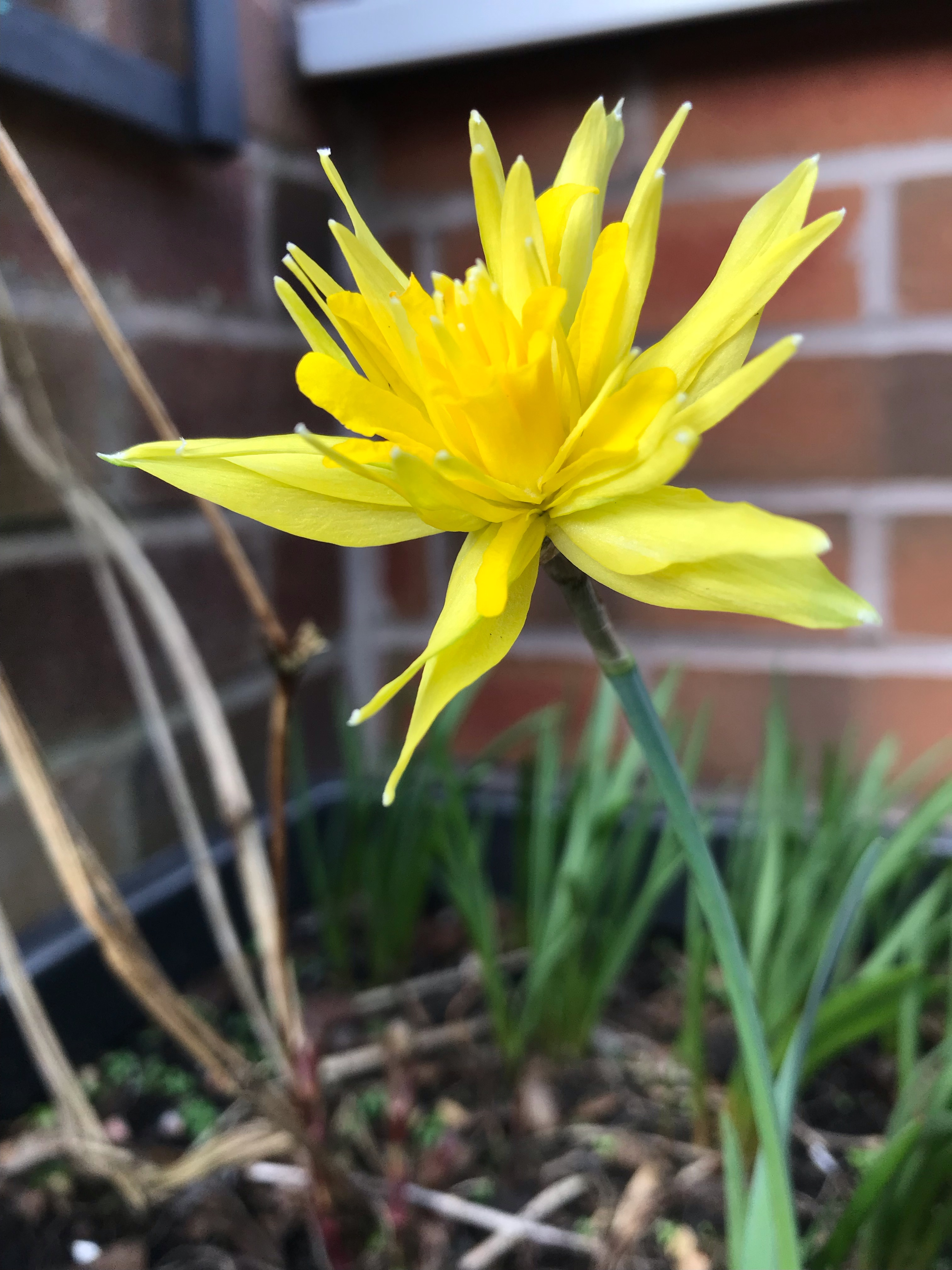
- Genus: Narcissus
- Species: Unknown
- Cultivar group: Division Four
- Cultivar: 'Rip van Winkle'
- Breeder: Unknown
- Origin: Ireland

Narcissus 'Rip van Winkle' is an heirloom cultivar of Narcissus, which was first introduced commercially in 1884. When the cultivar was produced is unknown, however it is believed this historic cultivar originated in Irish gardens. The cultivar was first distributed by plantsman William Baylor Hartland of Country Cork, Ireland.

It is also known under the synonym Narcissus minor var. pumilus 'Plenus'.

== Description ==
Narcissus 'Rip van Winkle' is an early flowering, dwarf variety of daffodil. Plants emerge in the spring from bulbs sprouting green leaves that grow to a height of 15 cm tall. Mature 'Rip van Winkle' possesses stems which host a double, golden-yellow flower. Flowers are 50 mm wide and consist of densely arranged and narrow petals, which also possess small patches of green pigment.

== Pests and diseases ==
Narcissus 'Rip van Winkle' may fall victim to pests such as narcissus eelworm (Ditylenchus dipsaci), bulb scale mites (Steneotarsonemus laticeps) and the large narcissus bulb fly (Merodon equestris). It may also be attacked by various species of slugs and snails. Like many Narcissus species, 'Rip van Winkle' is susceptible to narcissus basal rot, which is caused by the fungus species Fusarium oxysporum f.sp. narcissi.
