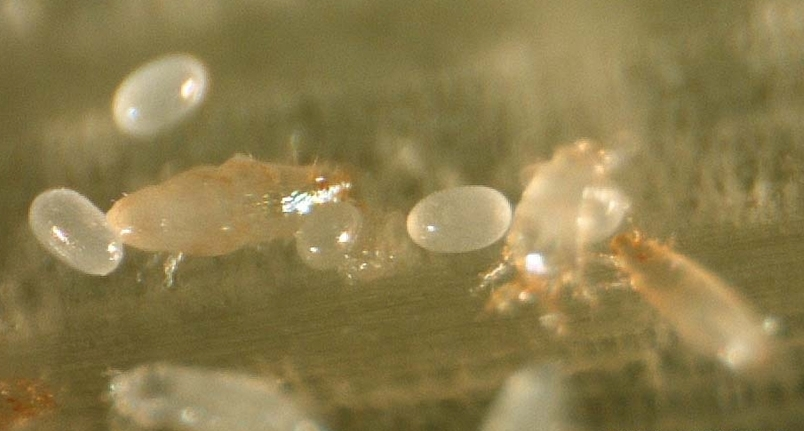
- Adults and eggs

Scientific classification
- Kingdom: Animalia
- Phylum: Arthropoda
- Subphylum: Chelicerata
- Class: Arachnida
- Order: Trombidiformes
- Family: Tarsonemidae
- Genus: Steneotarsonemus
- Species: S. spinki

Binomial name
- Steneotarsonemus spinki Smiley, 1967

= Steneotarsonemus spinki =

Species of mite

Steneotarsonemus spinki, the panicle rice mite, spinki mite, or rice tarsonemid mite, is a species of mite in the family Tarsonemidae, the white mites. It is a serious pest of rice in tropical Asia, Central America, and the Caribbean.

== Identification ==
The panicle rice mite is not visible to the naked eye. A minimum 20× hand lens is required to observe it on the inside of the leaf sheath. The mites are clear to straw-colored and are approximately 250 μm in length. The male has elongated rear legs containing a pair of elongated spines. The legs are carried above the body. Males are highly active and can be seen moving on the surface of the leaf. Females are ovoid-shaped. Larval stages, as well as eggs are about half the size of adults.

== Life history ==
Panicle rice mites are parthenogenetic (virgin females can produce male offspring). The female will then mate with the male offspring and produce eggs. A mated female produces an average of 55 eggs in her lifetime. The lifecycle in the laboratory can vary from 3 days at 86 °F (30 °C) to 20 days at 68 °F (20 °C). If held in the laboratory at 17.6 °F (−8.0 °C) for 72 hours, all panicle rice mites will die.

High temperatures and low rainfall are ideal for development of large populations of panicle rice mites in the field. Continuous rice culture and the sharing of equipment between fields is also conducive to building damaging populations of the mites.

== Distribution ==
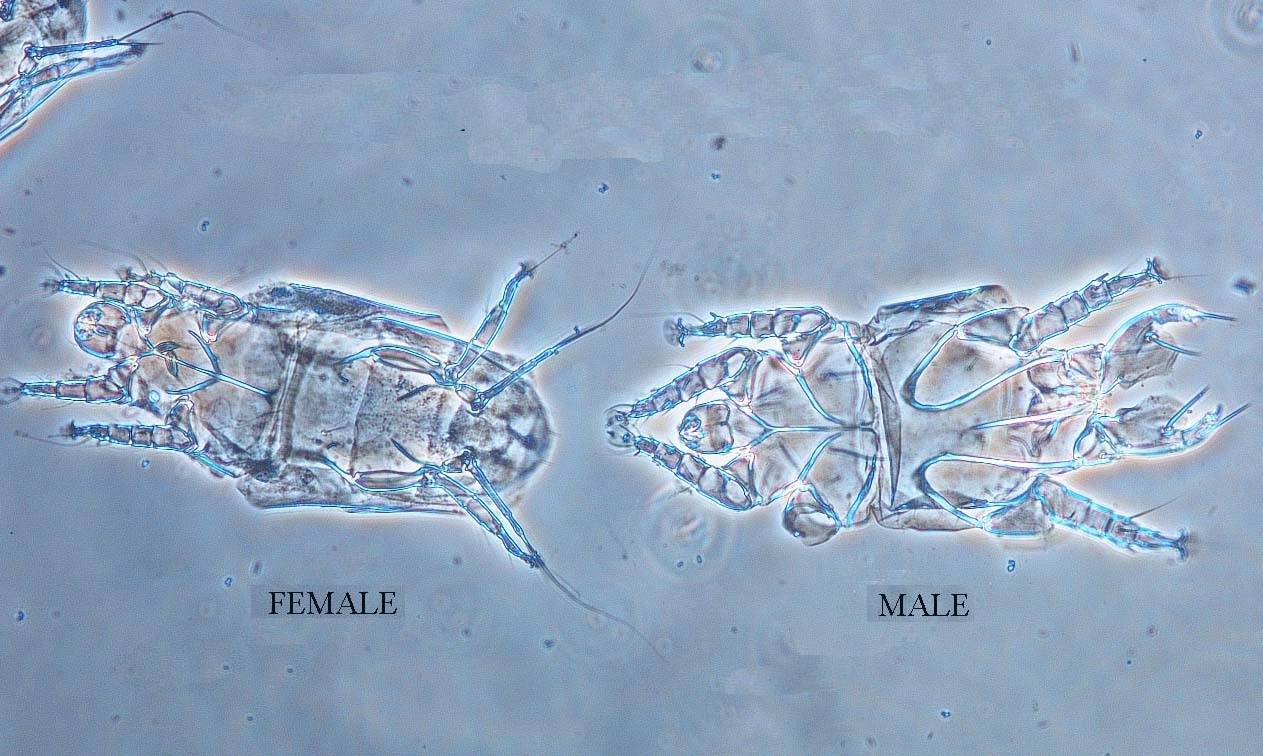
Female and male rice mites

The mite has been extremely destructive in rice fields of tropical regions of Asia, particularly in China and Taiwan, and in Central America. The mite has wiped out commercial rice fields in the Caribbean region.

The panicle rice mite was first introduced into the United States in 2007, and has been found in Louisiana, Arkansas, Texas, Ohio and New York. Until the discovery at UC Davis, it had never been identified in California or elsewhere in the western United States. On 13 July 2007, the United States Department of Agriculture confirmed the presence the panicle rice mite at a rice research facility in Alvin, Brazoria County, Texas. Other interceptions of this pest have also been reported at greenhouses in Ohio and Texas within the last 10 years.

In January 2009, officials at 11 University of California Davis greenhouses discovered panicle rice mite contamination. Although panicle rice mites are not thought to have the ability to thrive in the temperate climate of the United States, the area of southwest Louisiana has a sub-tropical climate with both high temperature and high humidity.

Panicle rice mites thrive under both of these conditions and may cause substantial economic losses when found in association with Burkholderia glumae (bacterial panicle blight) and Sarocladium oryzae (sheath rot) pathogens. These pathogens are both present in southwest Louisiana.

== Host plants ==
Panicle rice mites are pests of commercial rice (Oryza sativa), and completes its development on the invasive plant Oryza latifolia.

== Damage ==
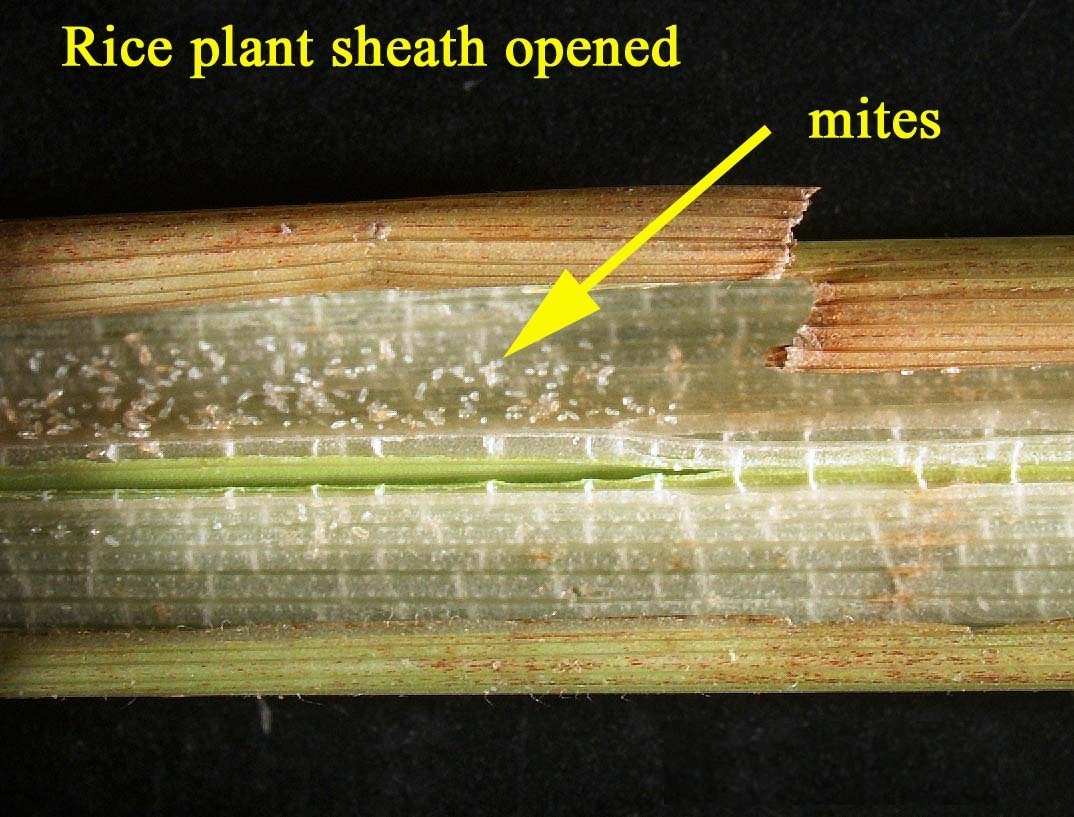
Rice plant infested with panicle rice mites

Feeding takes place behind the leaf sheath. The feeding lesion can be detected by cinnamon to chocolate-brown discoloration of the leaf sheath. When a new leaf begins development, a female will move to the new leaf sheath, produce male offspring and then establish a new feeding lesion. Thus, damage will often be observed on interior sheaths when the outer sheath is removed. This continues until the mite reaches the leaf nearest the stem. They also feed on developing panicles from the boot stage to the milk stage of heading.

Panicle rice mites cause damage to plants by directly feeding on leaf tissue in the leaf sheath and developing grains at the milk stage, and indirectly, by transmitting fungal pathogens. During feeding, they inject a toxic saliva. The mites have been associated with sheath rot as well as bacterial panicle blight. The mites can carry sheath rot spores on their body.

The mites cause damage to plant tissue which may facilitate entry of fungal pathogens into developing grains and the leaf sheath. This damage to grains results in sterility and deformed grains, straight-head, and parrot-beaking of grains.

Crop losses ranging from 5% – 90% have been attributed to panicle rice mites in a number of countries.

In the Americas, however, it has caused the largest economic impact. In Central America it has caused yield losses ranging from 30% to 90%.

== Management ==
=== Chemical ===
Chemical controls are usually not efficacious because the mites remain present in a water-sealed area of the plant—behind the leaf sheath and near the stem. Thus, systemic miticides may be the best option for chemical control.

=== Biological ===
Fungal pathogens and predatory mites may have the ability to suppress populations.

=== Cultural ===
Cultural controls include plowing stubble after harvesting crops, as well as ensuring no re-growth of plant material for winter, fallowing fields, rotation with an alternate crop, cleaning machinery before use in an un-infested field, sampling two weeks after planting to catch mite populations at low levels, and avoidance of second-cropping.

These cultural control methods as well as breeding for resistance have successfully suppressed populations in some infested countries.
