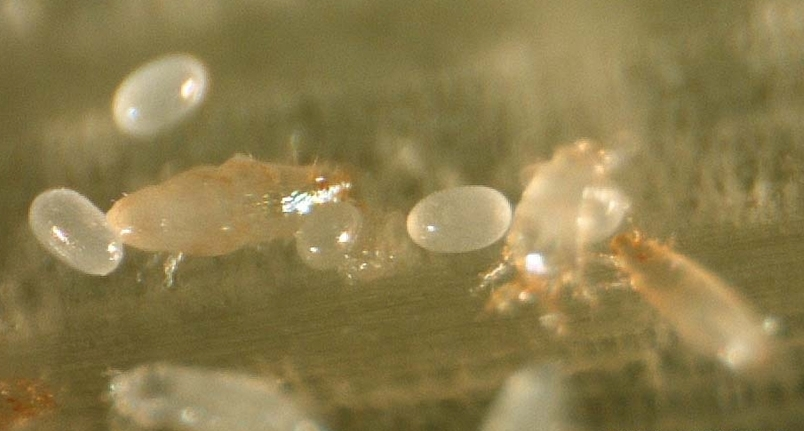
- Steneotarsonemus

Scientific classification
- Domain: Eukaryota
- Kingdom: Animalia
- Phylum: Arthropoda
- Subphylum: Chelicerata
- Class: Arachnida
- Order: Trombidiformes
- Family: Tarsonemidae
- Subfamily: Tarsoneminae
- Tribe: Steneotarsonemini
- Genus: Steneotarsonemus; Beer, 1954

Species
- see text

= Steneotarsonemus =

Genus of mites

Steneotarsonemus is a genus of plant-feeding mites.

== Taxonomy ==
Selected species (35) include;

- Steneotarsonemus laticeps
- Steneotarsonemus pallidus
- Steneotarsonemus spinki
