= International Bee Research Association =

Charitable organisation for bee science and beekeeping research

- Nickname: IBRA
- Formation: 1949-01-24
- Founder: Eva Crane
- Type: Charity
- Registration no.: Charity No: 209222
- Headquarters: Scout Bottom Farm, Mytholmroyd, West Yorkshire, HX7 5JS
- Coordinates: 53.72776704801619°N 1.975045660313937°W
- Chair: Fani Hatjina
- Key people: Mark Oakley; Elliud Muli
- Website: ibra.org.uk
- Formerly called: Bee Research Association

The International Bee Research Association (IBRA) is a United Kingdom–based charity and learned society dedicated to the advancement of bee science and beekeeping. Founded in 1949 by Eva Crane as the Bee Research Association, it adopted its present name in 1976 to reflect its international scope. IBRA publishes the peer‑reviewed Journal of Apicultural Research and the magazine Bee World, and maintains the Eva Crane Library and Archive, one of the world’s largest collections of literature on bees and apiculture. Through its publications, educational resources, and archival collections, the association has been recognised as a leading source of information on both managed and wild bee species.

== History ==
The International Bee Research Association traces its origins to 1945, when the British Beekeepers Association established a Research Committee to coordinate scientific work on beekeeping and allied subjects in the United Kingdom, with Eva Crane serving as secretary. Recognising the need for an independent body with broader funding and scope, Crane and her colleagues founded the Bee Research Association on 24 January 1949, with its headquarters initially based at her home.

The association quickly attracted members from both the scientific community and the beekeeping profession, and by the late 1940s it had several hundred members worldwide. In 1976, the organisation adopted its present name, the International Bee Research Association, to reflect its increasingly global remit and membership.

Over subsequent decades, IBRA expanded its activities to include the publication of specialist journals and books, the organisation of conferences and workshops, and the development of one of the world’s largest archival collections on bees and apiculture. Its headquarters are now located at Scout Bottom Farm in Mytholmroyd, West Yorkshire.

== Publications ==
Since its early years, the International Bee Research Association has been a major publisher of literature on bees and apiculture. Its flagship peer‑reviewed journal, the Journal of Apicultural Research, was first issued in 1962 and continues to publish original scientific papers on the biology, management, and health of honey bees and other bee species.

IBRA also publishes Bee World, a magazine founded in 1919 and acquired by the association in 1962, which provides accessible articles on beekeeping practice, policy, and applied research for a global readership of scientists and beekeepers.

In addition to its journals, IBRA has produced a wide range of books, technical manuals, and educational resources on topics such as hive management, bee diseases, pollination, and honey authentication. These publications are widely cited in apicultural research and used by practitioners, policymakers, and educators worldwide.

== Archives and collections ==
The International Bee Research Association maintains one of the world’s largest specialist collections on bees and apiculture. Its holdings include the Eva Crane Library and Archive, named after the association’s founder, which was transferred to the National Library of Wales in 2002. The collection comprises books, journals, research dissertations, reprints, glass negatives, lantern slides, videos, and extensive correspondence, with material dating from the late nineteenth century onwards.

The IBRA records also include papers of predecessor organisations such as the Apis Club (1913–1958) and the British Beekeepers Association Research Committee (1947–1950), as well as administrative files, reports, and conference proceedings of the association itself. These resources are regarded as a significant international archive for the study of bee science, beekeeping history, and pollination research.

== Activities and role ==
The International Bee Research Association promotes the value of bees by providing information on bee science and beekeeping worldwide. Its activities include the publication of specialist journals, books, and technical manuals, as well as the organisation of conferences, workshops, and training events for scientists and beekeepers.

IBRA’s remit extends beyond honey bees to encompass all bee species, including wild and solitary bees, reflecting its international scope. The association provides information services for researchers, policymakers, and practitioners, and is recognised as a source of independent expertise on pollination, bee health, and apicultural practice.

As a registered charity, IBRA is managed by a council of trustees drawn from several countries.

== See also ==
- Apimondia – Beekeeping organization
- Urban beekeeping – Practice of keeping bee colonies in urban areas
- apiary – Place containing beehives of honey bees
- National Bee Unit – Research institute in North Yorkshire, England
- Beekeeper – Person who keeps honey bees
