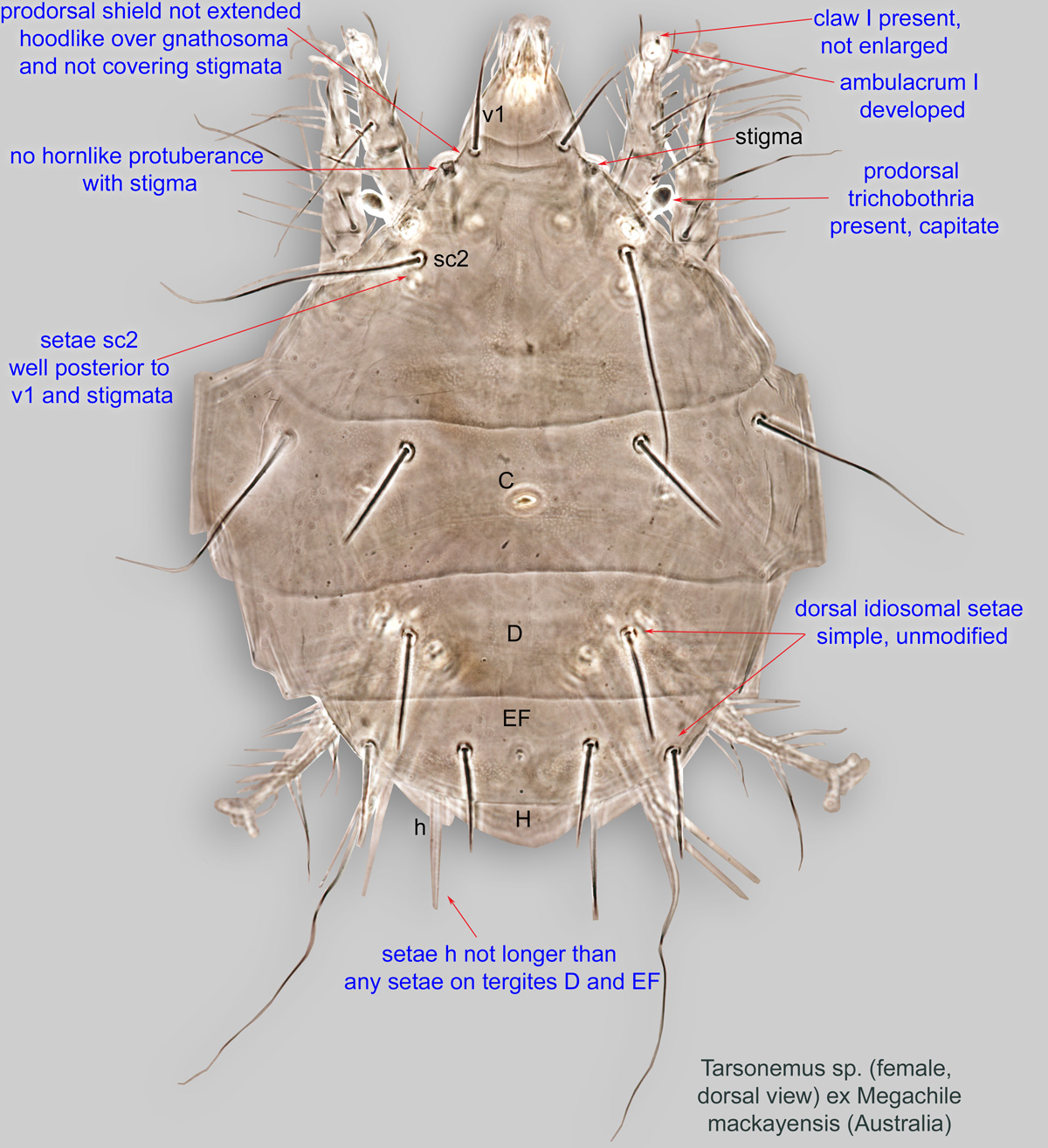
- female

Scientific classification
- Kingdom: Animalia
- Phylum: Arthropoda
- Subphylum: Chelicerata
- Class: Arachnida
- Order: Trombidiformes
- Family: Tarsonemidae
- Subfamily: Tarsoneminae
- Tribe: Tarsonemini
- Genus: Tarsonemus

= Tarsonemus =

Genus of mites

Tarsonemus is a genus of trombidiform mites within the family Tarsonemidae.

== Description ==
Adult Tarsonemus can be recognised by (among other features) simple unmodified setae on the dorsal idiosoma, two pairs of setae on the metapodosomal venter, short cheliceral stylets, and a gnathosomal capsule that is not conspicuously beaklike.

Females of Tarsonemus have a pair of clubbed trichobothria on the prodorsum, ambulacrum I developed, the tegula short and rounded, the fourth leg pair clearly longer than the tegula, and the segugal apodeme developed.

== Ecology ==
Tarsonemus mites live in various habitats including soil, litter, both woody and herbaceous plants, decaying wood, underneath bark (where they are associated with insects), animal nests, bracket fungi, stored foods, laboratory cultures and house dust. They are mostly fungivores and some are economically important pests of commercial mushroom cultures and laboratory fungal cultures. They can sometimes carry fungal spores on their bodies. A few Tarsonemus species are herbivores (attacking crop or ornamental plants) or feed on exudates of living animals.

== Distribution ==
The genus overall has a cosmopolitan distribution. Additionally, the bee-associated species have been recorded from every zoogeographical region except Afrotropical.

== Species ==
There are over 280 Tarsonemus species described, grouped into the three subgenera of Tarsonemus sensu stricto, Chaetotarsonemus and Schaarschmidtia. Some of them are:

- Tarsonemus apis. Found on honey bees (Apis).
- Tarsonemus bahiensis. Found on leaves of stinking passionflower (Passiflora foetida) and torch ginger (Etlingera elatior).
- Tarsonemus bakeri. Found on sooty mould in citrus orchards.
- Tarsonemus blakemorei. Found on honey bees.
- Tarsonemus cacao. Found on branches of cacao tree (Theobroma cacao).
- Tarsonemus crassus. Found on bark beetles of genus Scolytus and may help transmit Dutch elm disease.
- Tarsonemus floricolus. Found in house dust and (in one case) human sputum.
- Tarsonemus fusarii. Found on honey bees and bumblebees (Bombus).
- Tarsonemus granarius. Found in stored grain.
- Tarsonemus minimax. Found on honey bees.
- Tarsonemus parawaitei. Found on orchard and ornamental plants.
- Tarsonemus pipermenta. It is a mite pest of peppermint and spearmint.
- Tarsonemus platynopodae. Found on carpenter bees (Xylocopa).
- Tarsonemus xylocopae. Found on carpenter bees.
