= Steneotarsonemus laticeps =

Scientific classification
- Domain: Eukaryota
- Kingdom: Animalia
- Phylum: Arthropoda
- Subphylum: Chelicerata
- Class: Arachnida
- Order: Trombidiformes
- Family: Tarsonemidae
- Genus: Steneotarsonemus
- Species: S. laticeps

Binomial name
- Steneotarsonemus laticeps Halbert, 1923

Species of mite

Steneotarsonemus laticeps, the bulb scale mite, is a species of mite in the family Tarsonemidae, the white mites. Amongst plants attacked by this mite are species of Narcissus.

== Bibliography ==
- Gratwick, Marion, ed. (1992). "Bulb scale mite". Crop Pests in the UK. Dordrecht: Springer Netherlands. pp. 334–337. doi:10.1007/978-94-011-1490-5_66. ISBN 978-94-011-1490-5.
