= Eva Crane =

British physicist, beekeeper and entomologist

Eva crane
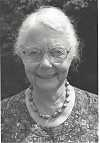
- Eva Crane; Photo by Mary Fisher, courtesy of International Bee Research Association
- Born: 12 June 1912; London, UK
- Died: 6 September 2007 (aged 95); Slough, UK

Eva Crane, born Ethel Eva Widdowson (12 June 1912 – 6 September 2007), was a British researcher and author on the subjects of bees and beekeeping. Trained as a quantum mathematician, she changed her field of interest to bees, and spent decades researching bees, traveling to more than 60 countries, often in challenging conditions.

== Early life ==
Eva Crane was born Ethel Eva Widdowson in Dulwich in London to Harry and Rose (née Elphick) Widdowson on 12 June 1912. Her father, Thomas Henry (known as Harry), was from Grantham in Lincolnshire and moved to Battersea as a grocer's assistant and eventually owned a stationery business, whilst her mother Rose, originally from Dorking, worked as a dressmaker. Her sister, Elsie Widdowson, five years her senior, grew up to be one of the most influential nutritionists of the twentieth century. The family was Plymouth Brethren.

== Education and career ==
Eva and Elsie attended Sydenham County Grammar School for Girls and both won prizes and scholarships. Eva attended King's College London, where she was one of only two women then studying mathematics at the University of London, completing her degree in two years, then earned a master's degree in quantum mechanics.

Eva earned a Ph.D. in 1941 in nuclear physics. She became a lecturer in physics at Sheffield University. She married James Crane (d. 1978), a stockbroker serving in the Royal Navy Volunteer Reserve, in 1942.

== Bees ==
Her interest in bees began when she and her husband received a beehive as a wedding present; the giver had hoped that it would help supplement their wartime sugar ration. She became a member of the British Beekeepers Association and quickly became the secretary of its research committee. In 1949 she founded the Bee Research Association which later became the International Bee Research Association.

Crane wrote over 180 papers, articles, and books, many when she was in her seventies and eighties. Honey: A Comprehensive Survey (1975), in which she contributed several important chapters, and edited, came about because she told the publisher (Heinemann Press) that a book on the subject was sorely needed. Although now out of print, it remains the most significant review on the subject ever written. A Book of Honey (1980) and The Archaeology of Beekeeping (1983) reflected her strong interests in nutrition and the ancient past of beekeeping.

Her two lengthy books, Bees and Beekeeping: science, practice and world resources (1990; 614 pages) and The World History of Beekeeping and Honey Hunting (1999; 682 pages) are regarded as seminal in the beekeeping world. Along with writing many books and articles, Crane also helped create a beekeeping library, which held many books on bees and beekeeping, and turned the small journal Bee World, founded in 1919 by Ahmad Zaki Abu Shadi, into a well-known scientific magazine.

Eva Crane died at the age of 95 in Slough, United Kingdom.

The New York Times reported that "Dr. Crane wrote some of the most important books on bees and apiculture" and noted "Her older sister, Elsie Widdowson, who never retired either, helped revolutionize the field of nutrition, showing similar energy chasing seals on ice floes to study their eating habits."
