= Modomnoc =

Irish saint and missionary

Modomnóc of Ossory
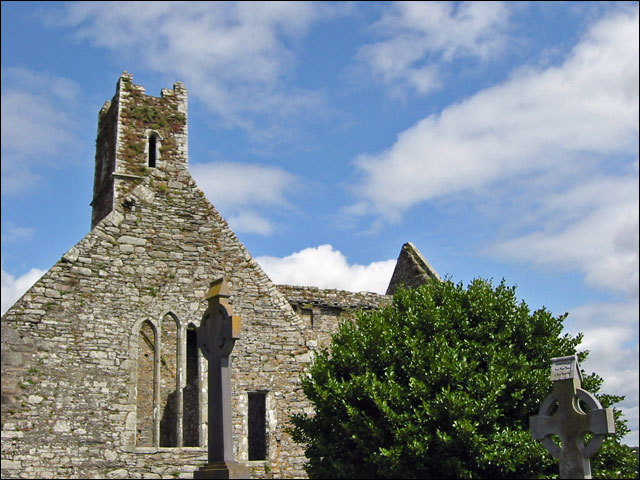
- Timoleague Friary
- Born: 500s
- Died: c. 550
- Feast: 13 February
- Attributes: bees

St. Modomnóc of Ossory (also Domnóc and Dominic) (died c. 550) was an Irish saint and missionary in Osraige who was a disciple of St. David of Wales and a member of the Uí Néill royal family. His feast day is February 13.

== Life ==
Modomnoc's name is likely to have been Dominic or Donogh, as the words "my", ("mo") "little" and "dear" were added to Irish saint's names; hence Domnóc's name is often rendered mo Domnóc or Modomnóc. He left Ireland to practice priesthood and crossed the sea to Wales to study under St. David at Menevia.

== Beekeeper ==
One of the best known stories regarding Saint Modomnoc concerns his work as a beekeeper in Saint David's monastery . Bees were kept both for their honey and the production of wax. He was never stung. When the time came for him to return to Ireland, three times the bees followed in great swarm and settled on the mast. With Saint David's consent he let the bees sail with him and introduced the honeybee to Ireland on his return from Wales.

In a little boat, from the east, over the pure-colored sea, my Domnoc brought the gifted race of Ireland's bees. ~ Félire Óengusso

Modomnoc's talking to his bees is in keeping with an Irish folklore custom of ‘Telling the Bees’ which ensures that the bees not feel any offence due to exclusion from family affairs and so will remain with the hive. It was believed that if one didn't tell the bees of a wedding, a birth, or a death they would take offence and leave. This same custom forms the basis of John Greenleaf Whittier's poem, "Telling the Bees".

== Bishop ==
Upon returning home he continued his religious services at Tybroughney. He is said to have been honoured with the episcopal dignity, about the middle of the 6th century.
