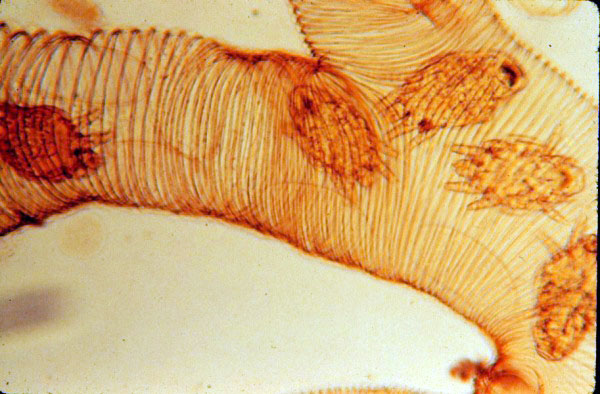
- Tracheal mite - Acarapis woodi

Scientific classification
- Domain: Eukaryota
- Kingdom: Animalia
- Phylum: Arthropoda
- Subphylum: Chelicerata
- Class: Arachnida
- Order: Trombidiformes
- Family: Tarsonemidae
- Subfamily: Acarapinae
- Tribe: Acarapini
- Genus: Acarapis; Hirst, 1921

= Acarapis =

Genus of mites

Acarapis is a genus of mites belonging to the family Tarsonemidae.

The species of this genus are found in Europe and Northern America.

Species:

- Acarapis dorsalis Morgenthaler, 1934
- Acarapis externus Morgenthaler, 1931
- Acarapis vagans Schneider, 1941
- Acarapis woodi (Rennie, 1921)
