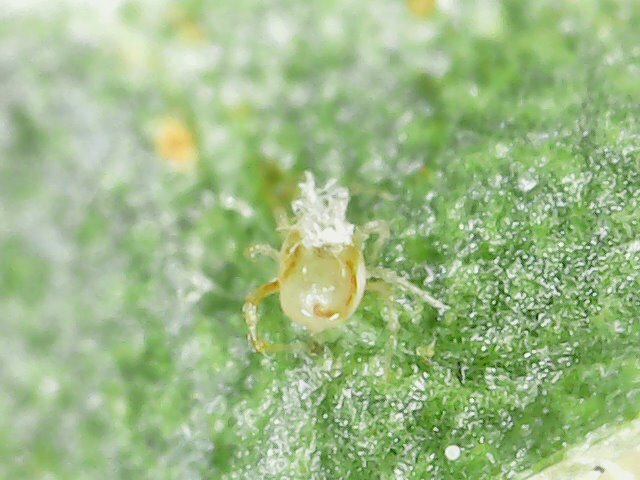

Scientific classification
- Kingdom: Animalia
- Phylum: Arthropoda
- Subphylum: Chelicerata
- Class: Arachnida
- Order: Mesostigmata
- Family: Phytoseiidae
- Genus: Neoseiulus
- Species: N. californicus

Binomial name
- Neoseiulus californicus McGregor, 1954

Synonyms
- Neoseiulus chilenensis (Dosse); Typhlodromus californicus McGregor; Amblyseius californicus

= Neoseiulus californicus =

Species of mite

Neoseiulus californicus is a predatory mite that feeds on Tetranychid mites. This species was first described on lemons from California under the name Typhlodromus californicus in 1954.

== Description ==
The mite 0.4 mm long is yellowish in color with eight legs. Males are smaller than females. The larvae are translucent. Females lay 2-4 eggs a day. Eggs take 1.5–4 days to hatch depending on temperatures. The adult female mites have the strongest ability to endure starvation, with an average survival time of about 8.16 days on just water while maintaining the ability to lay eggs, although in fewer quantities.

== Distribution ==
This species has been found in the United States (California, Texas, Florida), Chile, Argentina, Japan, South Africa, parts of southern Europe, and all along the border of the Mediterranean Sea on fruit and vegetable crops.

== Pest control ==
Neoseiulus californicus is used to control the twospotted spider mite (Tetranychus urticae), cyclamen mite (Phytonemus pallidus), Oligonychus perseae, Thrips and other small insects.
