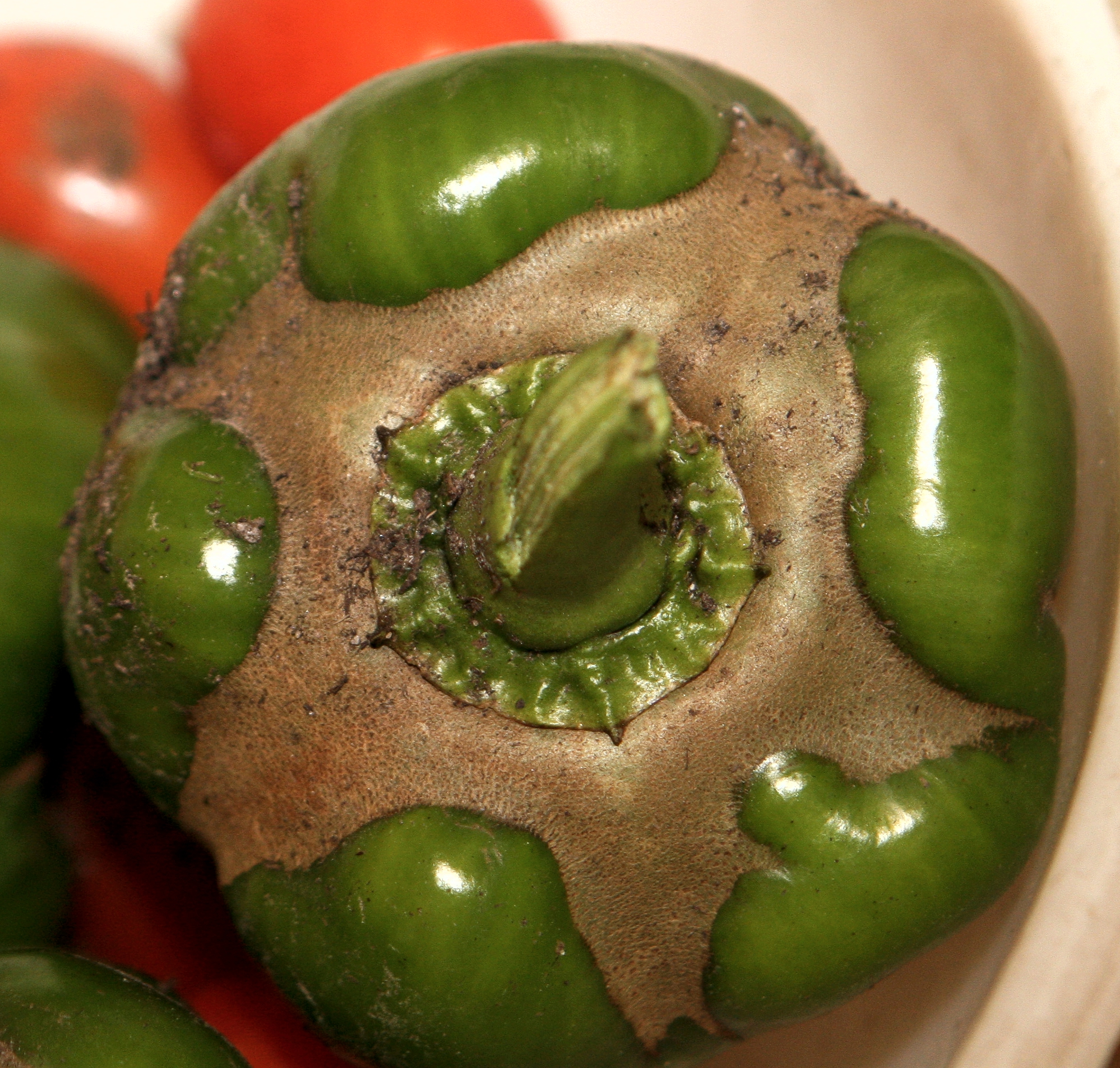
- Pepper with cyclamen mite damage

Scientific classification
- Domain: Eukaryota
- Kingdom: Animalia
- Phylum: Arthropoda
- Subphylum: Chelicerata
- Class: Arachnida
- Order: Trombidiformes
- Family: Tarsonemidae
- Genus: Phytonemus
- Species: P. pallidus

Binomial name
- Phytonemus pallidus (Banks, 1901)

= Steneotarsonemus pallidus =

Species of mite

The cyclamen mite (Phytonemus pallidus) is a tiny mite often found as a pest on African violets and cyclamen plants. It is invisible to the naked eye, measuring only 0.02 cm (0.01 inch) at maturity. It requires a warm, humid environment, and is therefore problematic primarily in greenhouses.
