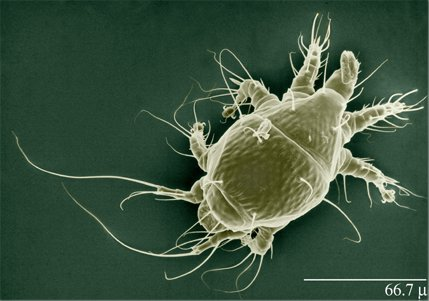
- Acarapis woodi

Scientific classification
- Kingdom: Animalia
- Phylum: Arthropoda
- Subphylum: Chelicerata
- Class: Arachnida
- Order: Trombidiformes
- Infraorder: Eleutherengona
- Superfamily: Tarsonemoidea
- Family: Tarsonemidae; Kramer, 1877

Diversity
- 45 genera, > 500 species

= Tarsonemidae =

Family of mites

Tarsonemidae is a family of mites, also called thread-footed mites or white mites.

Only a limited number of tarsonemid genera (Steneotarsonemus, Polyphagotarsonemus, Phytonemus, Floridotarsonemus and Tarsonemus) are known to feed on higher plants while most species in this family feed on the thin-walled mycelia of fungi or possibly algal bodies. Even among the plant-feeding tarsonemid mites, most are confined to areas of new growth where cell walls are thin and therefore easily pierced. However two species (the "broad mite" Polyphagotarsonemus latus and the "cyclamen mite" Steneotarsonemus pallidus) are able to feed on older leaves because of their ability to inject toxins during feeding (presumably of salivary gland origin) causing an increase of thin walled cells surrounding feeding sites. This proliferation of new growth often results in leaves that appear stunted, puckered and twisted.

Some Tarsonemidae are associated with insects. For example, three tribes of Acarapinae are insect parasites: Acarapini are parasites of Apis bees (the tribe includes notable pest Acarapis woodi), Coreitarsonemini live in odoriferous glands of leaf-footed bugs (Coreidae) and Podotarsonemini attach to wings of tetrigid grasshoppers.

== Taxonomy ==
=== Subdivision ===
- Subfamily Pseudotarsonemoidinae
  - Tribe Tarsonemellini
  - Tribe Pseudotarsonemoidini
- Subfamily Acarapinae
  - Tribe Coreitarsonemini
- Subfamily Tarsoneminae
  - Tribe Hemitarsonemini
  - Tribe Steneotarsonemini
  - Tribe Tarsonemini
  - Tribe Pseudacarapin

=== Selected genera ===
- Acarapis
- Floridotarsonemus
- Phytonemus
- Polyphagotarsonemus
- Steneotarsonemus
- Tarsonemus

== Control ==
While little pest management research has been done on the majority of tarsonemid species, comprehensive studies have been made into the biological and chemical control of the cyclamen mite and the broad mite. Chemical trials demonstrated that endosulfan and dicofol consistently reduced densities of P. latus and S. pallidus, and planting stock can be effectively decontaminated through fumigation with methyl bromide or 1,2-dibromoethane. Three entomogenous fungi, Beauveria bassiana, Metarhizium anisopliae, and Paecilomyces fumosoroseus, can effectively manage broad mite infestations, with B. bassiana providing the greatest reduction. Predatory phytoseiid mites, in the genus Neoseiulus, can also successfully control P. latus and S. pallidus under greenhouse and field conditions.
