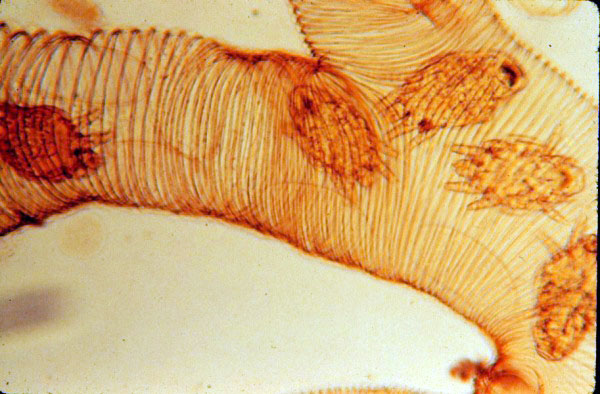

Scientific classification
- Kingdom: Animalia
- Phylum: Arthropoda
- Subphylum: Chelicerata
- Class: Arachnida
- Order: Trombidiformes
- Family: Tarsonemidae
- Genus: Acarapis
- Species: A. woodi

Binomial name
- Acarapis woodi (Rennie, 1921)

= Acarapis woodi =

Species of mite

Acarapis woodi is an internal parasite affecting honey bees. Acarapis woodi mites live and reproduce in the tracheae of the bees. The mites are generally less than 175 micrometres (0.007 in) long and can only be seen under a microscope. The symptoms of infestation were originally observed on the Isle of Wight in 1904 but were not described until 1921. The disease was originally called the Isle of Wight Disease; it is now called acarine disease or acarapisosis after the subclass to which the mites belong. Mercedes Delfinado identified the presence of Acarapsis woodi in the USA.

The mites parasitize young bees up to two weeks old through the tracheal tube openings. The female mite attaches 5–7 eggs to the tracheal walls, where the larvae hatch and develop into adult mites in 11–15 days. The mites pierce the tracheal tube walls with their mouthparts and feed on the haemolymph of the bees. More than a hundred mites can populate the tracheae and weaken the bees. The outward appearance of acarine disease is similar to that of other diseases in honey bees; "they crawl around in the front of the hive and climb blades of grass, unable to fly." It can cause significant colony loss due to "obstruction of air ducts, lesions in the tracheal walls, and the depletion of haemolymph".

Other mites similar in appearance include Acarapis externus and Acarapis dorsalis.

== In popular culture ==
A song about acarine disease, titled "Acarine", was released in 2019 by Australian rock band King Gizzard & the Lizard Wizard.
