= Thomas William Cowan =

British beekeeper (1840–1926)

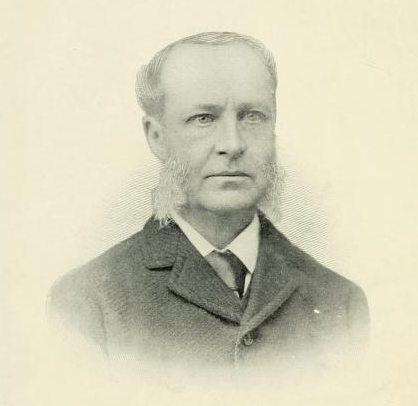
Thomas William Cowan

Thomas William Cowan (1840–1926) was a co-founder and president of the British Beekeepers' Association.

== Biography ==
Cowan was born in 1840 in Saint Petersburg, Russia, and died in 1926 in Clevedon, United Kingdom. In the UK census he described himself as a civil engineer and a farmer.

Cowan travelled to the US several times and in 1900 settled in Monterey.

Cowan founded the Beekeepers' Association with Charles Nash Abbott (1830-1894) in 1874: "For the Encouragement, Improvement and Advancement of Bee Culture in the United Kingdom, particularly as a means of bettering the Condition of Cottagers and the Agricultural Labouring Classes, as well as the advocacy of humanity to the industrious labourer – the Honey Bee."

Cowan designed the cylindrical honey extractor. He was the editor of the British Bee Journal and the Bee Keepers' Record.

Cowan authored books on beekeeping and related topics and was a collector of beekeeping books. Upon his death, his library numbered more than 1,800 books, which formed the basis of the Cowan Memorial Library.

== Selected publications ==
- The Honey Bee: Its Natural History, Anatomy, and Physiology (1890)
- British Bee-Keeper's Guide Book (1911)
