= Irish Bee Conservation Project =

Bee conservation charity in Ireland

- Nickname: IBCP
- Formation: 2019; 7 years ago
- Registration no.: 20206199
- Legal status: Registered charity
- Purpose: Bee conservation
- Region served: Ireland
- Website: www.ibcp.ie

The Irish Bee Conservation Project is a charitable organisation in Ireland that seeks to conserve all native Irish bee species. It has four "pillars of support" in its work: providing habitats, increasing biodiversity, holding education events and performing research into the decline of bee species.

== History ==
The Irish Bee Conservation Project (IBCP) grew out of a research project looking at honeybees and the Varroa mite and was formed in 2019 as a not for profit private company limited by guarantee. That same year it designed and installed its first honeybee "lodges" in Fota Wildlife Park, County Cork.

In 2021, the IBCP registered as a charity with the Irish Charities Regulator.

== Projects ==
The charity developed and installed a pollinator trail, in conjunction with the Office of Public Works, at Fota Gardens. Opened in 2021, the walking trail consists of a series of 12 stations with QR codes which provide links to information about the gardens, bees and other pollinators.

Other projects by the IBCP include the installation of 24 wild bee lodges at Lough Gur, County Limerick. These lodges are designed to replace lost natural habitats. Since 2020, it has been helping Randal Plunkett, 21st Baron of Dunsany with the rewilding of the Dunsany Estate in County Meath by providing advice and bee lodges.

In 2022, the charity hosted a free educational event at the South East Technological University's Bealtaine Living Earth Festival. The charity also has an apiary holding native honeybees, where it performs breeding and commenced a research project into varroa mite tolerance.
