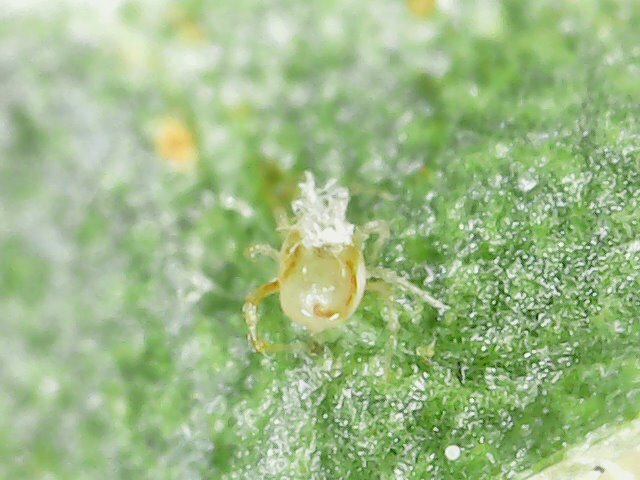
- Neoseiulus californicus

Scientific classification
- Kingdom: Animalia
- Phylum: Arthropoda
- Subphylum: Chelicerata
- Class: Arachnida
- Order: Mesostigmata
- Family: Phytoseiidae
- Subfamily: Amblyseiinae
- Genus: Neoseiulus; Hughes, 1948

= Neoseiulus =

Genus of mites

Neoseiulus is a genus of mites in the Phytoseiidae family.

== Species ==
- Neoseiulus accessus (Ueckermann & Loots, 1988)
- Neoseiulus aceriae (Gupta, 1975)
- Neoseiulus aegyptocitri (Kandeel & El-Halawany, 1986)
- Neoseiulus agrestis (Karg, 1960)
- Neoseiulus akakius Beard, 2001
- Neoseiulus aleurites Ragusa & Athias-Henriot, 1983
- Neoseiulus alidis (Kolodochka, 1989)
- Neoseiulus allenrolfius (Denmark, 1993)
- Neoseiulus alpinus (Schweizer, 1922)
- Neoseiulus alustoni (Livshitz & Kuznetsov, 1972)
- Neoseiulus amicus (Chant, 1959)
- Neoseiulus angeliquae (Schicha, 1987)
- Neoseiulus anonymus (Chant & Baker, 1965)
- Neoseiulus apeuthus Beard, 2001
- Neoseiulus apkutik (Chant & Hansell, 1971)
- Neoseiulus arcticus (Chant & Hansell, 1971)
- Neoseiulus arenarius Denmark & Edland, 2002
- Neoseiulus arenillus (Denmark & Muma, 1967)
- Neoseiulus argillaceus (Kolodochka & Bondarenko, 1993)
- Neoseiulus aridus (De Leon, 1962)
- Neoseiulus arutunjani (Wainstein & Beglyarov, 1971)
- Neoseiulus astutus (Beglyarov, 1960)
- Neoseiulus atrii (Karg, 1989)
- Neoseiulus atsak (Chant & Hansell, 1971)
- Neoseiulus australograminis (Wainstein, 1977)
- Neoseiulus balisungsongus (Schicha & Corpuz-Raros, 1992)
- Neoseiulus baraki (Athias-Henriot, 1966)
- Neoseiulus bariles (Schicha & Corpuz-Raros, 1992)
- Neoseiulus barkeri Hughes, 1948
- Neoseiulus baticola (Athias-Henriot, 1977)
- Neoseiulus bayviewensis (Schicha, 1977)
- Neoseiulus bellinus (Womersley, 1954)
- Neoseiulus bellottii (Moraes & Mesa, 1988)
- Neoseiulus benicus (El-Badry, 1968)
- Neoseiulus benjamini (Schicha, 1981)
- Neoseiulus bheraensis Chaudhri, Akbar & Rasool, 1979
- Neoseiulus bicaudus (Wainstein, 1962)
- Neoseiulus bindrai (Gupta, 1977)
- Neoseiulus brevicalix (Karg, 1993)
- Neoseiulus brevispinus (Kennett, 1958)
- Neoseiulus brigarinus Beard, 2001
- Neoseiulus buxeus Beard, 2001
- Neoseiulus byssus Denmark & Knisley, in Knisley & Denmark 1978
- Neoseiulus californicus (McGregor, 1954)
- Neoseiulus callunae (Willmann, 1952)
- Neoseiulus calorai (Corpuz-Raros & Rimando, 1966)
- Neoseiulus camarus (El-Badry, 1968)
- Neoseiulus campanus Beard, 2001
- Neoseiulus cangaro (Schicha, 1987)
- Neoseiulus caobae (De Leon, 1965)
- Neoseiulus cappari Beard, 2001
- Neoseiulus caribbeanus (De Leon, 1965)
- Neoseiulus caruncula Chaudhri, Akbar & Rasool, 1979
- Neoseiulus carverae (Schicha, 1993)
- Neoseiulus casimiri (Schicha & Elshafie, 1980)
- Neoseiulus cavagnaroi (Schuster, 1966)
- Neoseiulus ceratoni (Ueckermann & Loots, 1988)
- Neoseiulus certus (Kolodochka, 1990)
- Neoseiulus chascomensis (Sheals, 1962)
- Neoseiulus chaudhrii Chant & McMurtry, 2003
- Neoseiulus chinensis Chant & McMurtry, 2003
- Neoseiulus cinctutus (Livshitz & Kuznetsov, 1972)
- Neoseiulus coatesi (Schultz, 1972)
- Neoseiulus collegae (De Leon, 1962)
- Neoseiulus comitatus (De Leon, 1962)
- Neoseiulus communis Denmark & Edland, 2002
- Neoseiulus conconiensis (Karg, 1976)
- Neoseiulus constrictatus (El-Banhawy, 1984)
- Neoseiulus conterminus (Kolodochka, 1990)
- Neoseiulus corycus (Schuster, 1966)
- Neoseiulus crataegi (Jorgensen & Chant, 1960)
- Neoseiulus cree (Chant & Hansell, 1971)
- Neoseiulus cryptomeriae (Zhu & Chen, 1983)
- Neoseiulus cucumeris (Oudemans, 1930)
- Neoseiulus cucumeroides (De Leon, 1959)
- Neoseiulus culpus Denmark & Evans, in Denmark, Evans, Aguilar, Vargas & Ochoa 1999
- Neoseiulus curvus (Wu & Li, 1985)
- Neoseiulus cydnodactylon (Shehata & Zaher, 1969)
- Neoseiulus cynodonae (Gupta, 1977)
- Neoseiulus depilo Khan, Chaudhri & Khan, 1990
- Neoseiulus desertus (Chant, 1957)
- Neoseiulus dicircellatus (Wu & Ou, 1999)
- Neoseiulus dieteri (Schicha, 1979)
- Neoseiulus disparis (Chaudhri, Akbar & Rasool, 1979)
- Neoseiulus dissipatus (Kolodochka, 1991)
- Neoseiulus dodonaeae (Schicha, 1980)
- Neoseiulus dungeri (Karg, 1977)
- Neoseiulus echinochlovorus (Schicha & Corpuz-Raros, 1992)
- Neoseiulus edestes Beard, 2001
- Neoseiulus ellesmerei (Chant & Hansell, 1971)
- Neoseiulus engaddensis (Amitai & Swirski, 1970)
- Neoseiulus eremicus Chaudhri, Akbar & Rasool, 1979
- Neoseiulus eremitus Beard, 2001
- Neoseiulus erugatus Ragusa & Athias-Henriot, 1983
- Neoseiulus esculentus (El-Badry, 1968)
- Neoseiulus eucolli (Karg, 1993)
- Neoseiulus exiguus (van der Merwe, 1968)
- Neoseiulus extricatus (Kolodochka, 1991)
- Neoseiulus fallacis (Garman, 1948)
- Neoseiulus fallacoides Tuttle & Muma, 1973
- Neoseiulus fauveli (Athias-Henriot, 1978)
- Neoseiulus ficilocus (Schicha & Corpuz-Raros, 1992)
- Neoseiulus ficusi (Gupta, 1986)
- Neoseiulus foramenis (Karg, 1970)
- Neoseiulus gansuensis (Wu & Lan, 1991)
- Neoseiulus garciai (Schicha & Corpuz-Raros, 1992)
- Neoseiulus ghanii (Muma, 1967)
- Neoseiulus gracilentus (Hirschmann, 1962)
- Neoseiulus gracilis (Muma, 1962)
- Neoseiulus haimatus (Ehara, 1967)
- Neoseiulus hamus (Karg, 1993)
- Neoseiulus hanselli (Chant & Yoshida-Shaul, 1978)
- Neoseiulus harrowi (Collyer, 1964)
- Neoseiulus harveyi (McMurtry & Schicha, 1987)
- Neoseiulus helmi (Schicha, 1987)
- Neoseiulus herbarius (Wainstein, 1960)
- Neoseiulus hexaporus Döker, 2023
- Neoseiulus hirotae (Ehara, 1985)
- Neoseiulus houstoni (Schicha, 1987)
- Neoseiulus huffakeri (Schuster & Pritchard, 1963)
- Neoseiulus huron (Chant & Hansell, 1971)
- Neoseiulus idaeus Denmark & Muma, 1973
- Neoseiulus imbricatus (Corpuz-Raros & Rimando, 1966)
- Neoseiulus inabanus (Ehara, 1972)
- Neoseiulus inak (Chant & Hansell, 1971)
- Neoseiulus indicus (Narayanan & Kaur, 1960)
- Neoseiulus inflatus (Kuznetsov, 1984)
- Neoseiulus innuit (Chant & Hansell, 1971)
- Neoseiulus inornatus (Schuster & Pritchard, 1963)
- Neoseiulus insularis (Athias-Henriot, 1978)
- Neoseiulus interfolius (De Leon, 1962)
- Neoseiulus iroquois (Chant & Hansell, 1971)
- Neoseiulus jiangxiensis (Zhu & Chen, 1982)
- Neoseiulus kapjik (Chant & Hansell, 1971)
- Neoseiulus kearnae Beard, 2001
- Neoseiulus kennetti (Schuster & Pitchard, 1963)
- Neoseiulus kermanicus Daneshvar, 1987
- Neoseiulus kerri Muma, 1965
- Neoseiulus kodryensis (Kolodochka, 1980)
- Neoseiulus kolodotshkai (Kuznetsov, 1984)
- Neoseiulus koyamanus (Ehara & Yokogawa, 1977)
- Neoseiulus krugeri (van der Merwe, 1968)
- Neoseiulus lablabi (Ghai & Menon, 1967)
- Neoseiulus lamticus (Athias-Henriot, 1977)
- Neoseiulus lateralis (Tuttle & Muma, 1973)
- Neoseiulus latoventris (Karg & Edland, 1987)
- Neoseiulus lecki Beard, 2001
- Neoseiulus leigongshanensis (Wu & Lan, 1989)
- Neoseiulus letrauformis (Schicha & Corpuz-Raros, 1992)
- Neoseiulus leucophaeus (Athias-Henriot, 1959)
- Neoseiulus liangi Chant & McMurtry, 2003
- Neoseiulus liticellus (Athias-Henriot, 1966)
- Neoseiulus longilaterus (Athias-Henriot, 1957)
- Neoseiulus longisiphonulus (Wu & Lan, 1989)
- Neoseiulus longispinosus (Evans, 1952)
- Neoseiulus loxtoni (Schicha, 1979)
- Neoseiulus loxus (Schuster & Pritchard, 1963)
- Neoseiulus lula (Pritchard & Baker, 1962)
- Neoseiulus luppovae (Wainstein, 1962)
- Neoseiulus lushanensis (Zhu & Chen, 1985)
- Neoseiulus lyrinus Beard, 2001
- Neoseiulus maigsius (Schicha & Corpuz-Raros, 1992)
- Neoseiulus makedonicus (Papadoulis & Emmanouel, 1991)
- Neoseiulus makilingensis (Schicha & Corpuz-Raros, 1992)
- Neoseiulus makuwa (Ehara, 1972)
- Neoseiulus malaban Beard, 2001
- Neoseiulus marginatus (Wainstein, 1961)
- Neoseiulus marinellus (Muma, 1962)
- Neoseiulus marinus (Willmann, 1952)
- Neoseiulus martinicensis Moraes & Kreiter, in Moraes, Kreiter & Lofego 2000
- Neoseiulus mazurensis (Kropczynska, 1965)
- Neoseiulus melaleucae (McMurtry & Schicha, 1987)
- Neoseiulus melinis Lofego & Moraes, 2003
- Neoseiulus micmac (Chant & Hansell, 1971)
- Neoseiulus mistassini (Chant & Hansell, 1971)
- Neoseiulus monomacroseta (Tseng, 1976)
- Neoseiulus montanus (Wainstein, 1962)
- Neoseiulus montanus Tuttle & Muma, 1973
- Neoseiulus msabahaensis (Moraes & McMurtry, 1989)
- Neoseiulus muganicus (Abbasova, 1970)
- Neoseiulus multiporus (Wu & Li, 1987)
- Neoseiulus mumae (Shehata & Zaher, 1969)
- Neoseiulus mumai (Denmark, 1965)
- Neoseiulus myrtea Chaudhri, Akbar & Rasool, 1979
- Neoseiulus namurensis (Fain, Vangeluwe, Degreef & Wauthy, 1993)
- Neoseiulus neoaurescens (Moraes & Mesa, 1988)
- Neoseiulus neoparaki (Ehara, 1972)
- Neoseiulus neoreticuloides (Liang & Hu, 1988)
- Neoseiulus neotunus (Denmark & Muma, 1973)
- Neoseiulus nescapi (Chant & Hansell, 1971)
- Neoseiulus nodus Denmark & Knisley, in Knisley & Denmark 1978
- Neoseiulus noosae (McMurtry & Schicha, 1987)
- Neoseiulus novaescotiae (Chant, 1959)
- Neoseiulus ojibwa (Chant & Hansell, 1971)
- Neoseiulus orientalis (El-Halawany & Kandeel, 1985)
- Neoseiulus ornatus (Athias-Henriot, 1957)
- Neoseiulus oryzacolus Daneshvar, 1987
- Neoseiulus ostium Khan, Chaudhri & Khan, 1990
- Neoseiulus paloratus Beard, 2001
- Neoseiulus pannuceus Beard, 2001
- Neoseiulus papenfussi (Schuster, 1966)
- Neoseiulus paraibensis (Moraes & McMurtry, 1983)
- Neoseiulus paraki (Ehara, 1967)
- Neoseiulus paramarinus Evans, 1988
- Neoseiulus parvipilis (Athias-Henriot, 1978)
- Neoseiulus paspalivorus (De Leon, 1957)
- Neoseiulus pegasus (Schuster, 1966)
- Neoseiulus perfectus (Chaudhri, 1968)
- Neoseiulus perspectus (Kolodochka, 1992)
- Neoseiulus peruanas (El-Banhawy, 1979)
- Neoseiulus phragmitidis (Bozai, 1997)
- Neoseiulus picanus (Ragusa, 2000)
- Neoseiulus pieteri (Schultz, 1972)
- Neoseiulus placitus (Khan & Chaudhri, 1969)
- Neoseiulus planatus (Muma, 1962)
- Neoseiulus plantagenis (Kolodochka, 1981)
- Neoseiulus pluridentatus Lofego & Moraes, 2003
- Neoseiulus poculi (Karg, 1976)
- Neoseiulus populi (Bozai, 1997)
- Neoseiulus pristisimilis (Karg, 1993)
- Neoseiulus provectus (Kolodochka, 1991)
- Neoseiulus pseudaequipilus (Wainstein & Abbasova, 1974)
- Neoseiulus pseudoherbarius Meshkov, 1994
- Neoseiulus pseudoumbraticus (Chant & Yoshida-Shaul, 1982)
- Neoseiulus pulupotus (Schicha & Corpuz-Raros, 1992)
- Neoseiulus quaesitus (Wainstein & Beglyarov, 1971)
- Neoseiulus queenslandensis (McMurtry & Schicha, 1987)
- Neoseiulus rambami (Swirski & Amitai, 1990)
- Neoseiulus rancidus (Chaudhri, Akbar & Rasool, 1979)
- Neoseiulus rarosi (Schicha & Corpuz-Raros, 1992)
- Neoseiulus recifensis Gondim Jr. & Moraes, 2001
- Neoseiulus reductus (Wainstein, 1962)
- Neoseiulus reticulatus (Oudemans, 1930)
- Neoseiulus reticuloides (Wainstein, 1975)
- Neoseiulus ribes Denmark & Edland, 2002
- Neoseiulus rimandoi (Schicha & Corpuz-Raros, 1992)
- Neoseiulus rufus Denmark & Evans, in Denmark, Evans, Aguilar, Vargas & Ochoa 1999
- Neoseiulus salicicola (Bozai, 1997)
- Neoseiulus salish (Chant & Hansell, 1971)
- Neoseiulus saudiensis Negm, Alatawi & Aldryhim, 2012
- Neoseiulus scapilatus (van der Merwe, 1965)
- Neoseiulus scoticus (Collyer, 1957)
- Neoseiulus segnis (Wainstein & Arutunjan, 1970)
- Neoseiulus sehlabati (El-Banhawy, 2002)
- Neoseiulus septentrionalis (Karg, 1977)
- Neoseiulus setulus (Fox, 1947)
- Neoseiulus shambati (El-Badry, 1968)
- Neoseiulus shanksi Congdon, 2002
- Neoseiulus sharonensis (Rivnay & Swirski, 1980)
- Neoseiulus shiheziensis (Wu & Li, 1987)
- Neoseiulus simplexus (Denmark & Knisley, 1978)
- Neoseiulus sinaiticum (Amitai & Swirski, 1982)
- Neoseiulus sioux (Chant & Hansell, 1971)
- Neoseiulus sospesitis (Khan & Chaudhri, 1969)
- Neoseiulus sparaktes Beard, 2001
- Neoseiulus specus Beard, 2001
- Neoseiulus spicatus Denmark & Evans, in Denmark, Evans, Aguilar, Vargas & Ochoa 1999
- Neoseiulus spineus (Tseng, 1976)
- Neoseiulus sporobolus Tuttle & Muma, 1973
- Neoseiulus steinerae Beard, 2001
- Neoseiulus stolidus (Chaudhri, 1968)
- Neoseiulus striatus (Wu, 1983)
- Neoseiulus subreticulatus (Wu, 1987)
- Neoseiulus subrotundus (Wu & Lan, 1991)
- Neoseiulus subsolidus (Beglyarov, 1960)
- Neoseiulus sugonjaevi (Wainstein & Abbasova, 1974)
- Neoseiulus suknaensis (Gupta, 1970)
- Neoseiulus swartii Zack, 1969
- Neoseiulus tabis (Schuster & Pritchard, 1963)
- Neoseiulus tabularis Chaudhri, Akbar & Rasool, 1979
- Neoseiulus taiwanicus (Ehara, 1970)
- Neoseiulus tareensis (Schicha, 1983)
- Neoseiulus tauricus (Livshitz & Kuznetsov, 1972)
- Neoseiulus teke (Pritchard & Baker, 1962)
- Neoseiulus tenuisetae (Karg, 1993)
- Neoseiulus tervus Meshkov, 1994
- Neoseiulus thwaitei (Schicha, 1977)
- Neoseiulus tibielingmiut (Chant & Hansell, 1971)
- Neoseiulus tobon (Chant & Hansell, 1971)
- Neoseiulus tornadus (Tuttle & Muma, 1973)
- Neoseiulus transversus Denmark & Muma, 1973
- Neoseiulus triangularis (Karg, 1994)
- Neoseiulus tshernovi (Kuznetsov, 1984)
- Neoseiulus tunus (De Leon, 1967)
- Neoseiulus turangae (Kolodochka, 1982)
- Neoseiulus tuvinensis (Beglyarov & Meshkov, 1988)
- Neoseiulus tyrrelli (Chant & Hansell, 1971)
- Neoseiulus ulatei Denmark & Evans, in Denmark, Evans, Aguilar, Vargas & Ochoa 1999
- Neoseiulus uliginosus (Karg, 1976)
- Neoseiulus umbraticus (Chant, 1956)
- Neoseiulus umsteadi (Muma, Metz & Farrier, 1967)
- Neoseiulus vallis (Schuster & Pritchard, 1963)
- Neoseiulus vanderlindei (van der Merwe, 1965)
- Neoseiulus vardgesi (Arutunjan, 1968)
- Neoseiulus vasoides (Karg, 1989)
- Neoseiulus vehementis (Khan & Chaudhri, 1969)
- Neoseiulus veigai Gondim Jr. & Moraes, 2001
- Neoseiulus venustus (Chaudhri, 1968)
- Neoseiulus versutus (Beglyarov, 1981)
- Neoseiulus wanrooyae Beard, 2001
- Neoseiulus warrum Beard, 2001
- Neoseiulus wearnei (Schicha, 1987)
- Neoseiulus womersleyi (Schicha, 1975)
- Neoseiulus xizangensis (Zhu & Chen, 1985)
- Neoseiulus yanoi (Ehara, 1972)
- Neoseiulus zwoelferi (Dosse, 1957)
