= Phytonemus =

Scientific classification
- Domain: Eukaryota
- Kingdom: Animalia
- Phylum: Arthropoda
- Subphylum: Chelicerata
- Class: Arachnida
- Order: Trombidiformes
- Family: Tarsonemidae
- Subfamily: Tarsoneminae
- Tribe: Steneotarsonemini
- Genus: Phytonemus; Lindquist, 1986
- Species: P. pallidus

Binomial name
- Phytonemus pallidus (Banks, 1899)

Genus of mites

Phytonemus is a monotypic genus of mites belonging to the family Tarsonemidae. The only species is Phytonemus pallidus.

The species is found in Northern America and Europe.
