= British Beekeepers Association =

Charitable organization in Warwickshire, United Kingdom

- Abbreviation: BBKA
- Formation: 16 May 1874
- Founder: Thomas William Cowan; Charles Nash Abbott
- Registration no.: Charity No: 1185343
- Legal status: Charitable organisation
- Purpose: To further and promote the craft of beekeeping
- Headquarters: The National Beekeeping Centre, National Agricultural Centre, Stoneleigh Park, Warwickshire, CV8 2LG
- Region served: United Kingdom
- Members: 26,555 (2018)
- President: Diane Drinkwater
- Chair: Clare McGettigan
- Vice Chair: Richard Oliver
- Key people: Worshipful Company of Wax Chandlers (Patron); Jimmy Doherty (Patron)
- Main organ: Board of Trustees
- Website: www.bbka.org.uk

The British Beekeepers Association (BBKA) is a charitable organisation registered in England and Wales that was founded in 1874, by Thomas William Cowan and Charles Nash Abbott. It held its first meeting on 16 May. It is made up of 75 associations in England & Wales plus one in Northern Ireland, Isle of Man and Jersey. At end of 2018 there were 26,555 members. Its patrons include the Worshipful Company of Wax Chandlers and Jimmy Doherty.

The BBKA is an independent charity with a membership formed of 75 associations and 170 branches. It acts as an umbrella group for them and co-ordinates a swarm collection service for the public, administers training for beekeepers including a new scheme to encourage more beekeepers to use locally raised queens, administers grants for researchers looking at aspects of bee health and welfare and has recently encouraged the setting up of Asian Hornet Awareness Teams.

== Charitable objectives ==
The BBKA's charitable objectives are:

- To further and promote the craft of beekeeping
- To advance the education of the public in the importance of bees in the environment

== Activities ==
Beekeeping associations and branches are local organisations of differing size, history and origins. They have a common interest in training people to be beekeepers and keeping the craft of beekeeping and understanding of honeybees alive. The majority of groups will maintain a training apiary and have a schedule of meetings in the summer and in the winter when beekeeping ceases.

The BBKA operates services for the public by means of a swarm map which directs the public to local beekeepers who can help with the removal of honeybees.

Along with the other national beekeeping associations in the UK and Ireland the BBKA promotes the education of beekeepers in the craft of beekeeping by offering courses and exams and a correspondence course for those unable to attend training sessions. UK schools are also embracing beekeeping.

In 1946 the BBKA established a committee to promote research activities. Every year, the BBKA makes funds available for University and PhD research into bee behaviour and health. This is administered by a panel who consider applications on a rolling basis throughout the year. Following the discovery of the first Asian Hornets on the UK mainland in 2018 the BBKA has encouraged the setting up of an Asian Hornet Action Team in every area.

The BBKA also offers a Bee Friendly Holiday Park benchmark scheme operated by the David Bellamy Conservation Award Scheme (DBCAS) which looks at the forage plants they provide for bees, what they do to provide homes for bees and how they promote bee conservation.

In 2010 the BBKA worked with the UK Government and the National Diploma of Beekeeping Board to train 400 experts in bee husbandry. This was funded by DEFRA as part of their Healthy Bees Plan. Two years previously the BBKA had submitted a Beekeeping Research paper to Lord Rooker of DEFRA. The NDB and the BBKA also introduced courses to raise local queens under the Healthy Bees Plan. The BBKA along with the other national beekeeping groups takes part in the Government's Bee Health Advisory Forum to contribute towards policies to respond to threats faced by bees.

The monthly membership magazine published by the BBKA is BBKA News.

The BBKA is not a direct member of Apimondia. Its interest is represented instead via its membership of the Council of National Beekeeping Associations of the United Kingdom and Ireland (CONBA).

The BBKA has celebrated the first National Honey Day, 21 October, Anne Rowberry, President of the BBKA, gave the King a jar of honey to celebrate National Honey Day
