= Apimondia =

Beekeeping organization

- Formation: 1895
- Headquarters: International Federation of Beekeepers' Associations Corso Vittorio Emanuele 101 I-00186 Rome, Italy
- Acting President: Peter Kozmus
- Website: https://www.apimondia.org/

Apimondia or International Federation of Beekeepers' Associations promotes scientific, ecological, social and economic apicultural development in all countries and the cooperation of beekeepers` associations, scientific bodies and of individuals involved in apiculture worldwide. The name Apimondia is a compound word made from two words; api, referring to honey bees, and mondia, referring to the world.

The federation issues a journal, Apiacta. The 2003 and 2004 issues are available online free of charge.

Since 1897, every other year Apimondia organizes beekeepers' congresses, hosted by different countries.

Apimondia maintains seven scientific commissions and five regional commissions for the purposes of furthering scientific understanding of apiculture and to facilitate exchange of information.

The scientific commissions include:

- Beekeeping Economy
- Bee Health
- Bee Biology
- Pollination and Bee Flora
- Beekeeping Technology and Quality
- Apitherapy
- Beekeeping for Rural Development

== List of congresses ==
No.	Year	Place	Country
I	1897	Brussels	Belgium
II	1900	Paris	France
III	1902	's-Hertogenbosch	Netherlands
IV	1910	Brussels	Belgium
V	1911	Turin	Italy
VI	1922	Marseille	France
VII	1924	Quebec City	Canada
VIII	1928	Turin	Italy
IX	1932	Paris	France
X	1935	Brussels	Belgium
XI	1937	Paris	France
XII	1939	Zurich	Switzerland
XIII	1949	Amsterdam	Netherlands
XIV	1951	Leamington Spa	United Kingdom
XV	1954	Copenhagen	Denmark
XVI	1956	Vienna	Austria
XVII	1958	Rome	Italy
XVIII	1961	Madrid	Spain
XIX	1963	Prague	Czechoslovakia
XX	1965	Bucharest	Romania
XXI	1967	Maryland	United States
XXII	1969	Munich	West Germany
XXIII	1971	Moscow	Soviet Union
XXIV	1973	Buenos Aires	Argentina
XXV	1975	Grenoble	France
XXVI	1977	Adelaide	Australia
XXVII	1979	Athens	Greece
XXVIII	1981	Acapulco	Mexico
XXIX	1983	Budapest	Hungary
XXX	1985	Nagoya	Japan
XXXI	1987	Warsaw	Poland
XXXII	1989	Rio de Janeiro	Brazil
~~XXXIII~~ (canceled)	~~1991~~	Split	Yugoslavia
XXXIII	1993	Beijing	China
XXXIV	1995	Lausanne	Switzerland
XXXV	1997	Antwerp	Belgium
XXXVI	1999	Vancouver	Canada
XXXVII	2001	Durban	South Africa
XXXVIII	2003	Ljubljana	Slovenia
XXXIX	2005	Dublin	Ireland
XL	2007	Melbourne	Australia
XLI	2009	Montpellier	France
XLII	2011	Buenos Aires	Argentina
XLIII	2013	Kyiv	Ukraine
XLIV	2015	Daejeon	South Korea
XLV	2017	Istanbul	Turkey
XLVI	2019	Montreal	Canada
XLVII	2022	Istanbul	Turkey
XLVIII	2023	Santiago	Chile
XLIX	2025	Copenhagen	Denmark
