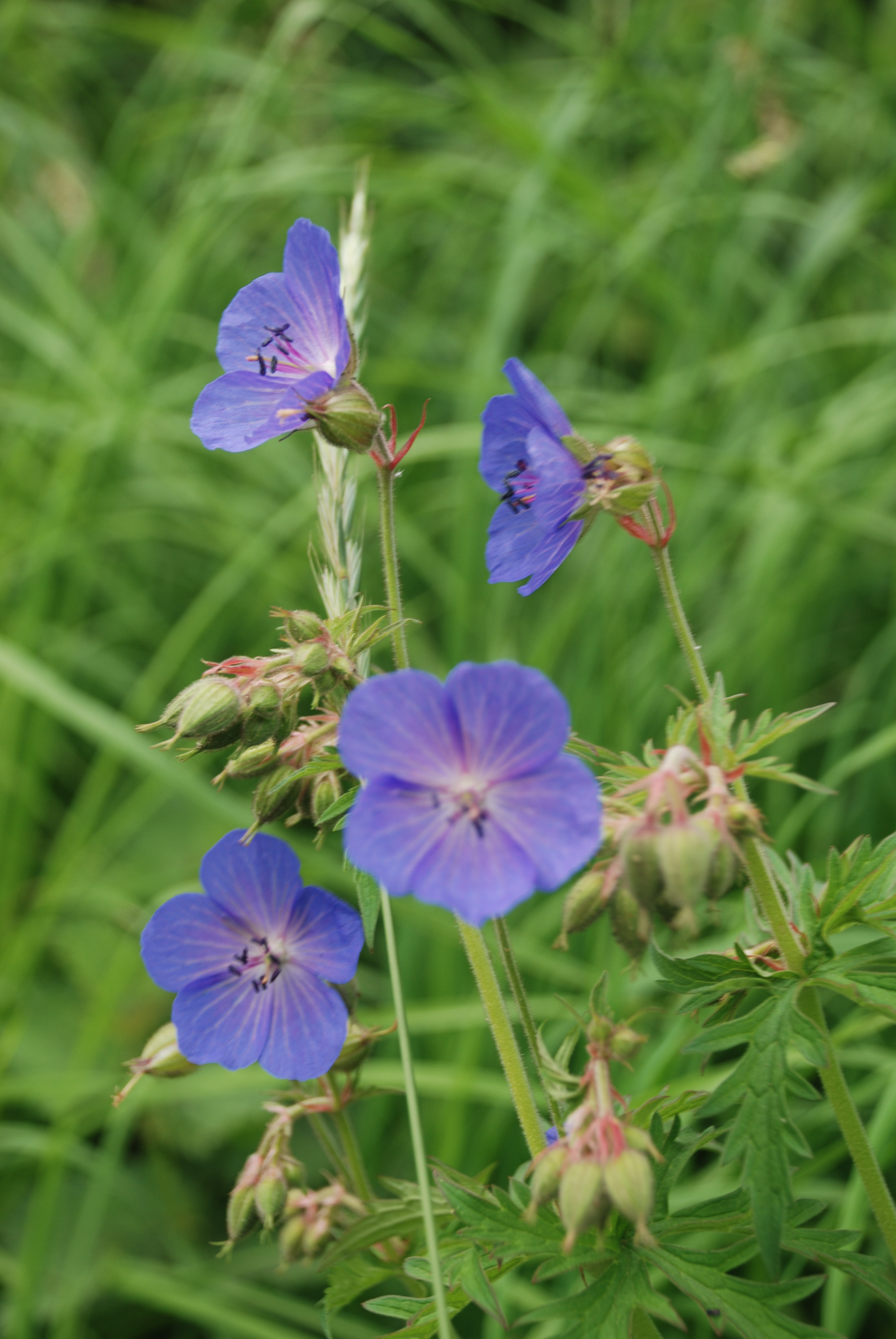

Scientific classification
- Kingdom: Plantae
- Clade: Tracheophytes
- Clade: Angiosperms
- Clade: Eudicots
- Clade: Rosids
- Order: Geraniales
- Family: Geraniaceae
- Genus: Geranium
- Species: G. pratense

Binomial name
- Geranium pratense L.

= Geranium pratense =

Species of flowering plant

Geranium pratense, the meadow crane's-bill or meadow geranium, is a species of flowering plant in the family Geraniaceae, native to Europe and Asia. Forming a clump up to 1 m (3.3 ft) broad, it is a herbaceous perennial with hairy stems and lax saucer-shaped blooms of pale violet. It is extremely hardy to at least −20 °C (−4 °F), reflecting its origins in the Altai Mountains of central Asia.

== Description ==
The leaves are deeply divided into 7-9 lobes and 3-6 inch wide and the flowers are pale blue, although getting paler into the centre. The flowers have 5 petals, which sometimes have veins. The stamens have pink-purple stalks with dark purple anthers.

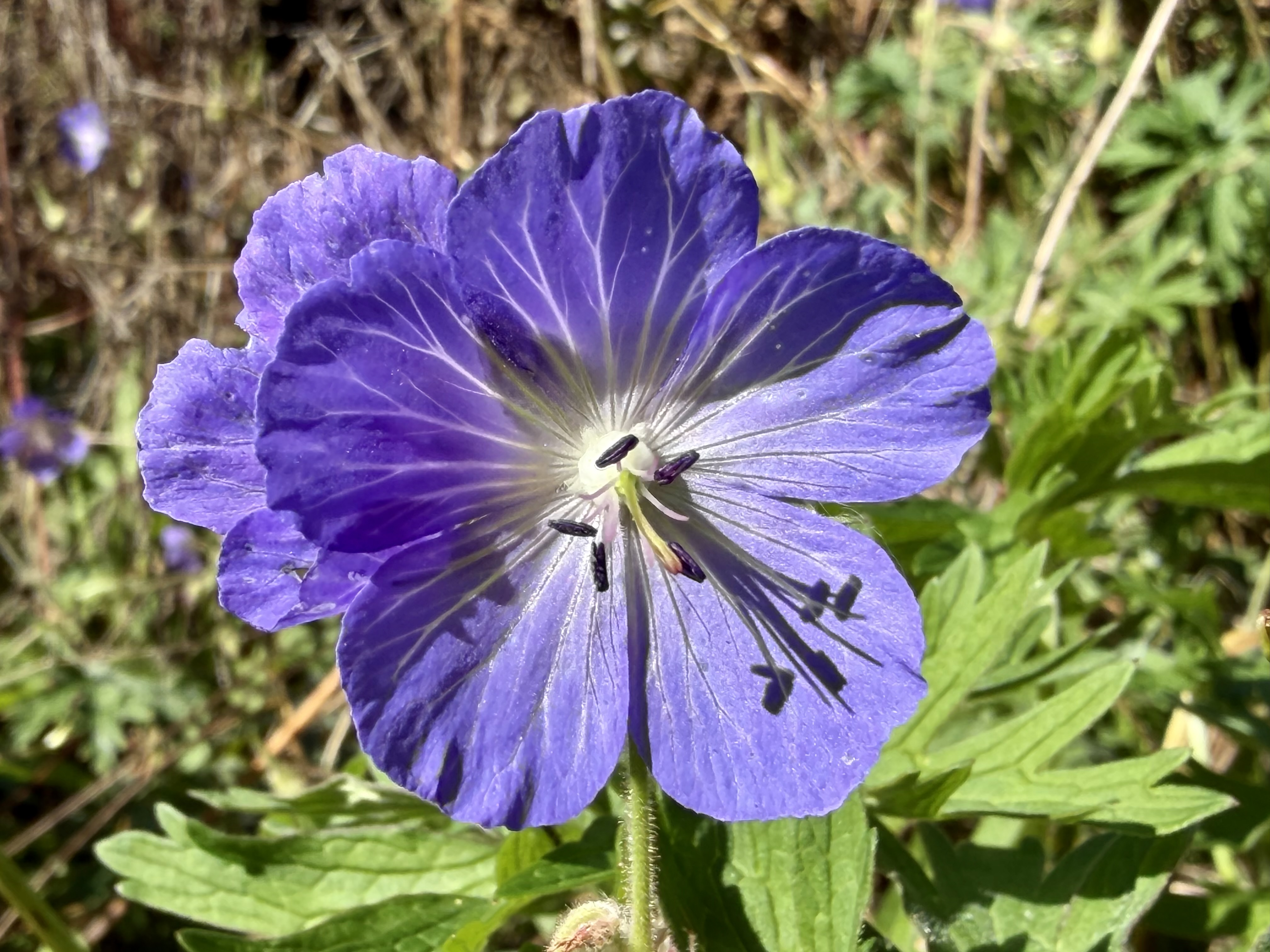
Flower

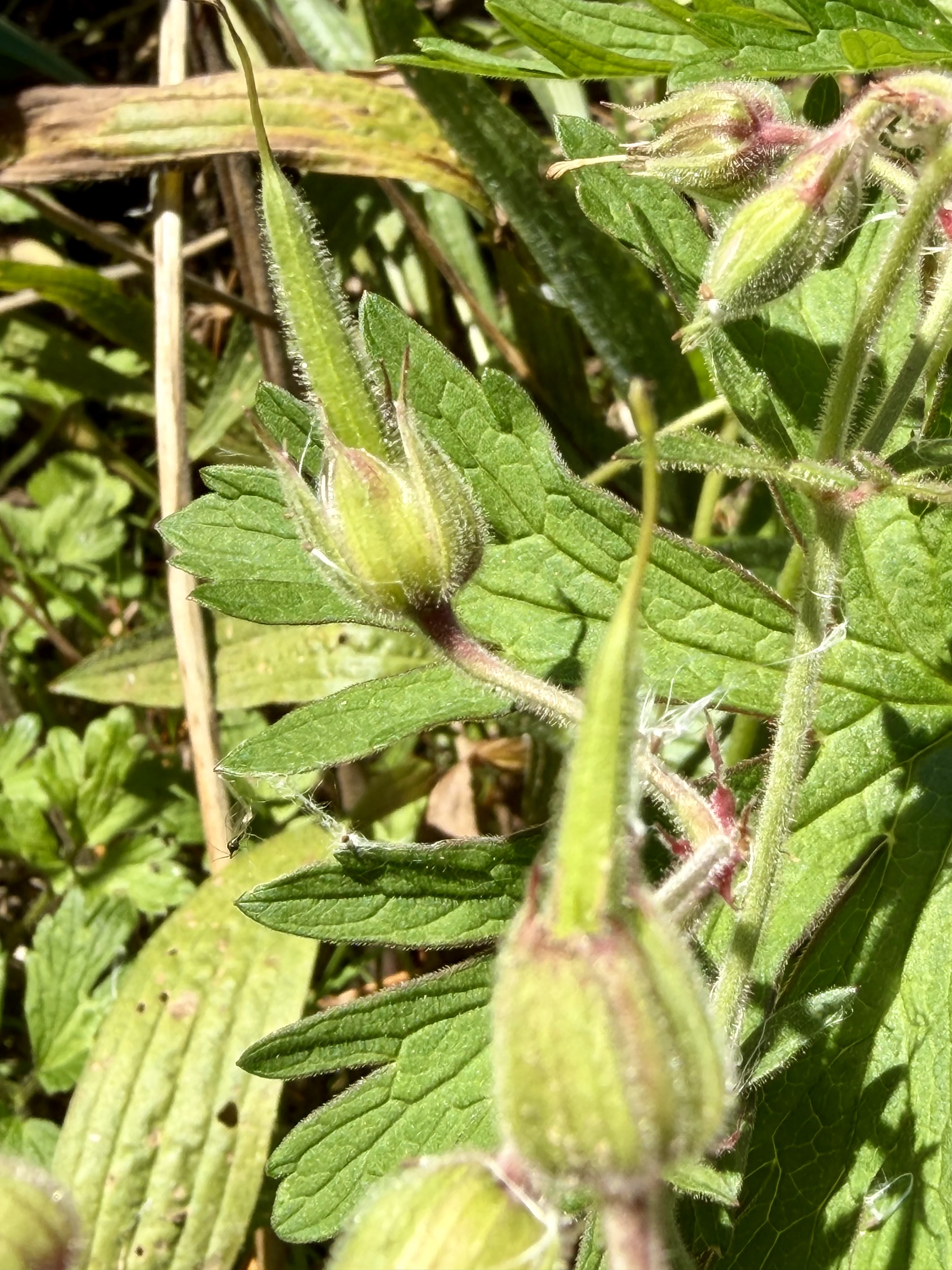
Buds

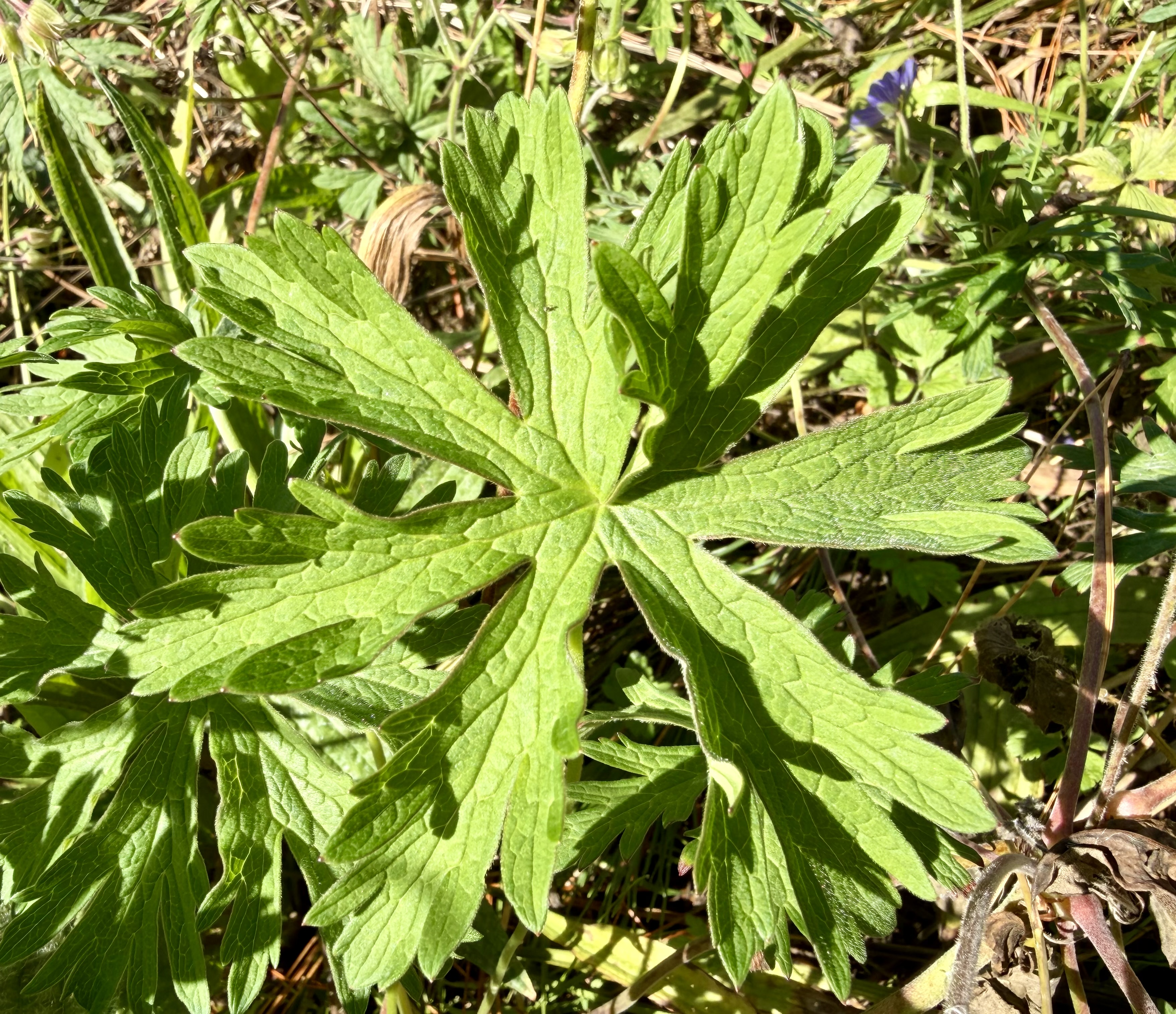
Leaf

== Cultivars ==
Several cultivars are available for garden use, of which 'Mrs Kendall Clark' and 'Plenum Violaceum' have gained the Royal Horticultural Society's Award of Garden Merit.

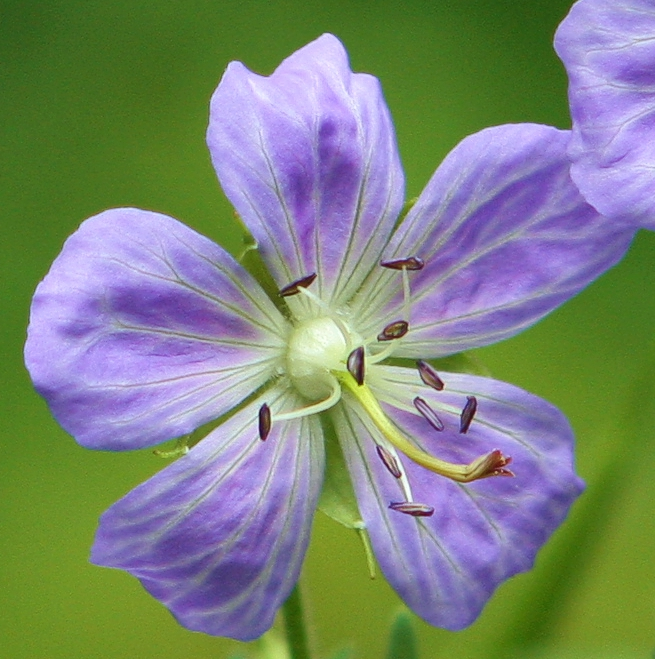
'Mrs Kendal Clark'

== Uses ==
Geranium pratense is a melliferous herb. Its nectar secretion is 1.3 – 1.5 mg/24 hrs. with a sugar content (sugar concentration) of 57 – 71 %.
