= Melliferous flower =

Plant harvested by bees to produce honey

A melliferous flower is a plant which produces substances that can be collected by insects and turned into honey. Many plants are melliferous, but only certain examples can be harvested by honey bees, because of their physiognomy (body size and shape, length of proboscis, etc.). Apiculture classifies a plant as melliferous if it can be harvested by domesticated honey bees.

The table below lists some of the known melliferous plants, and indicates the flowering period, as well as the resources harvested by bees (nectar, pollen, propolis, and honeydew). Each plant does not produce the same quantity or quality of these resources, and even among species the production can vary due to region, plant health, climate, etc.

== Plant table ==
=== Plains plants ===
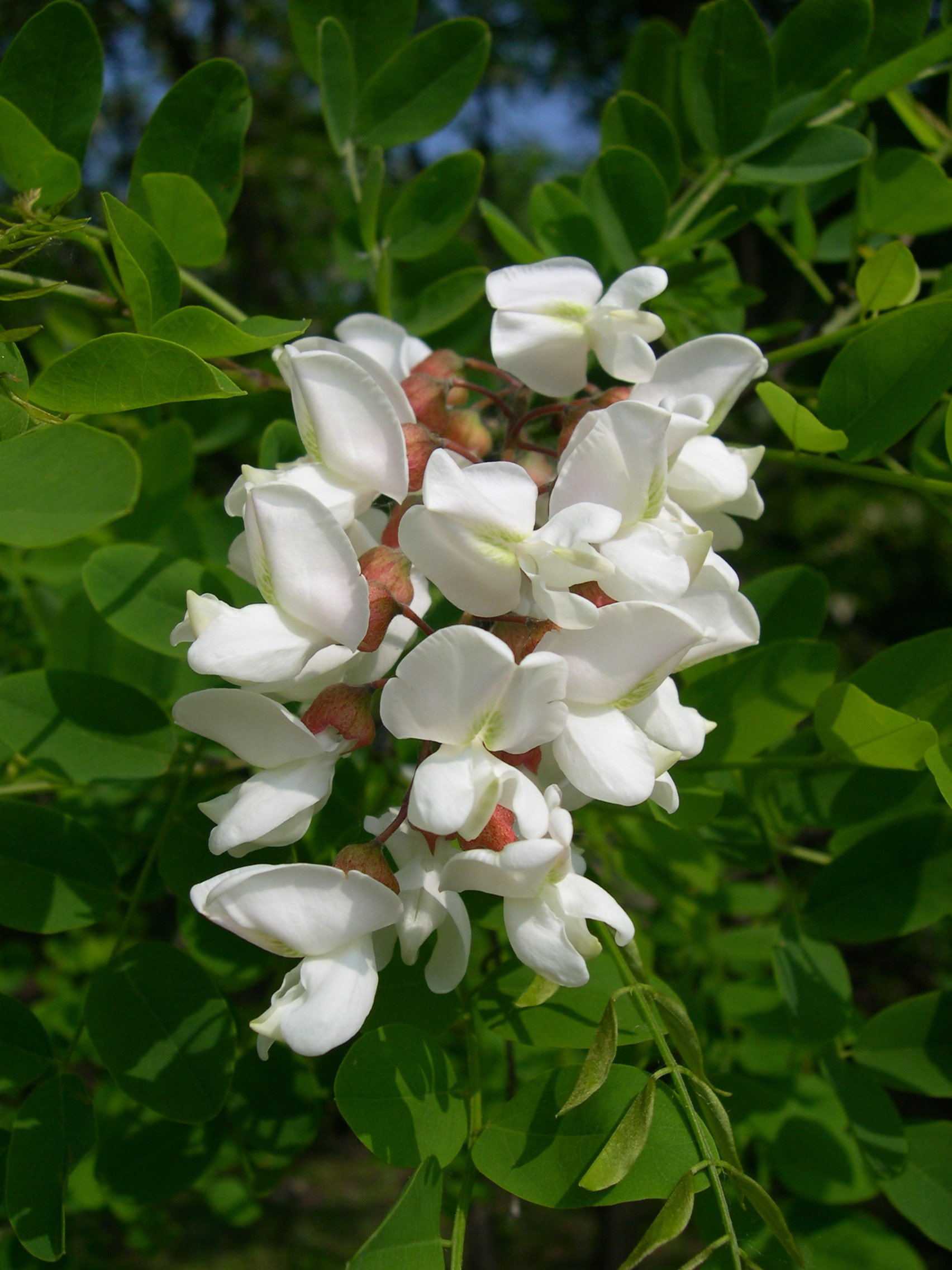
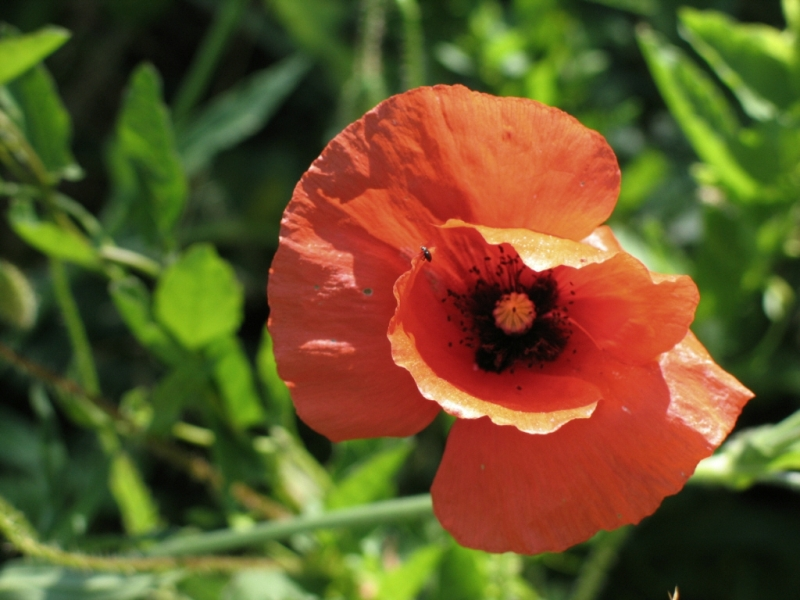
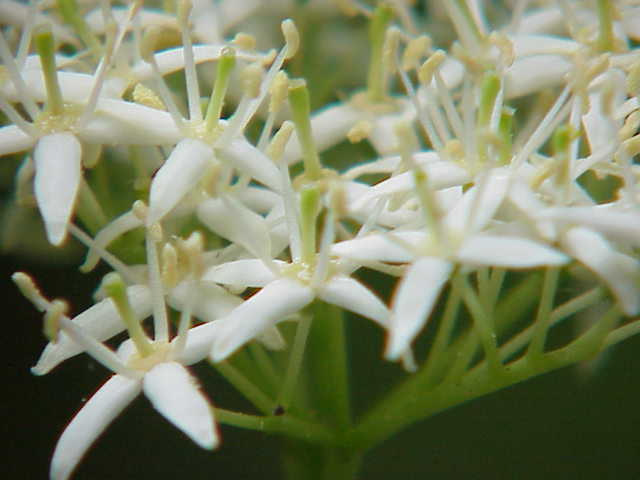
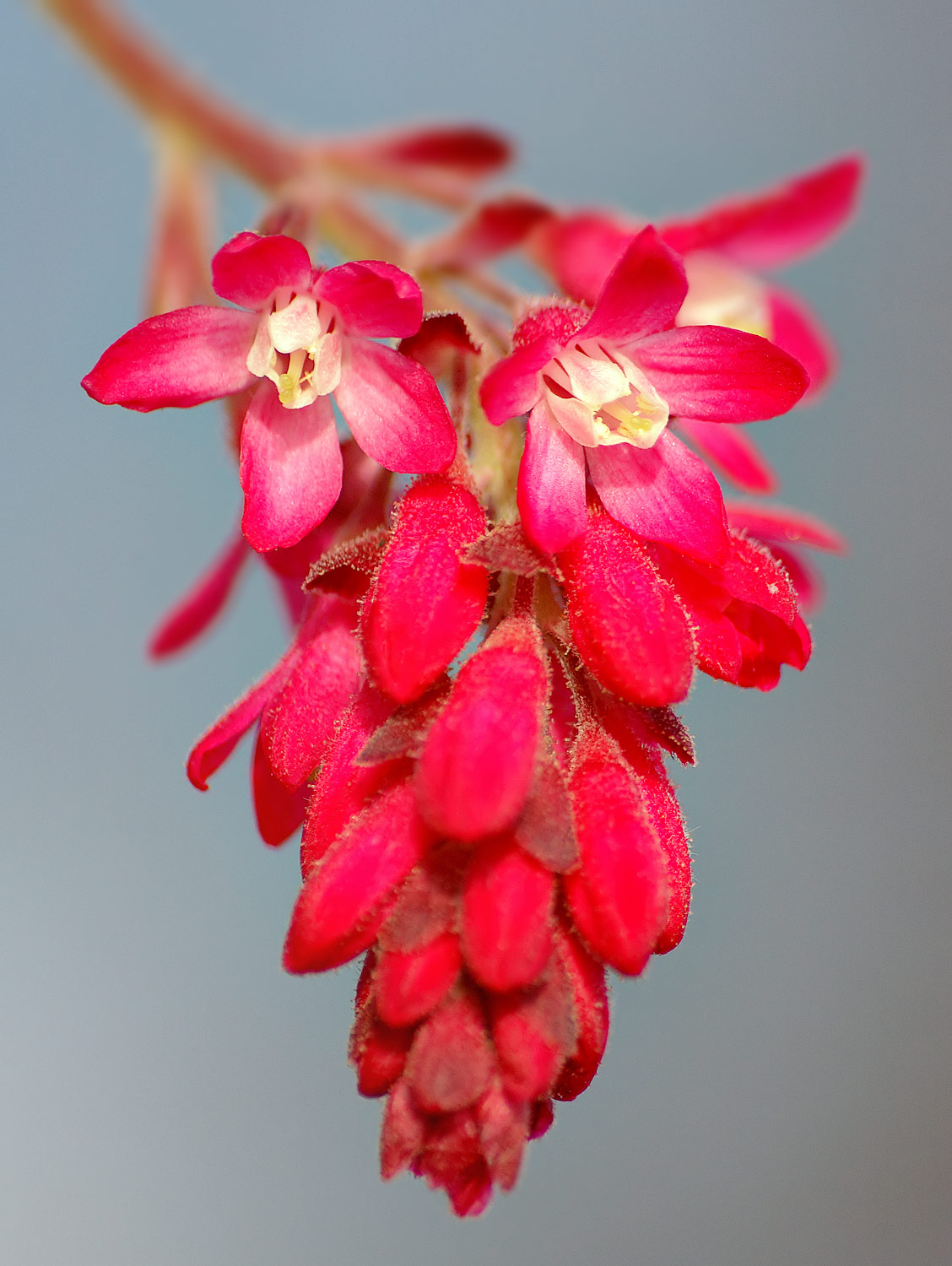
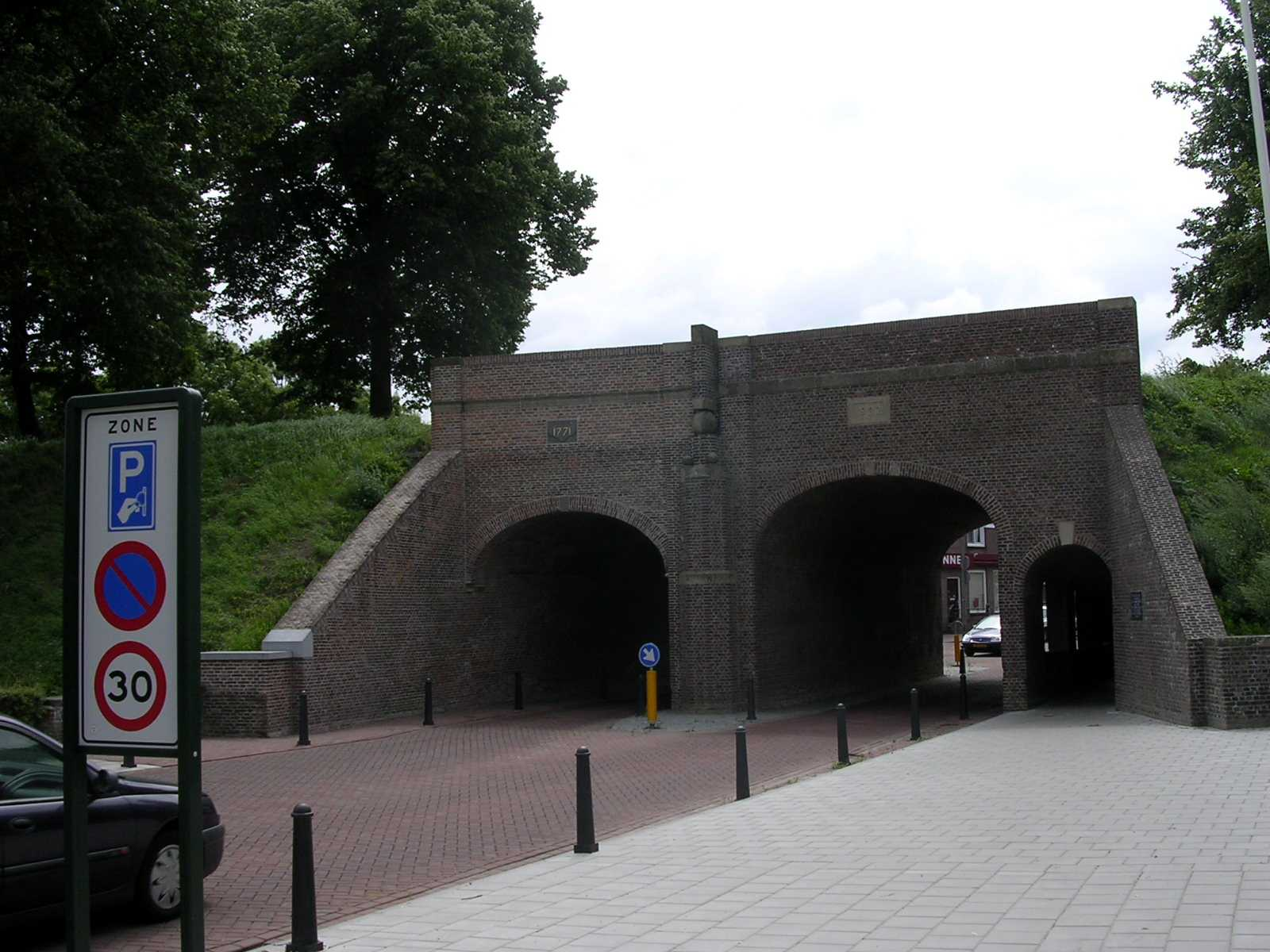
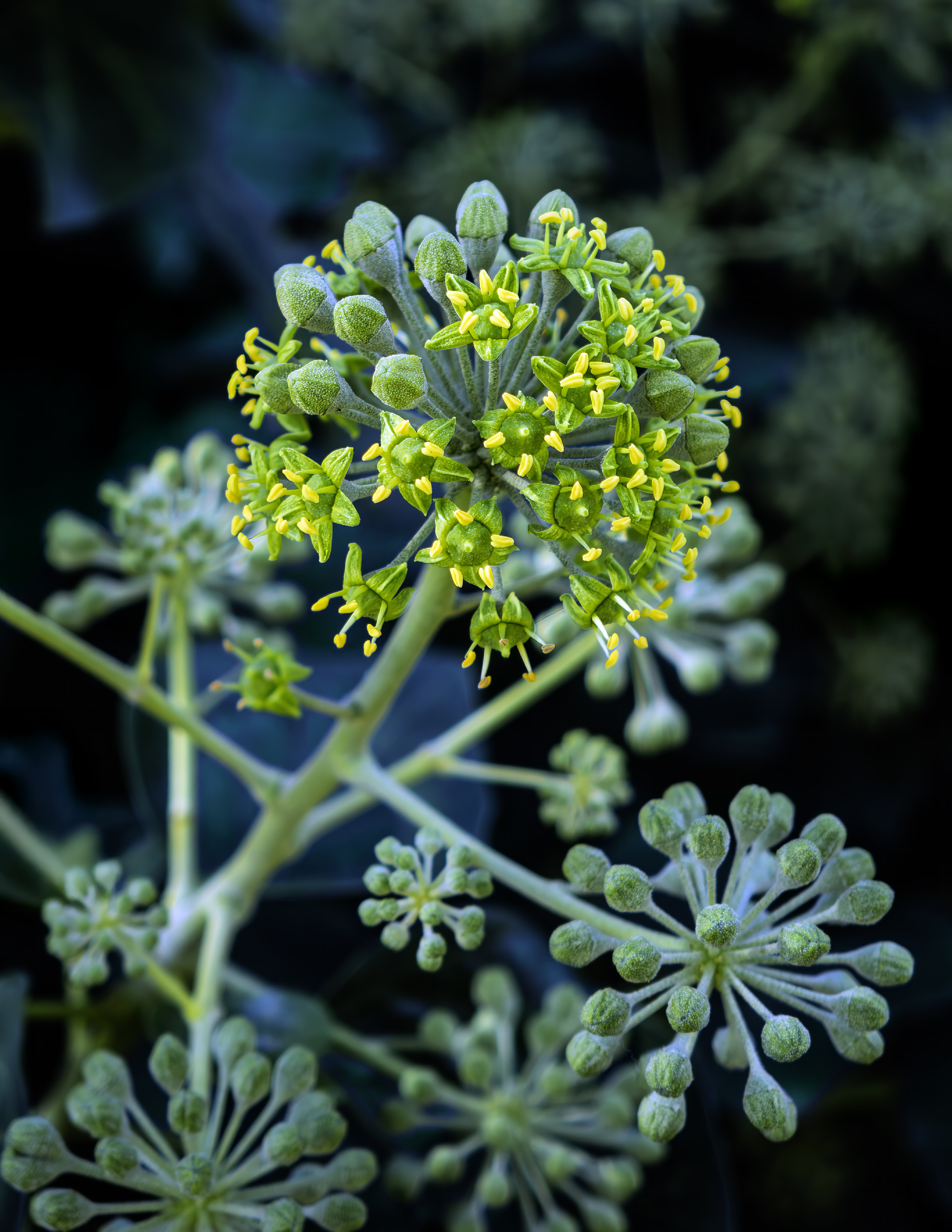
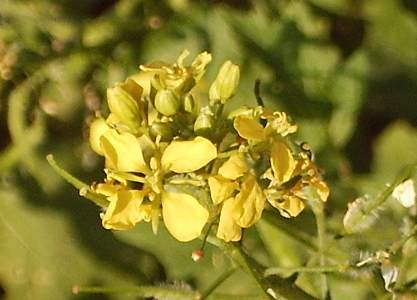
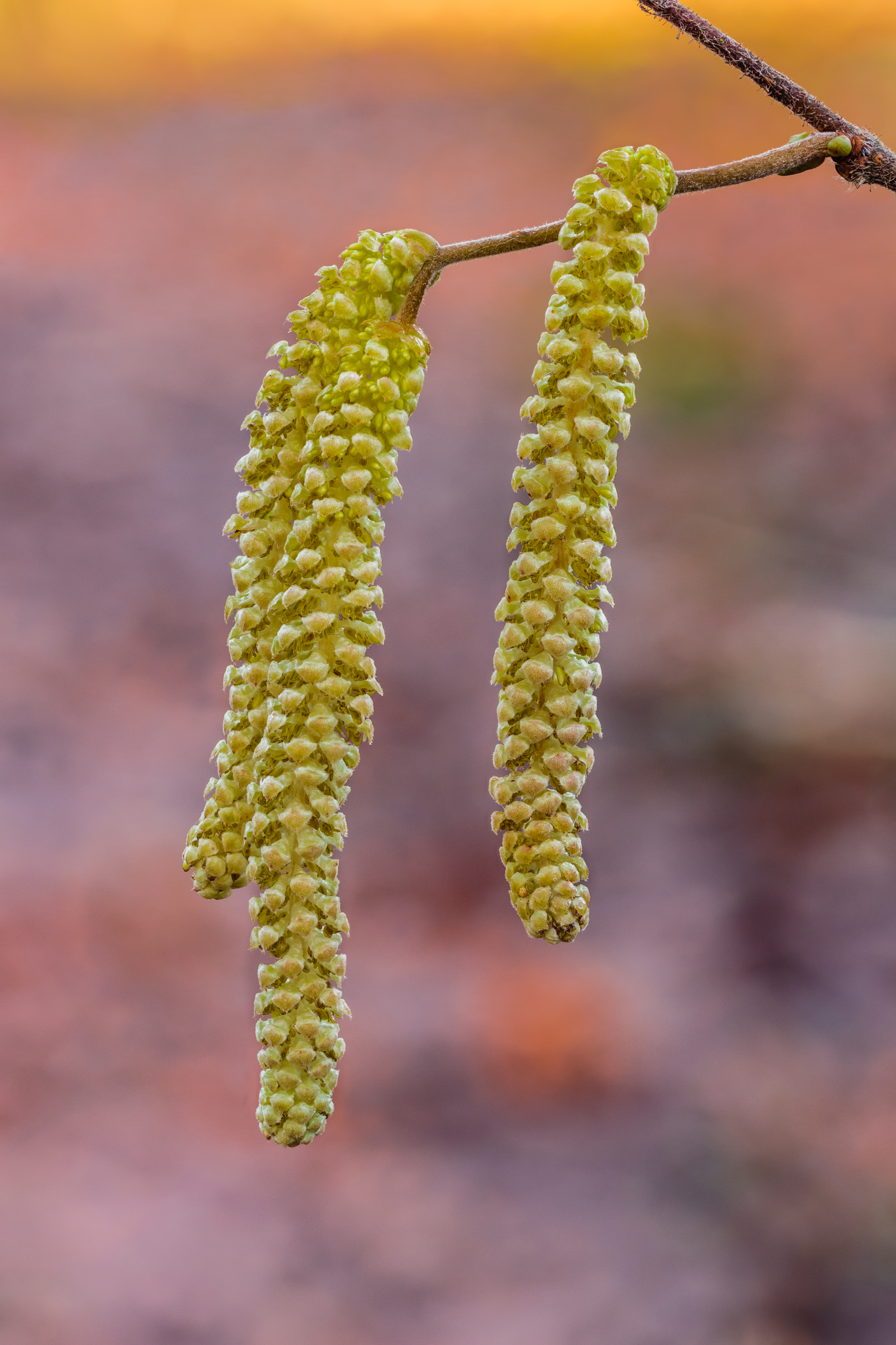
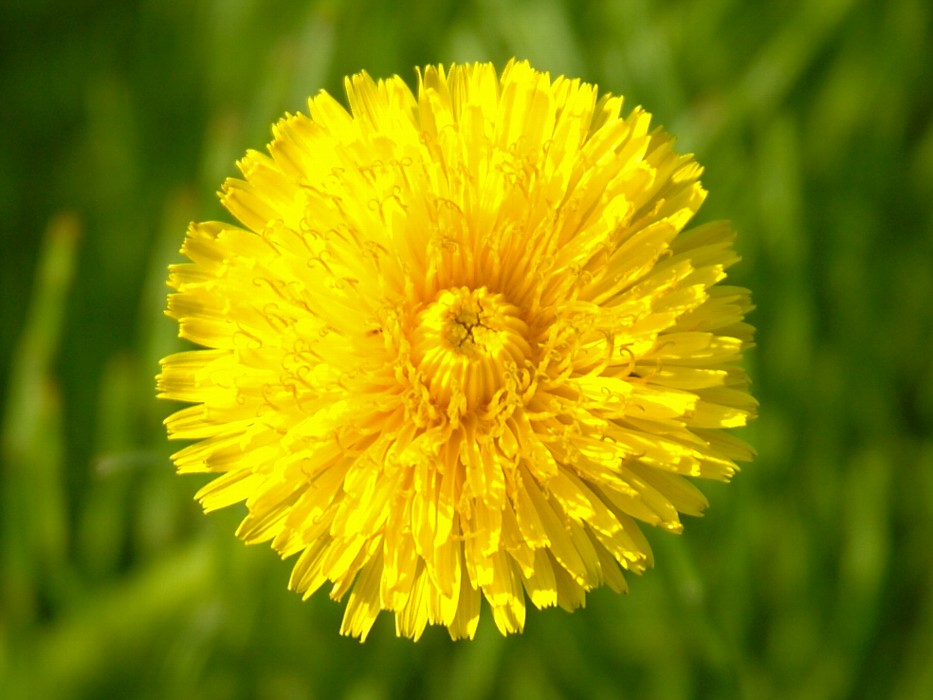
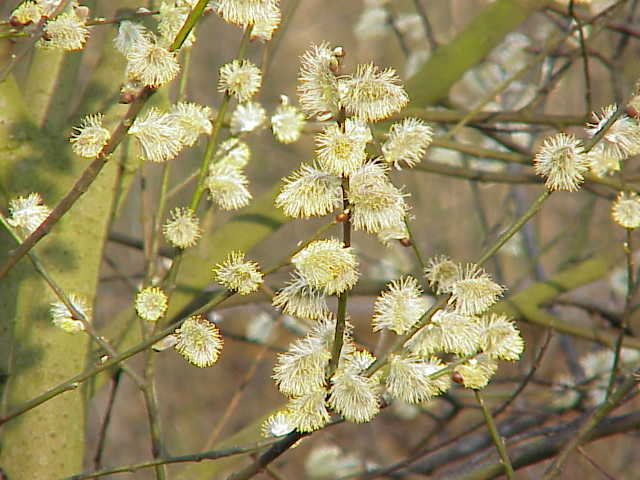
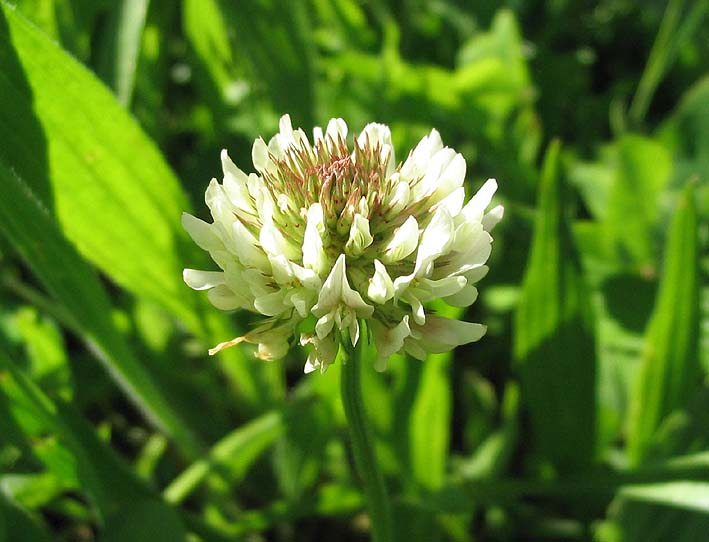
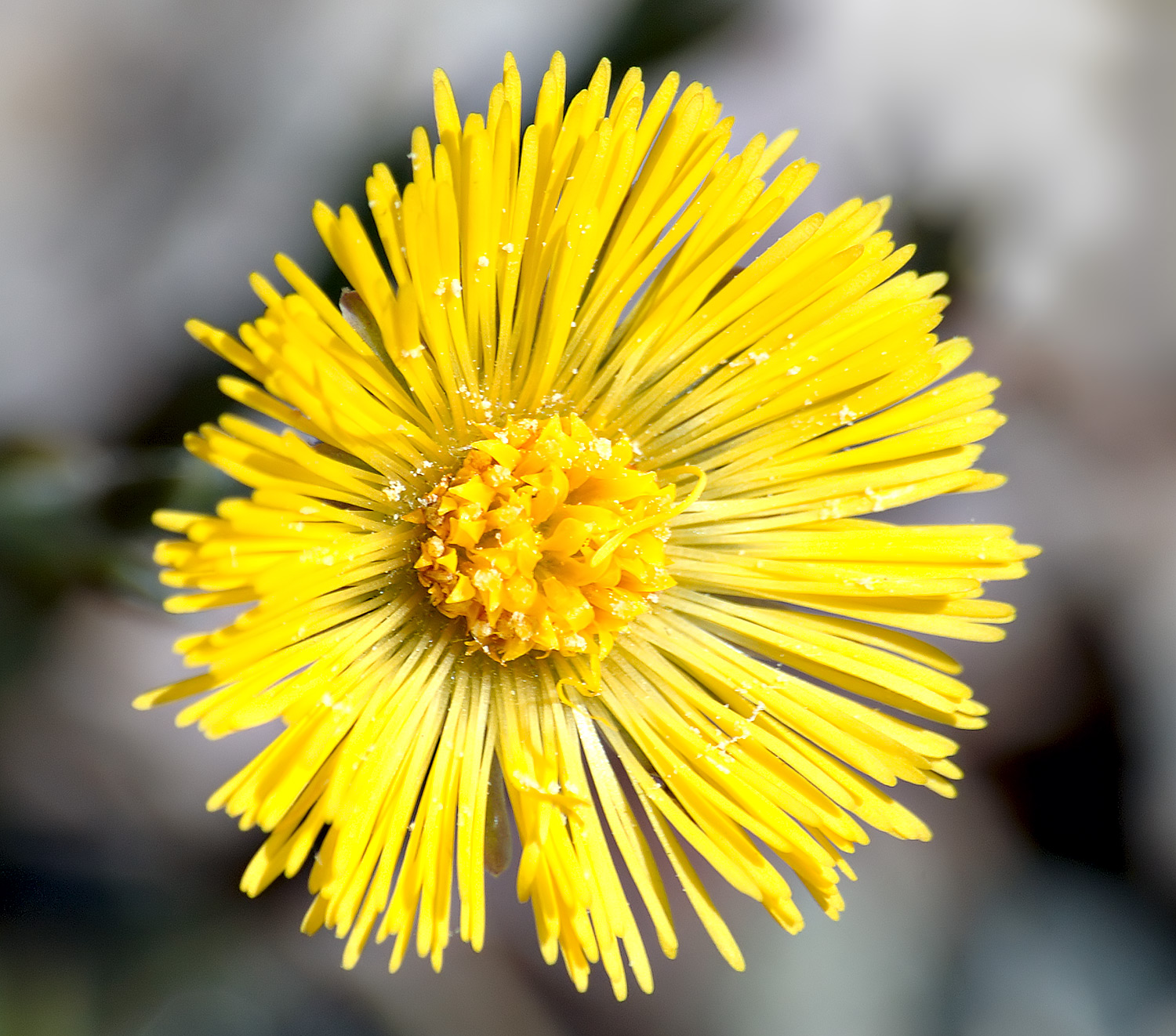
Image	Common name	Latin name	Flowering months	Nectar	Pollen	Propolis	Honeydew
	Black locust	Robinia pseudacacia	05–06	X	X	.	.
	Corn poppy	Papaver rhoeas	04–05	.	X	.	.
	Common dogwood	Cornus sanguinea	05–06	X	X	.	.
	Ribes	Ribes rubrum	04–05	X	X	.	.
	European holly	Ilex aquifolium	05–06	X	X	.	.
	European ivy	Hedera helix	09–10	X	X	X	.
	White mustard	Sinapis alba	05–09	X	X	.	.
	Hazel	Corylus avellana	01–03	.	X	.	X
	Dandelion	Taraxacum officinale	05–06	X	X	.	.
	Goat willow	Salix caprea	02–04	X	X	.	.
	White clover	Trifolium repens	05–07	X	X	.	.
	Coltsfoot	Tussilago farfara	02–04	.	X	.	.

=== Mediterranean plants ===
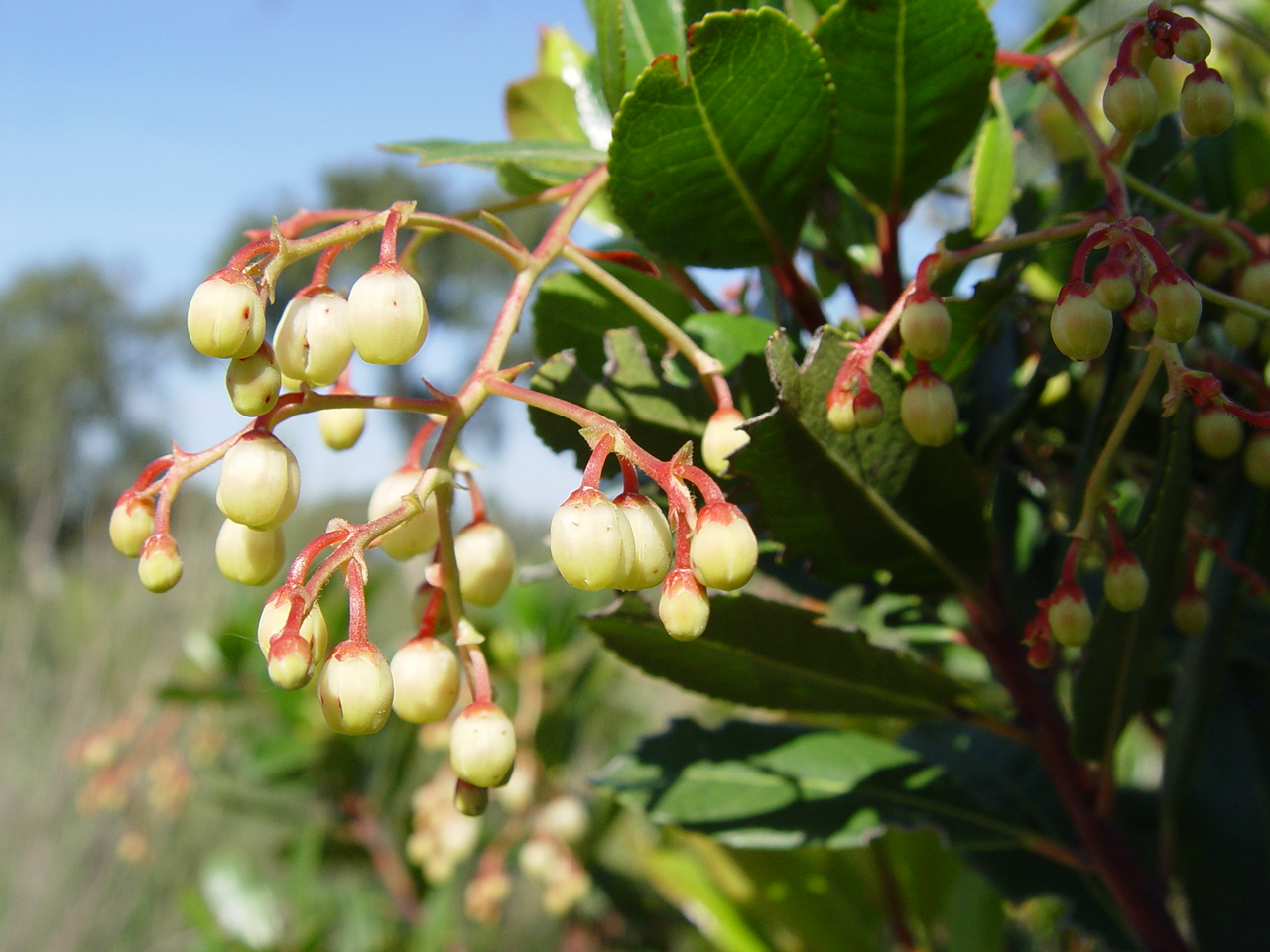
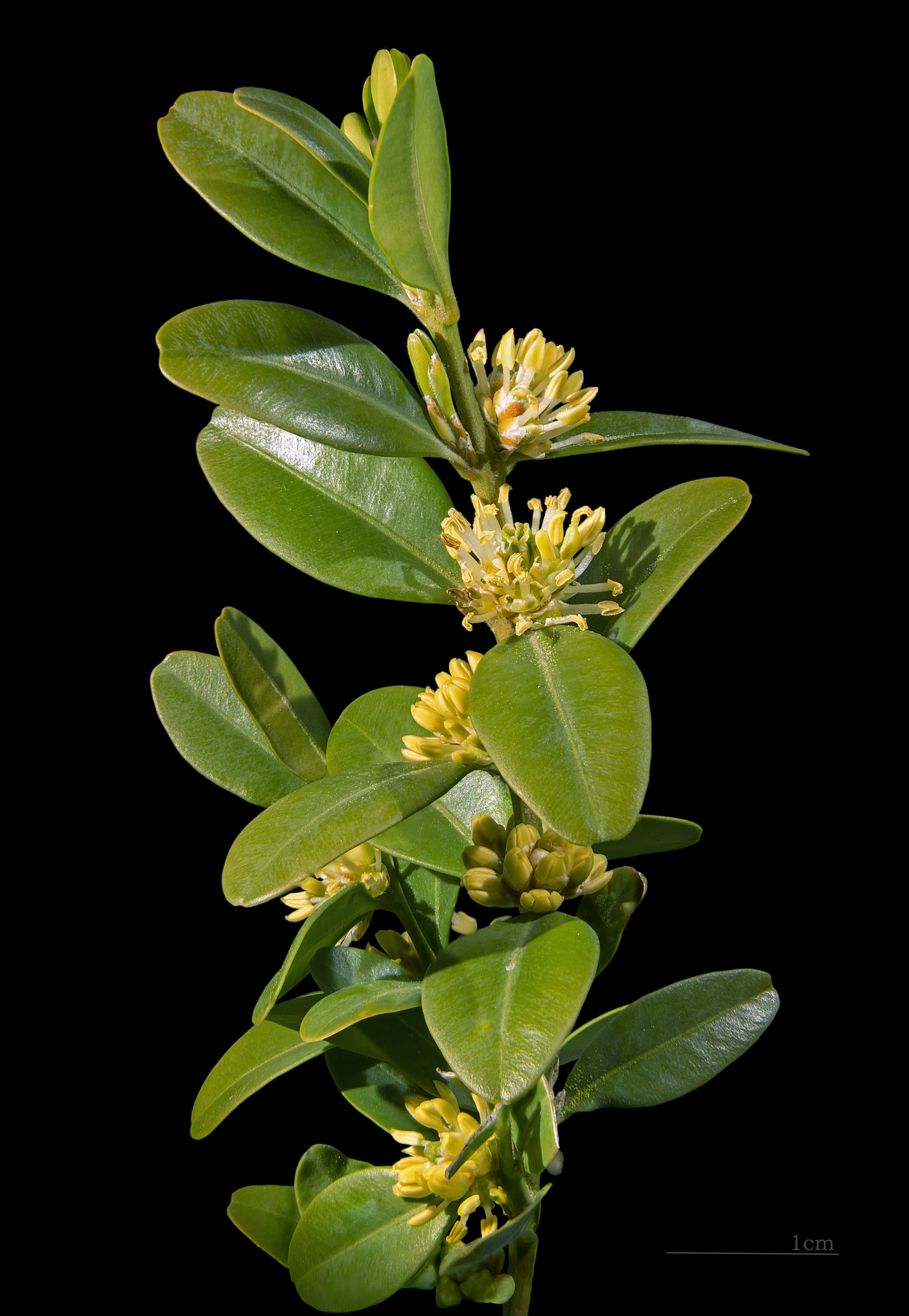
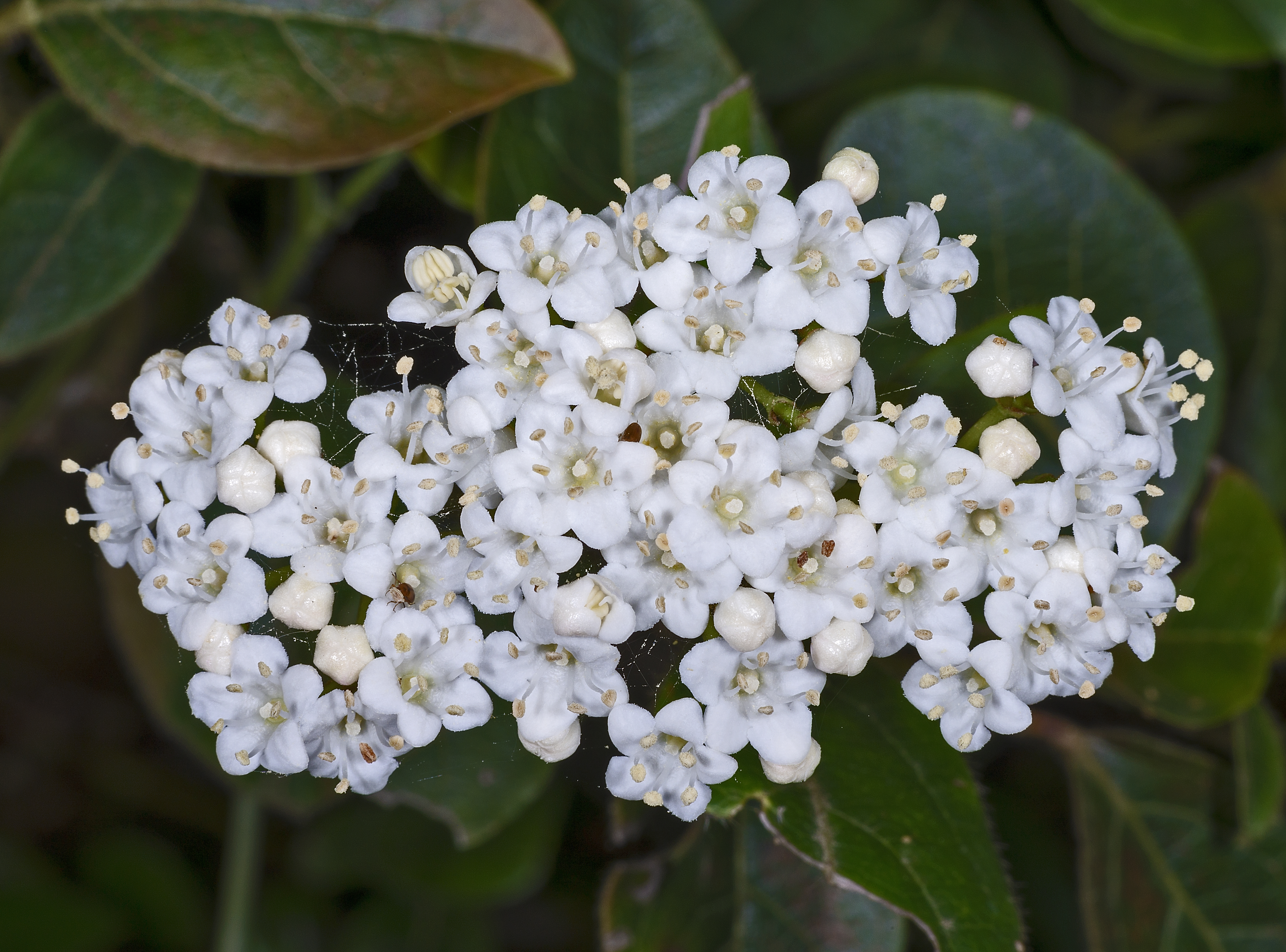
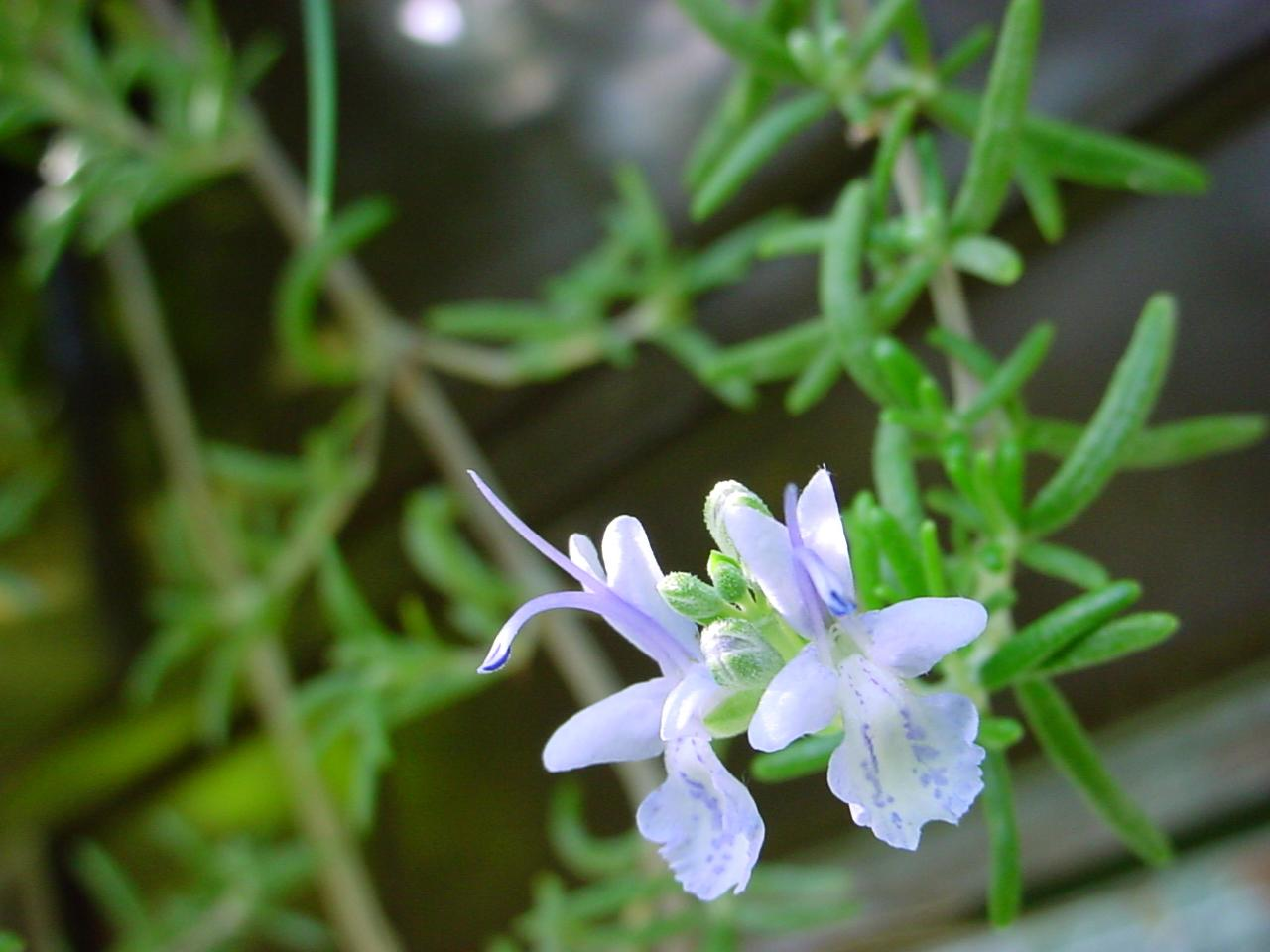
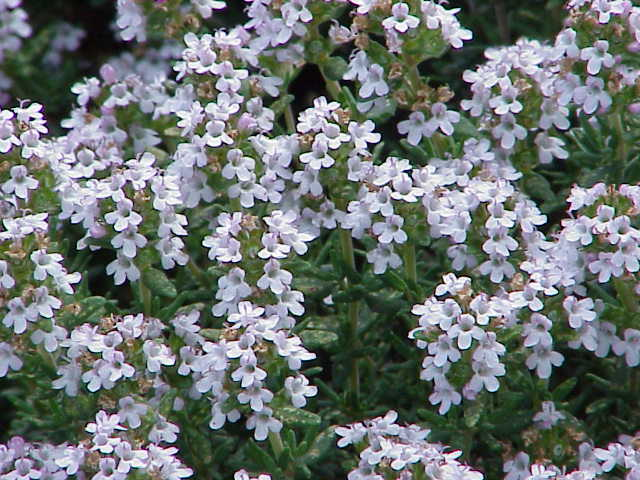
Image	Common name	Latin name	Flowering months	Nectar	Pollen	Propolis	Honeydew
	Almond	Prunus dulcis	02–04	X	X	.	.
	Strawberry tree	Arbutus unedo	10–01	X	.	.	.
	Buxus	Buxus sempervirens	04–05	X	X	.	.
	Viburnum tinus	Viburnum tinus	02–06	X	X	.	.
	Rosemary	Rosmarinus officinalis	11–04	X	X	.	.
	Thyme	Thymus vulgaris	04–09	X	.	.	.

=== Mountain plants ===
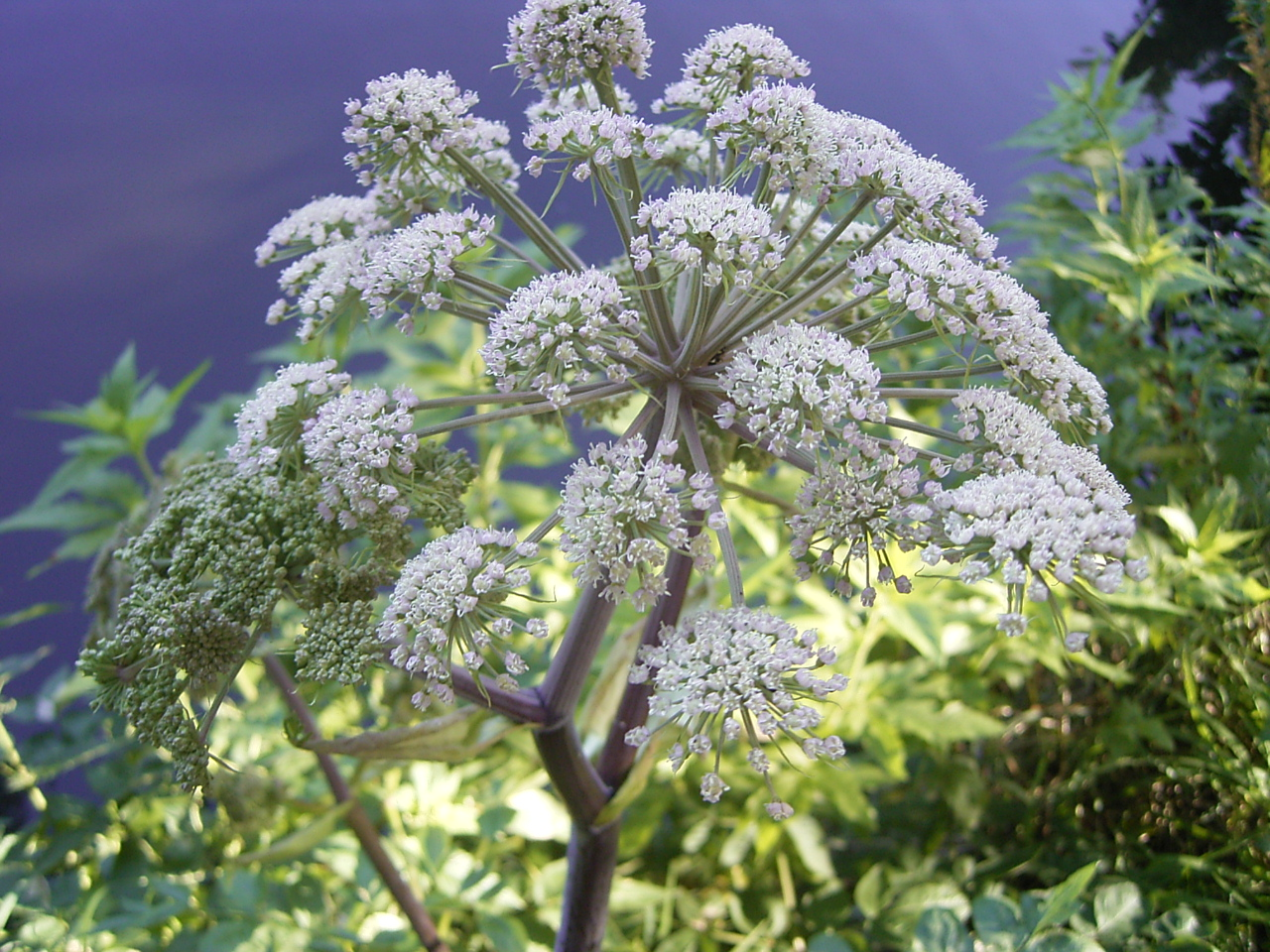
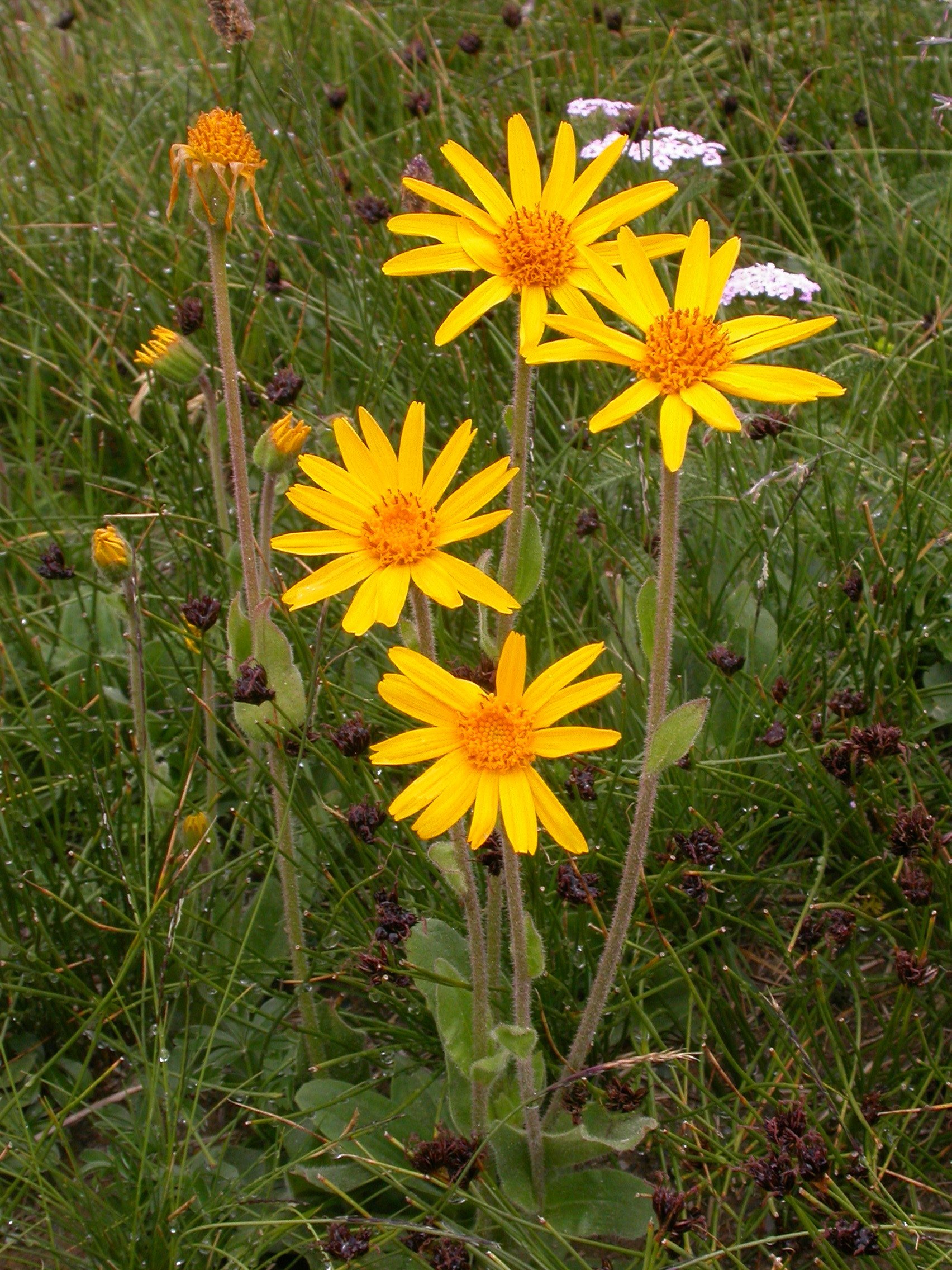
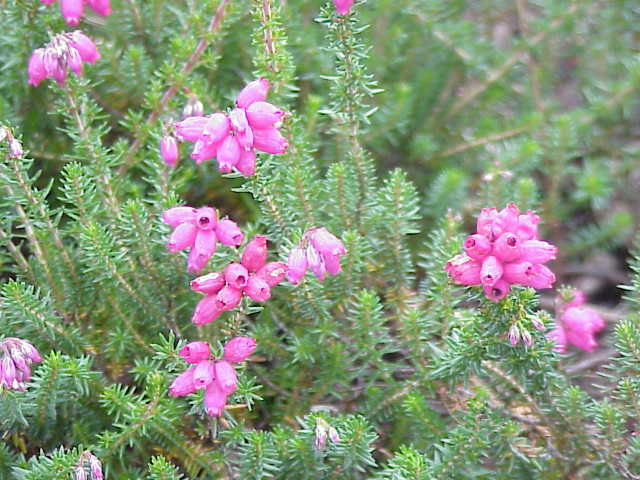
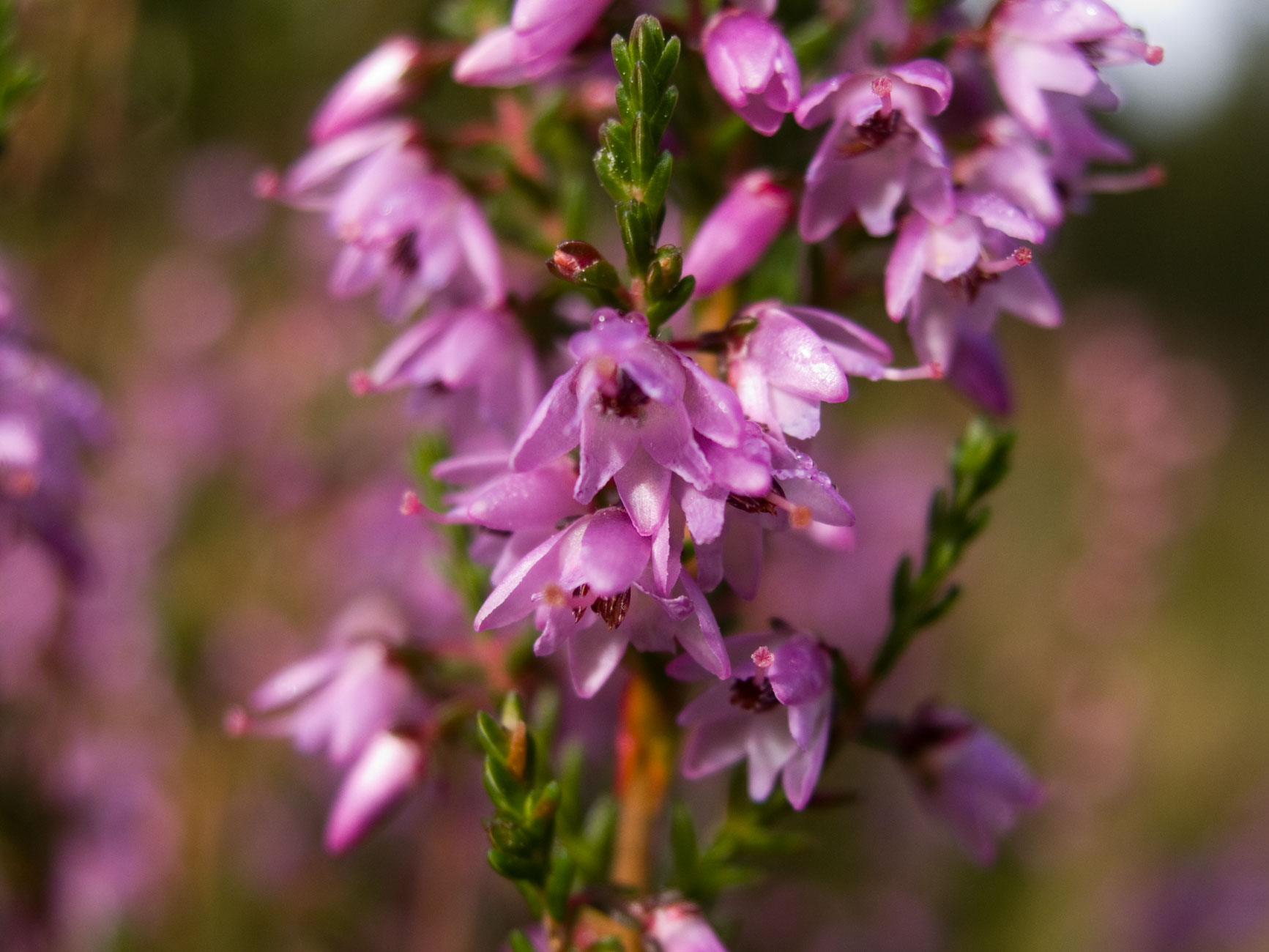
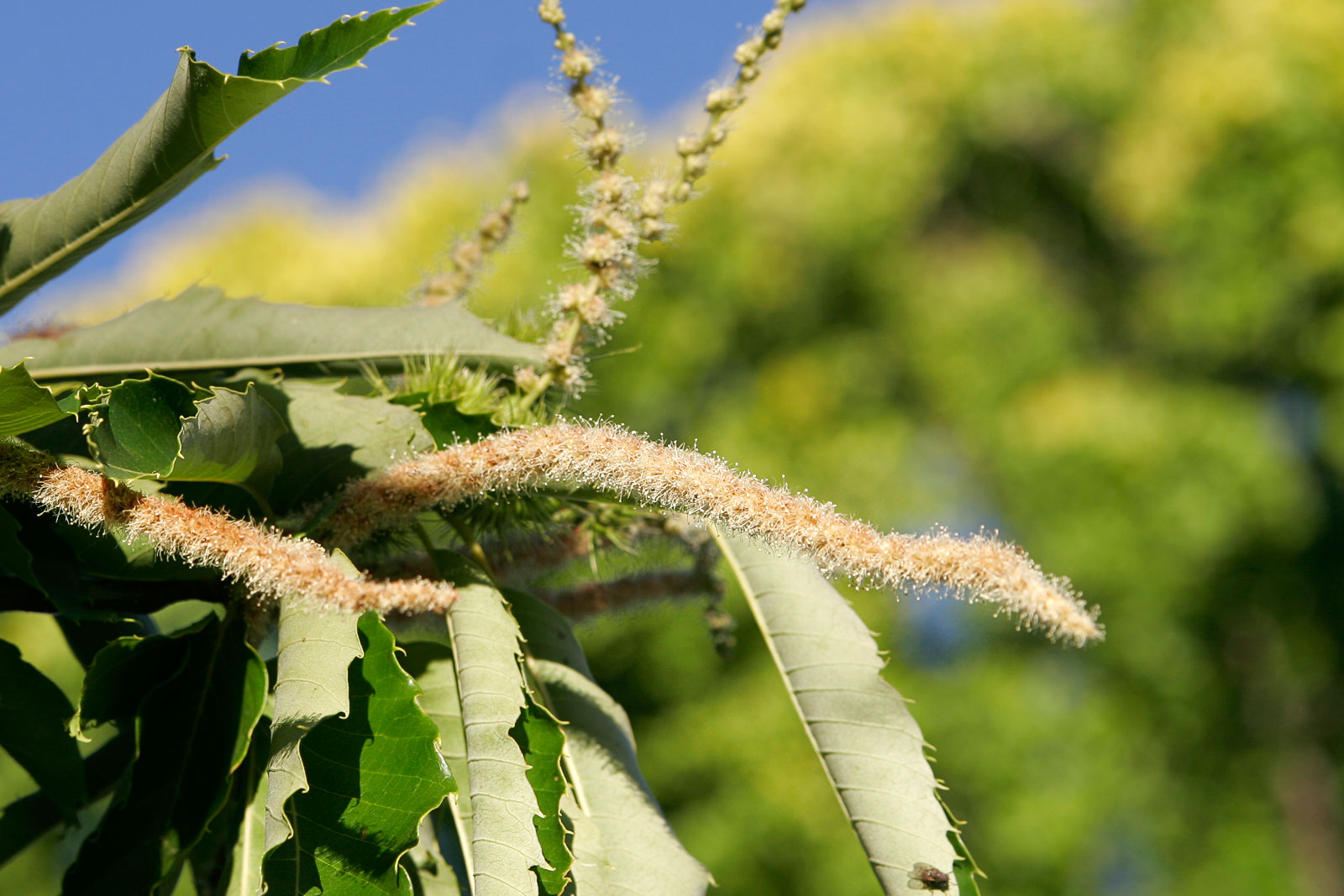
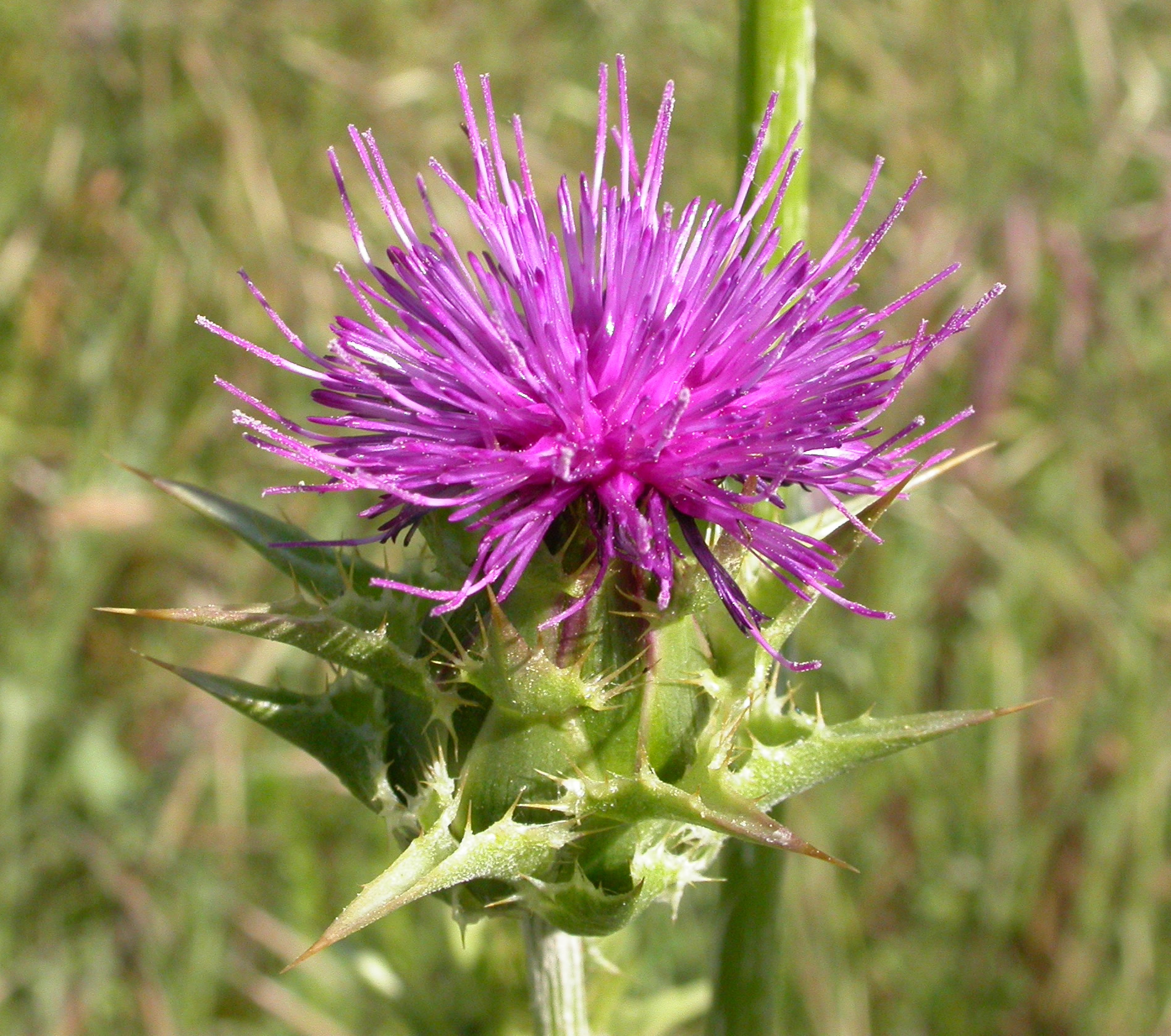
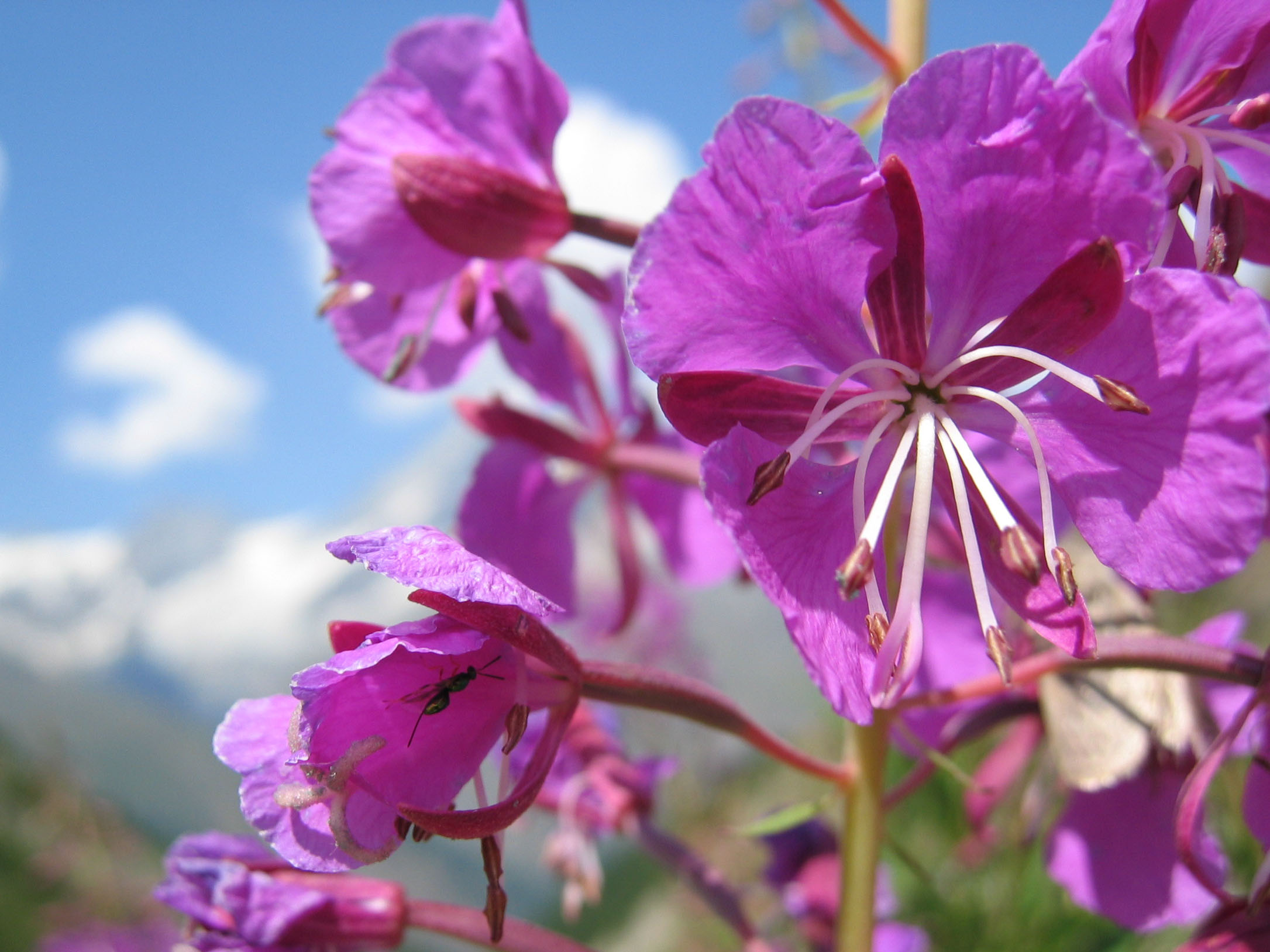
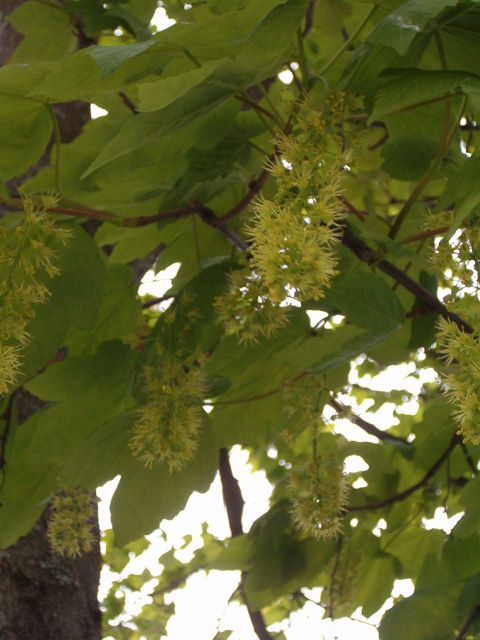
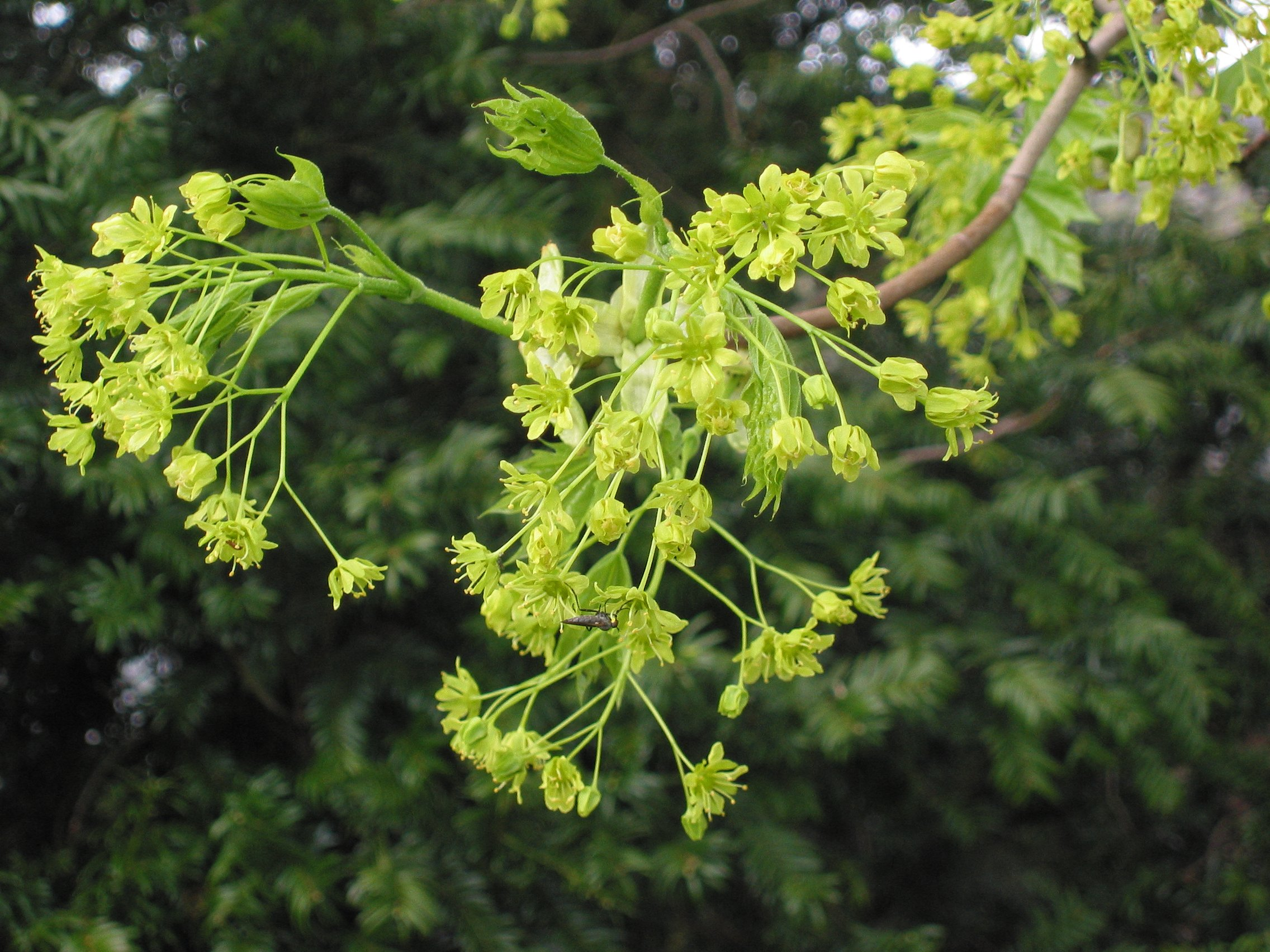
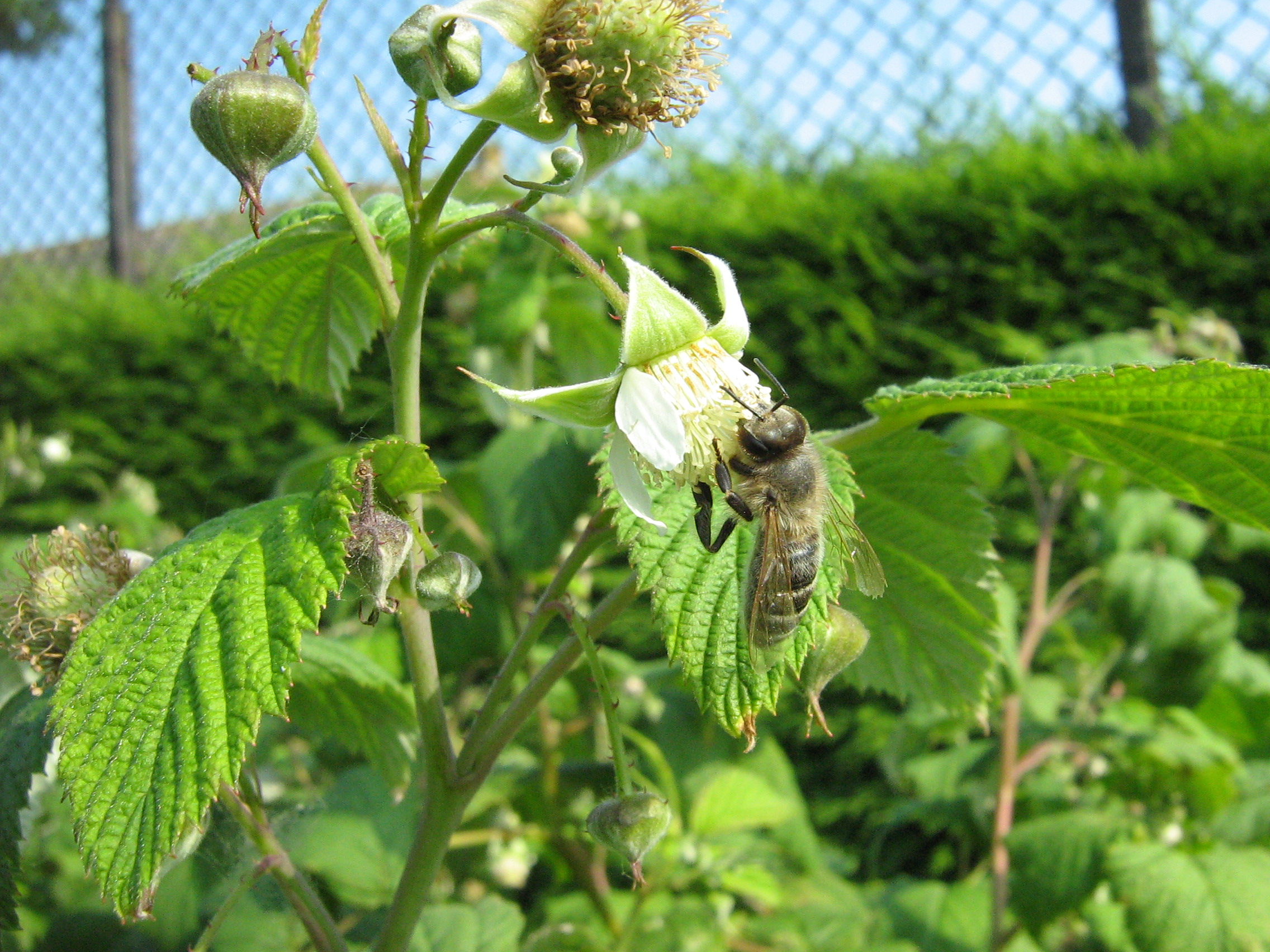
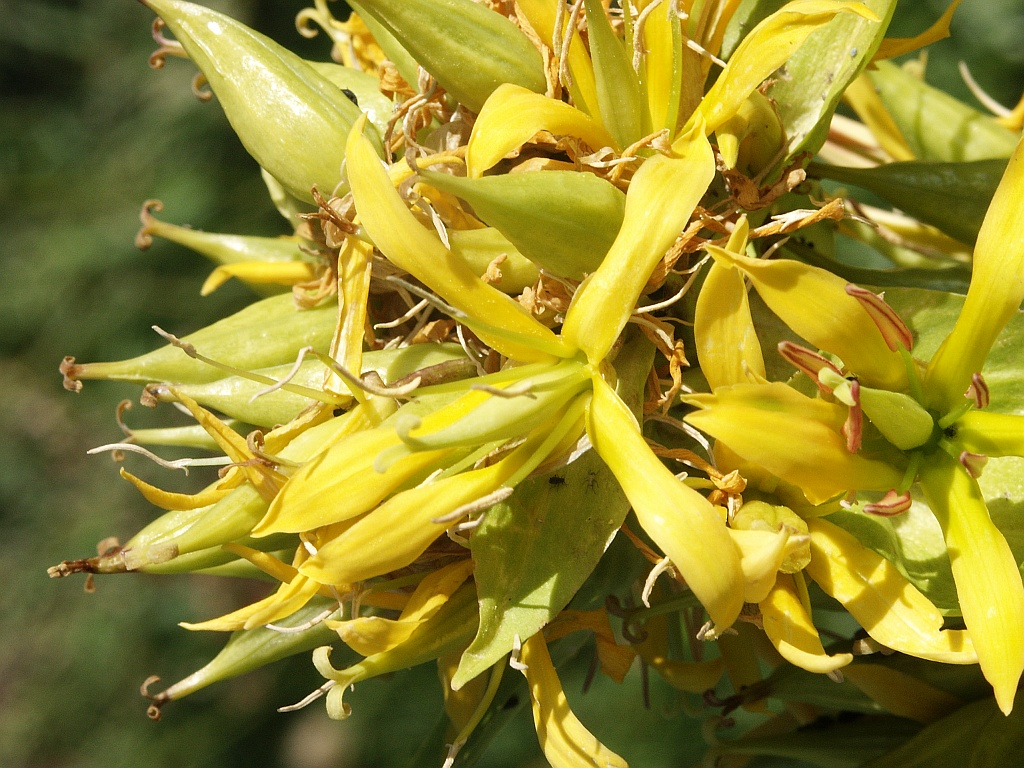
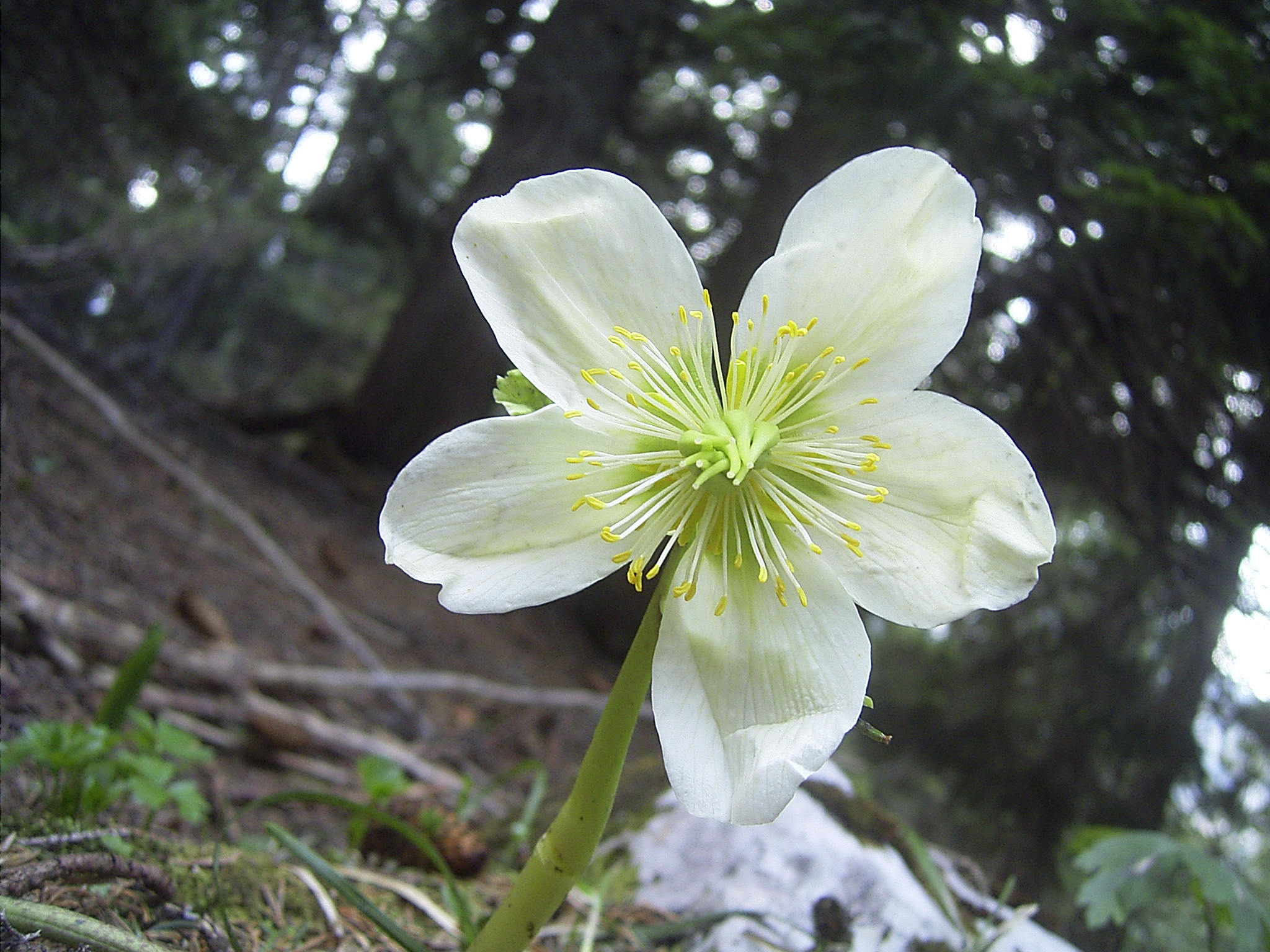
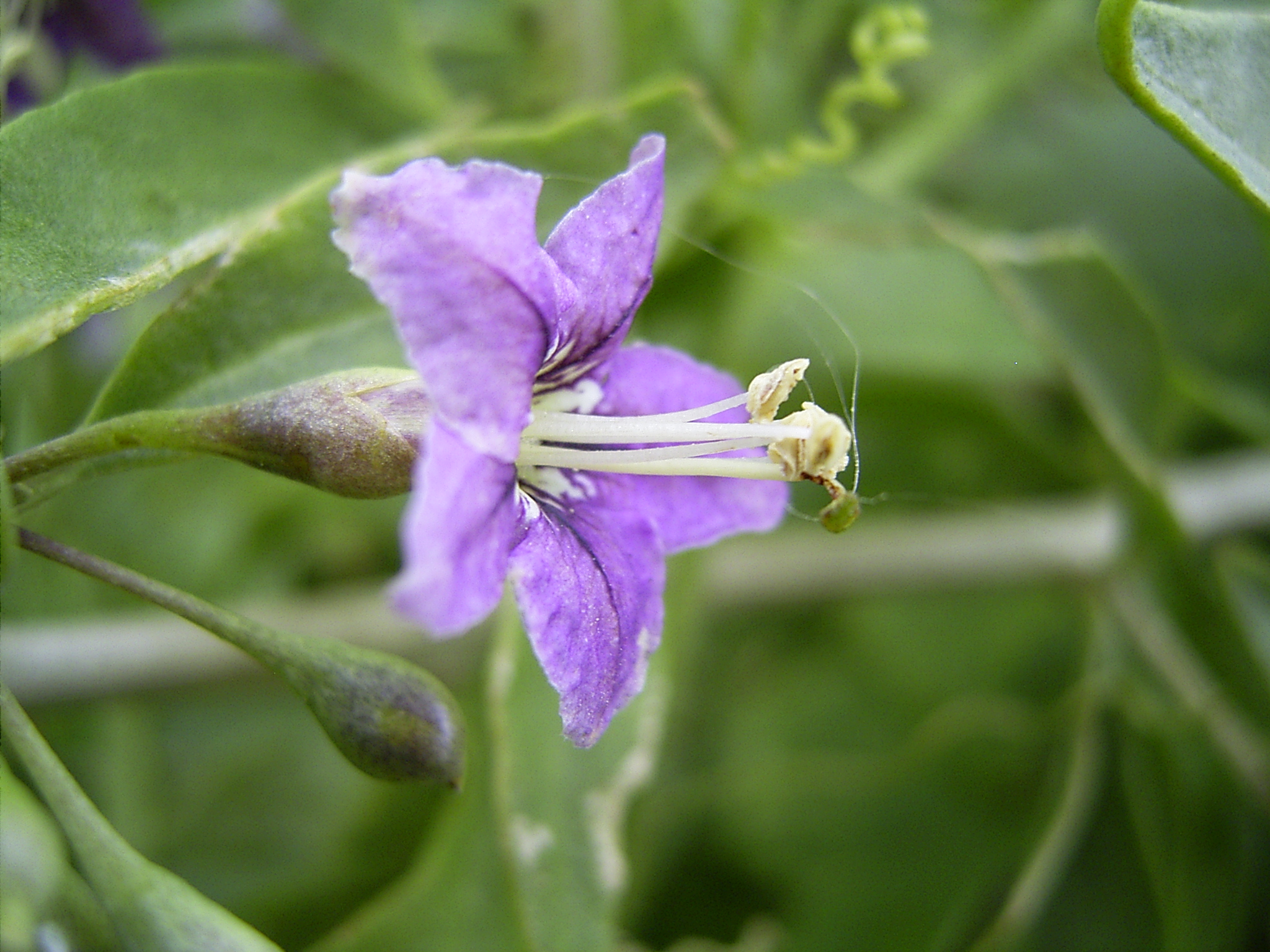
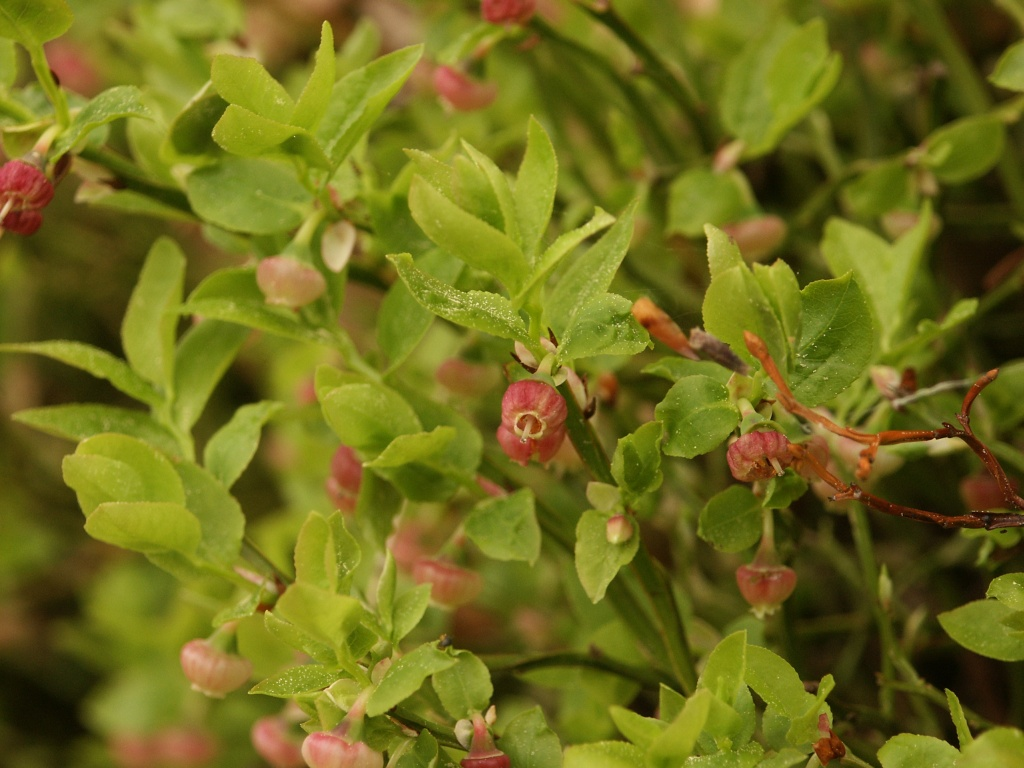
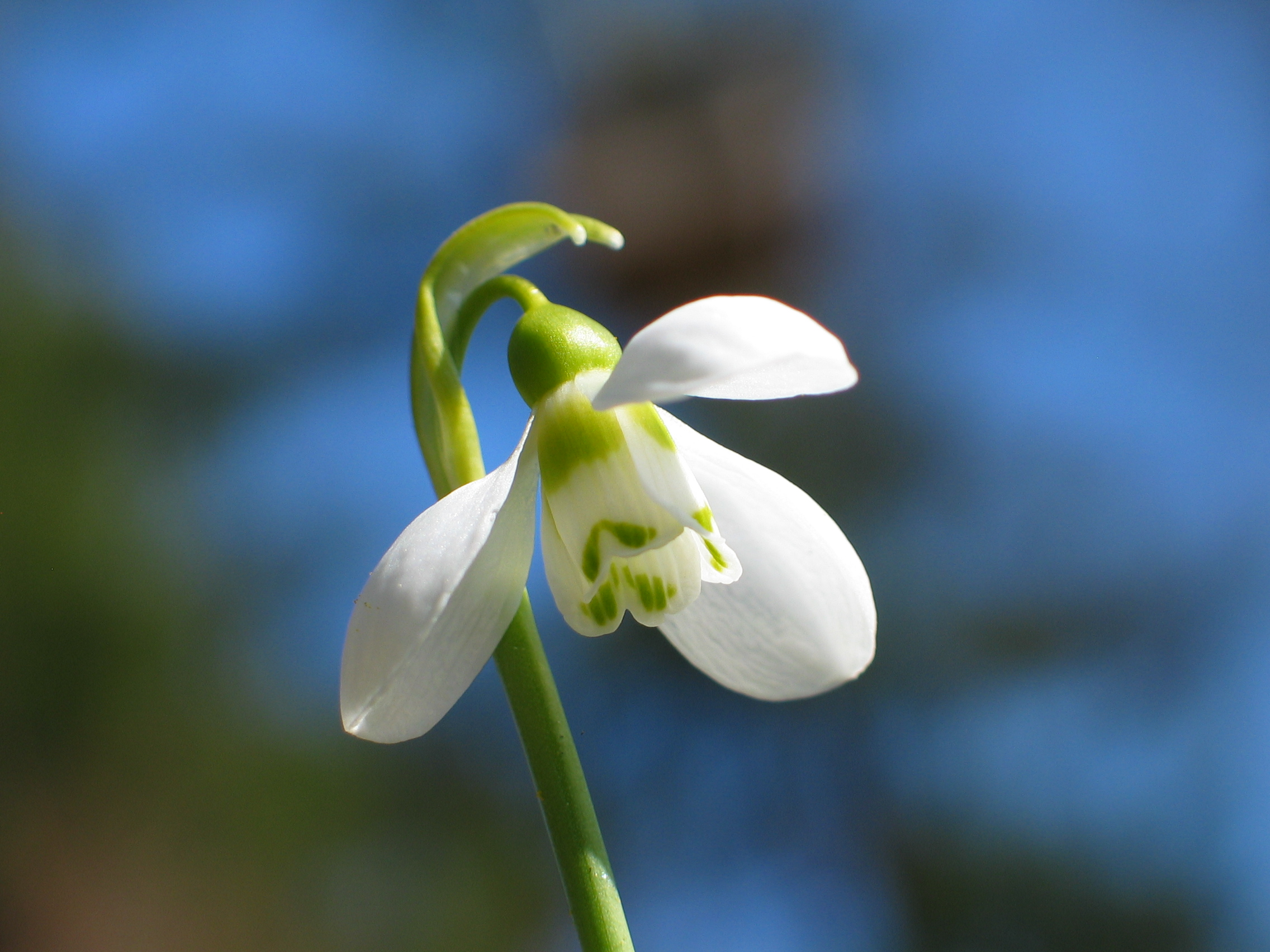
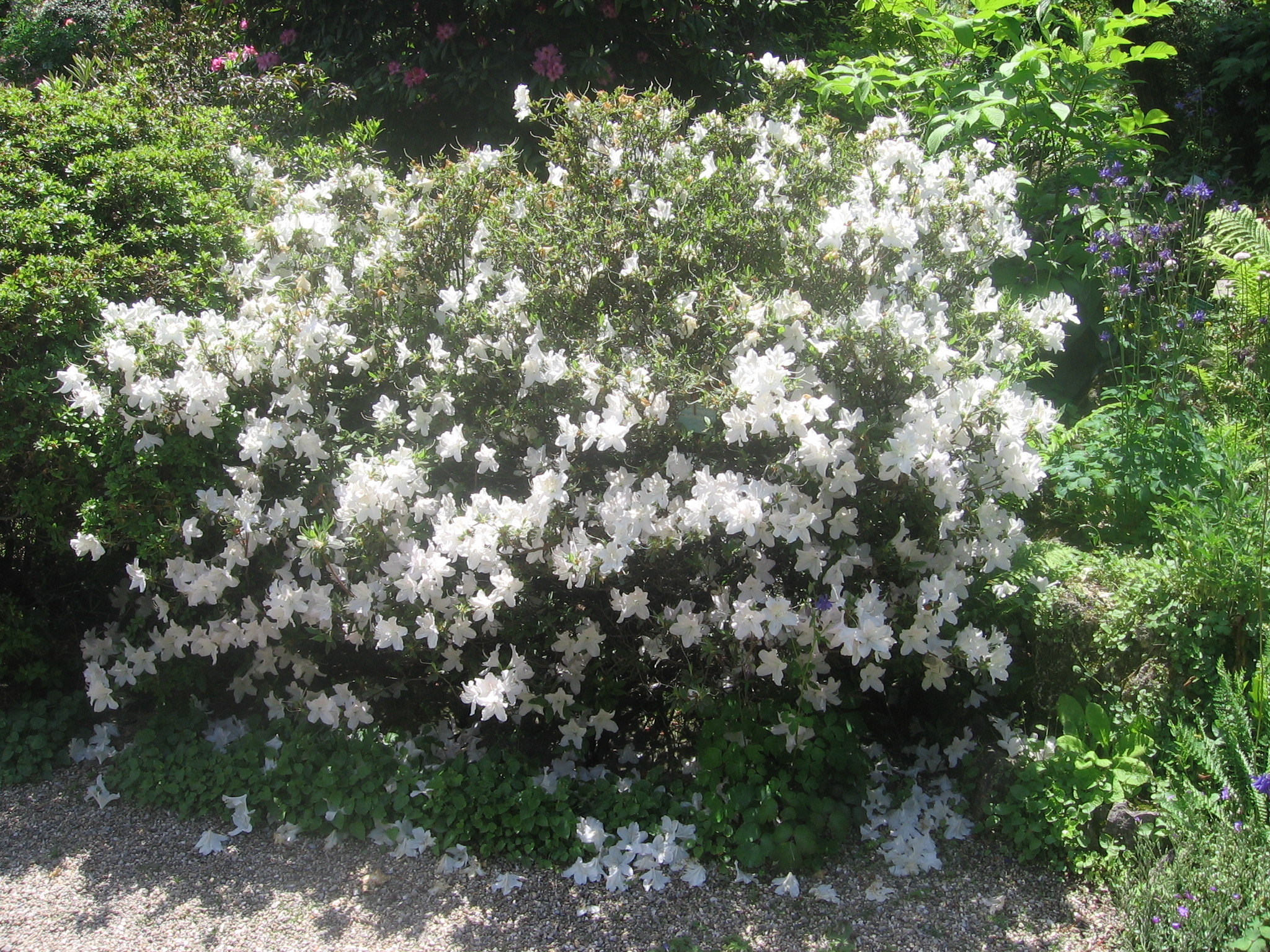
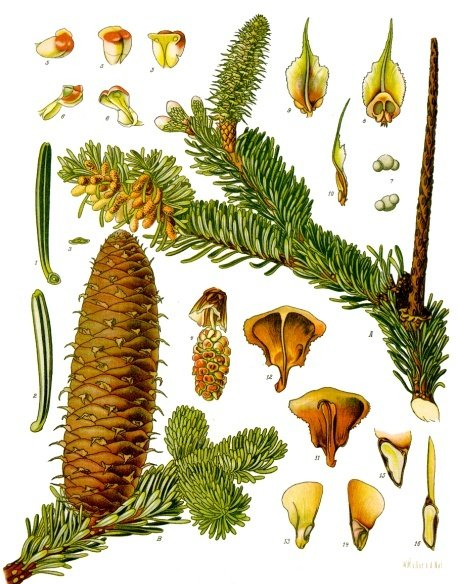
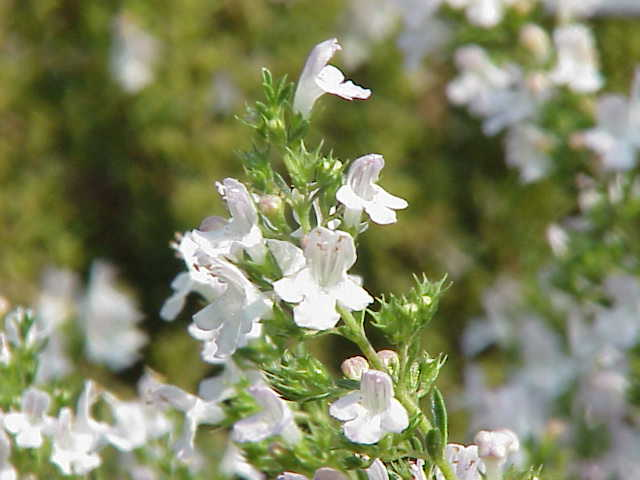
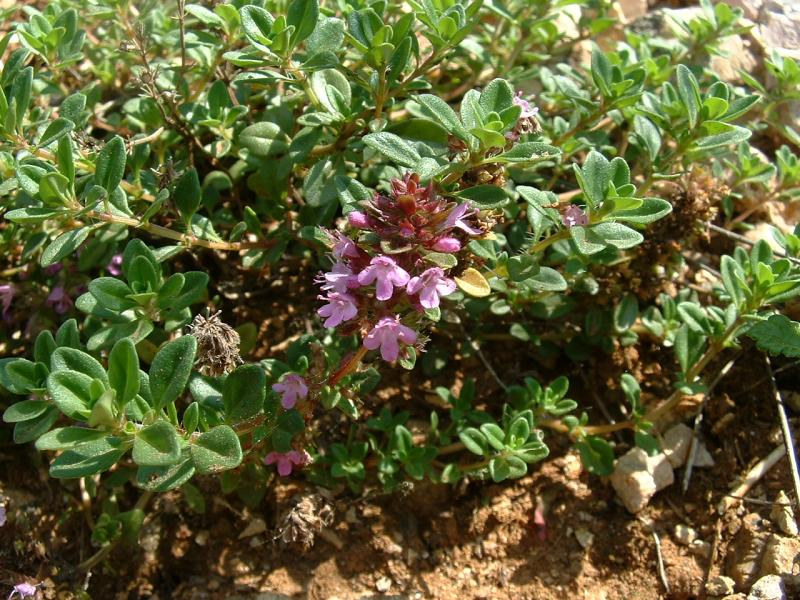
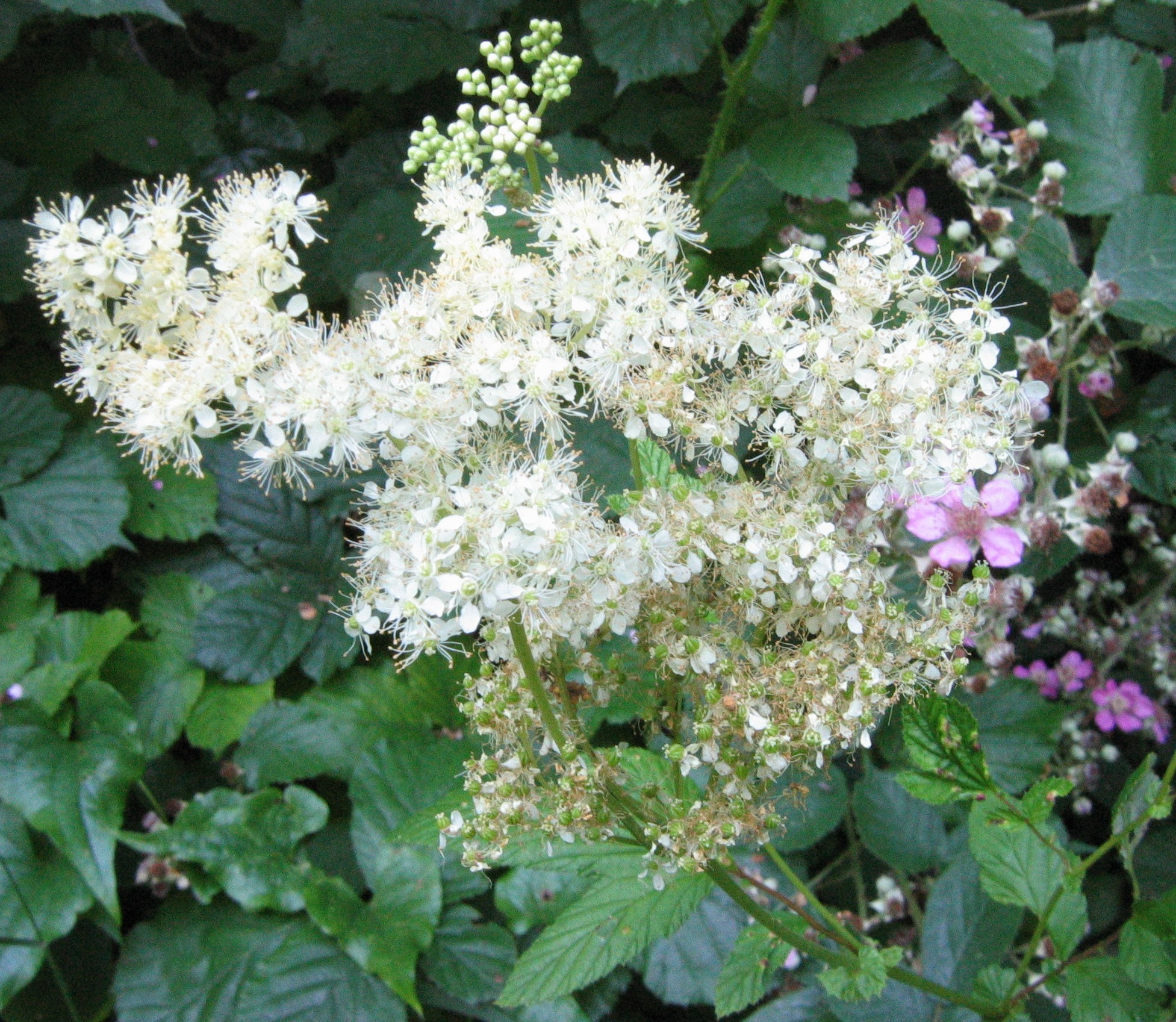
Image	Common name	Latin name	Flowering months	Nectar	Pollen	Propolis	Honeydew
	Garden angelica	Angelica sylvestris	07–08	X	X	.	.
	Wolf's bane	Arnica montana	07–08	X	X	.	.
	Erica	Erica cinerea	07–09	X	X	.	.
	Calluna	Calluna vulgaris	08–10	X	X	.	.
	Sweet chestnut	Castanea sativa	06–07	X	X	.	X
	Milk thistle	Silybum marianum	07–08	X	X	.	.
	Fireweed	Epilobium angustifolium	07–09	X	X	.	.
	Sycamore	Acer pseudoplatanus	03–04	X	X	X	X
	Norway maple	Acer platanoides	05–06	X	X	.	X
	Raspberry	Rubus idaeus	06–07	X	X	.	.
	Great yellow gentian	Gentiana lutea	07–08	X	X	.	.
	Hellebore	Helleborus niger	01–04	X	X	.	.
	Boxthorn	Lycium barbarum	07–08	X	X	.	.
	Blueberry	Vaccinium myrtillus	05–06	X	X	.	.
	Snowdrop	Galanthus nivalis	01–03	X	X	.	.
	Rhododendron	Rhododendron ferrugineum	06–08	X	X	.	.
	Silver fir	Abies alba	05	.	X	.	X
	Savory	Satureja montana	07–08	X	.	.	.
	Wild thyme	Thymus serpyllum	06–09	X	.	.	.
	Rowan	Sorbus aucuparia	05–06	X	X	X	.

=== Cultured plants ===
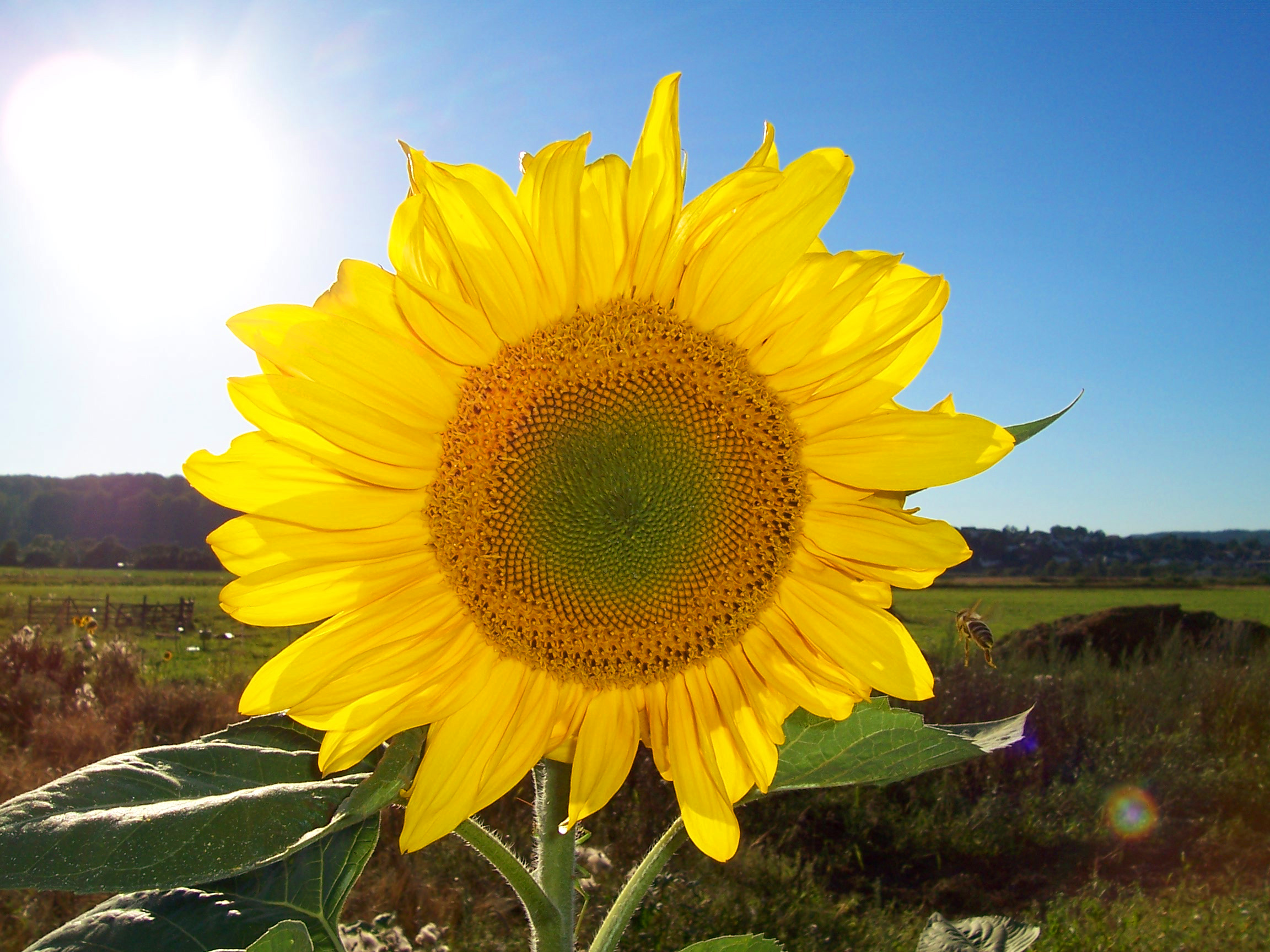
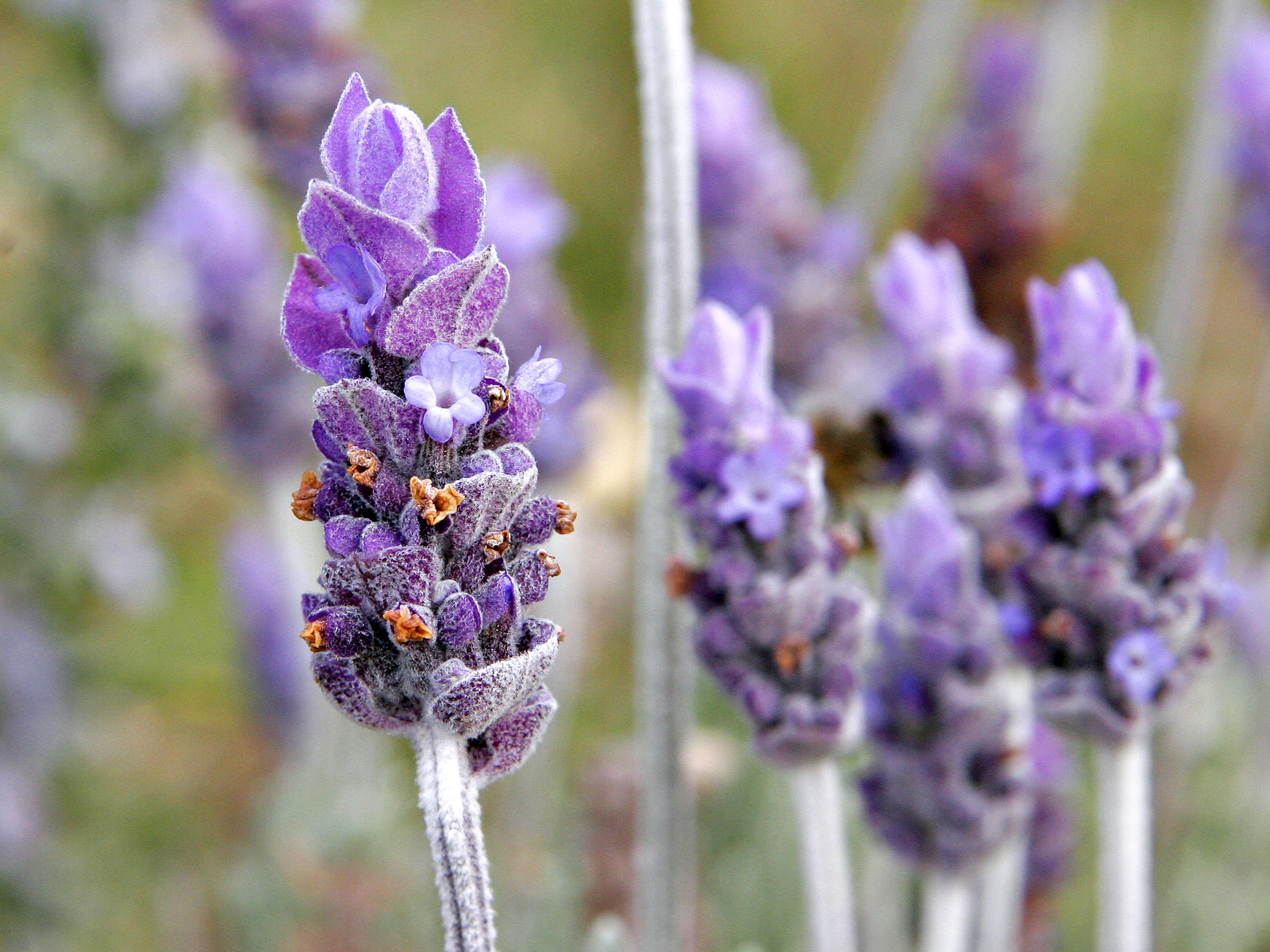
Image	Common name	Latin name	Flowering months	Nectar	Pollen	Propolis	Honeydew
	Sunflower	Helianthus annuus	07–08	X	X	.	.
	Lavender	Lavandula intermedia	06–07	X	X	.	.
