= List of Thyreus species =

This is a list of species in the bee genus Thyreus:

- Thyreus abdominalis (Friese]], 1905)
- Thyreus abyssinicus (Radoszkowski, 1873)
- Thyreus affinis (Morawitz]], 1874)
- Thyreus africana (Radoszkowski, 1893)
- Thyreus aistleitneri Straka & Engel, 2012
- Thyreus albolateralis (Cockerell, 1919)
- Thyreus albomaculatus (De Geer, 1778)
- Thyreus alfkeni (Brauns, 1909)
- Thyreus altaicus (Radoszkowski, 1893)
- Thyreus axillaris (Vachal, 1903)
- Thyreus batelkai Straka & Engel, 2012
- Thyreus bimaculatus (Radoszkowski, 1893)
- Thyreus bouyssoui (Vachal, 1903)
- Thyreus brachyaspis (Cockerell, 1936)
- Thyreus caeruleopunctatus (Blanchard, 1840)
- Thyreus calceatus (Vachal, 1903)
- Thyreus callurus (Cockerell, 1919)
- Thyreus calophanes Lieftinck, 1962
- Thyreus castalius Lieftinck, 1962
- Thyreus centrimacula (Pérez, 1905)
- Thyreus ceylonicus (Friese, 1905)
- Thyreus chinensis (Radoszkowski, 1893)
- Thyreus cyathiger Lieftinck, 1962
- Thyreus decorus (Smith, 1852)
- Thyreus delumbatus (Vachal, 1903)
- Thyreus denolii Straka & Engel, 2012
- Thyreus elegans (Morawitz, 1878)
- Thyreus empeyi Eardley, 1991
- Thyreus erythraeensis (Meyer, 1921)
- Thyreus fallibilis Kohl, 1906)
- Thyreus forchhammeri Eardley, 1991
- Thyreus formosanus (Meyer, 1921)
- Thyreus fortissimus (Cockerell & Mackie, 1933)
- Thyreus frieseanus (Cockerell, 1905)
- Thyreus gambiensis (Cockerell & Mackie, 1933)
- Thyreus garouensis Engel, 2014
- Thyreus grahami (Cockerell, 1910)
- Thyreus hellenicus Lieftinck, 1968
- Thyreus himalayensis (Radoszkowski, 1893)
- Thyreus hirtus (de Beaumont, 1940)
- Thyreus histrio (Fabricius, 1775)
- Thyreus histrionicus (Illiger, 1806)
- Thyreus hohmanni Schwarz, 1993
- Thyreus hyalinatus (Vachal, 1903)
- Thyreus illudens Lieftinck, 1968
- Thyreus impexus Lieftinck, 1968
- Thyreus incultus Lieftinck, 1968
- Thyreus insignis (Meyer, 1921)
- Thyreus insolitus Lieftinck, 1962
- Thyreus interruptus (Vachal, 1903)
- Thyreus irena Lieftinck, 1962
- Thyreus janasivius (Sivik, 1957)
- Thyreus kilimandjaricus (Strand, 1911)
- Thyreus lieftincki Rozen, 1969
- Thyreus lugubris (Smith, 1879)
- Thyreus luzonensis (Cockerell, 1910)
- Thyreus macleayi (Cockerell, 1907)
- Thyreus maculiscutis (Cameron, 1905)
- Thyreus massuri (Radoszkowski, 1893)
- Thyreus medius (Meyer, 1921)
- Thyreus meripes (Vachal, 1903)
- Thyreus neavei (Cockerell, 1933)
- Thyreus nigroventralis (Meyer, 1921)
- Thyreus niloticus (Cockerell, 1937)
- Thyreus nitidulus (Fabricius, 1804)
- Thyreus novaehollandiae (Lepeletier, 1841)
- Thyreus nubicus (Lepeletier, 1841)
- Thyreus orbatus (Lepeletier, 1841)
- Thyreus oxaspis (Cockerell, 1936)
- Thyreus parthenope Lieftinck, 1968
- Thyreus pica (Strand, 1921)
- Thyreus picaron Lieftinck, 1968
- Thyreus picicornis (Morawitz, 1875)
- Thyreus pictus (Smith, 1854)
- Thyreus plumifer (Brauns, 1909)
- Thyreus praestans Lieftinck, 1962
- Thyreus praevalens (Kohl, 1905)
- Thyreus pretextus (Vachal, 1903)
- Thyreus priesneri Lieftinck, 1968
- Thyreus proximus (Meyer, 1921)
- Thyreus quadrimaculatus (Radoszkowski, 1893)
- Thyreus quinquefasciatus (Smith, 1879)
- Thyreus ramosellus (Cockerell, 1919)
- Thyreus ramosus (Lepeletier, 1841)
- Thyreus regalis Lieftinck, 1962
- Thyreus rotundatus (Friese, 1905)
- Thyreus rufitarsus (Rayment, 1931)
- Thyreus schwarzi Straka & Engel, 2012
- Thyreus scotaspis (Vachal, 1903)
- Thyreus scutellaris (Fabricius, 1781)
- Thyreus sejuncta (Saussure, 1890)
- Thyreus shebicus Engel, 2014
- Thyreus sicarius Lieftinck, 1962
- Thyreus smithii (Dalla Torre, 1896)
- Thyreus somalicus (Strand, 1911)
- Thyreus sphenophorus Lieftinck, 1962
- Thyreus splendidulus (Lepeletier, 1841)
- Thyreus stellifera (Cockerell, 1936)
- Thyreus strandi (Meyer, 1921)
- Thyreus surniculus Lieftinck, 1959
- Thyreus takaonis (Cockerell, 1911)
- Thyreus tinctus (Cockerell, 1905)
- Thyreus tricuspis (Pérez, 1883)
- Thyreus truncatus (Pérez, 1883)
- Thyreus tschoffeni (Vachal, 1903)
- Thyreus uniformis (Kirby, 1900)
- Thyreus vachali (Friese, 1905)
- Thyreus wallacei (Cockerell, 1905)
- Thyreus waroonensis (Cockerell, 1913)
