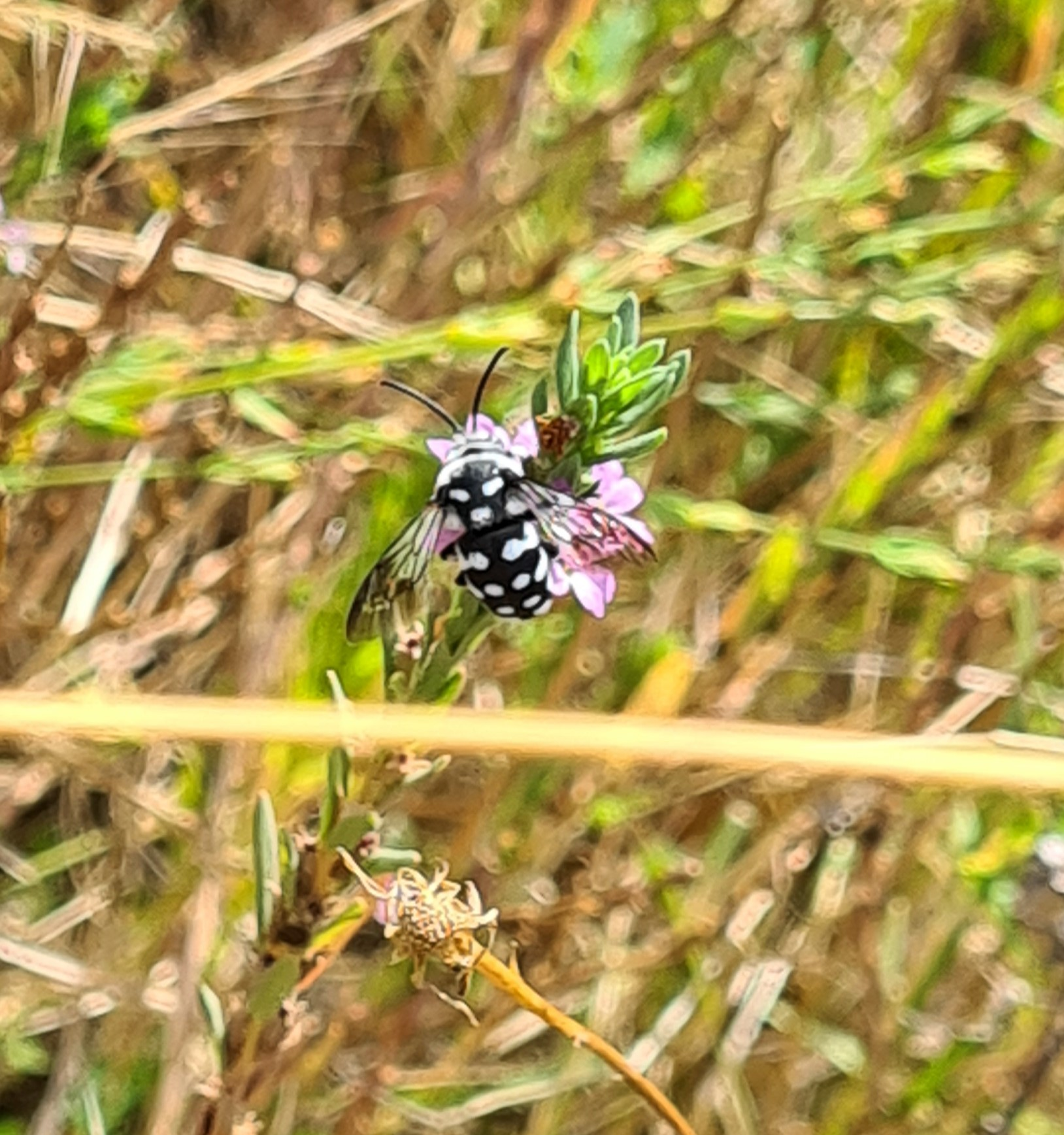

Scientific classification
- Kingdom: Animalia
- Phylum: Arthropoda
- Clade: Pancrustacea
- Class: Insecta
- Order: Hymenoptera
- Family: Apidae
- Genus: Thyreus
- Species: T. waroonensis

Binomial name
- Thyreus waroonensis (Cockerell, 1913)

Synonyms
- Crocisa waroonensis Cockerell, 1913

= Thyreus waroonensis =

Species of bee

Thyreus waroonensis, the Waroona cuckoo bee, is a species of bee in the family Apidae. It was described by Theodore D. A. Cockerell in 1913. The body is 8–12 mm long, and the dorsal side is black with white hair spots. The species occurs across a large part of mainland Australia. It is a kleptoparasite, using bees from the Amegilla genus as hosts.

== Taxonomy ==
The Waroona cuckoo bee was first described by American entomologist Theodore D. A. Cockerell, who named it Crocisa waroonensis in 1913. He named it after the town of Waroona in Western Australia, which is where the holotype was found. The species was re-described as Thyreus waroonensis by Dutch entomologist Maurits Lieftinck in 1962.

== Description ==
The body is 8–12 mm long and the forewings are 7.5–10 mm long. The dorsal side is black with white hair spots. The forewings are translucent near the body and smoky black over the distal half. The hindwings are mostly translucent, but gradually darkening over the tips.

The overall appearance is similar to T. caeruleopunctatus, but T. waroonensis has longer and more slender antennae.

== Distribution and habitat ==
This species occurs across a large part of mainland Australia, and it has also been recorded on Rottnest Island.

== Behaviour and ecology ==
Thyreus waroonensis is kleptoparasitic, with some Amegilla species serving as the hosts. When the host bee is absent, the Waroona cuckoo bee enters the Amegilla nest and bites a small hole in the cap of a freshly sealed cell. She then places an egg near the host egg and repairs the hole in the cell. The T. waroonensis larva has enlarged mandibles which it uses to kill the host egg and eat the cell provisions. It is believed the Amegilla host species include A. chlorocyanea and A. calva.

Thyreus waroonensis has been observed collecting nectar from the flowers of various species, including Eucalyptus and Melaleuca.
