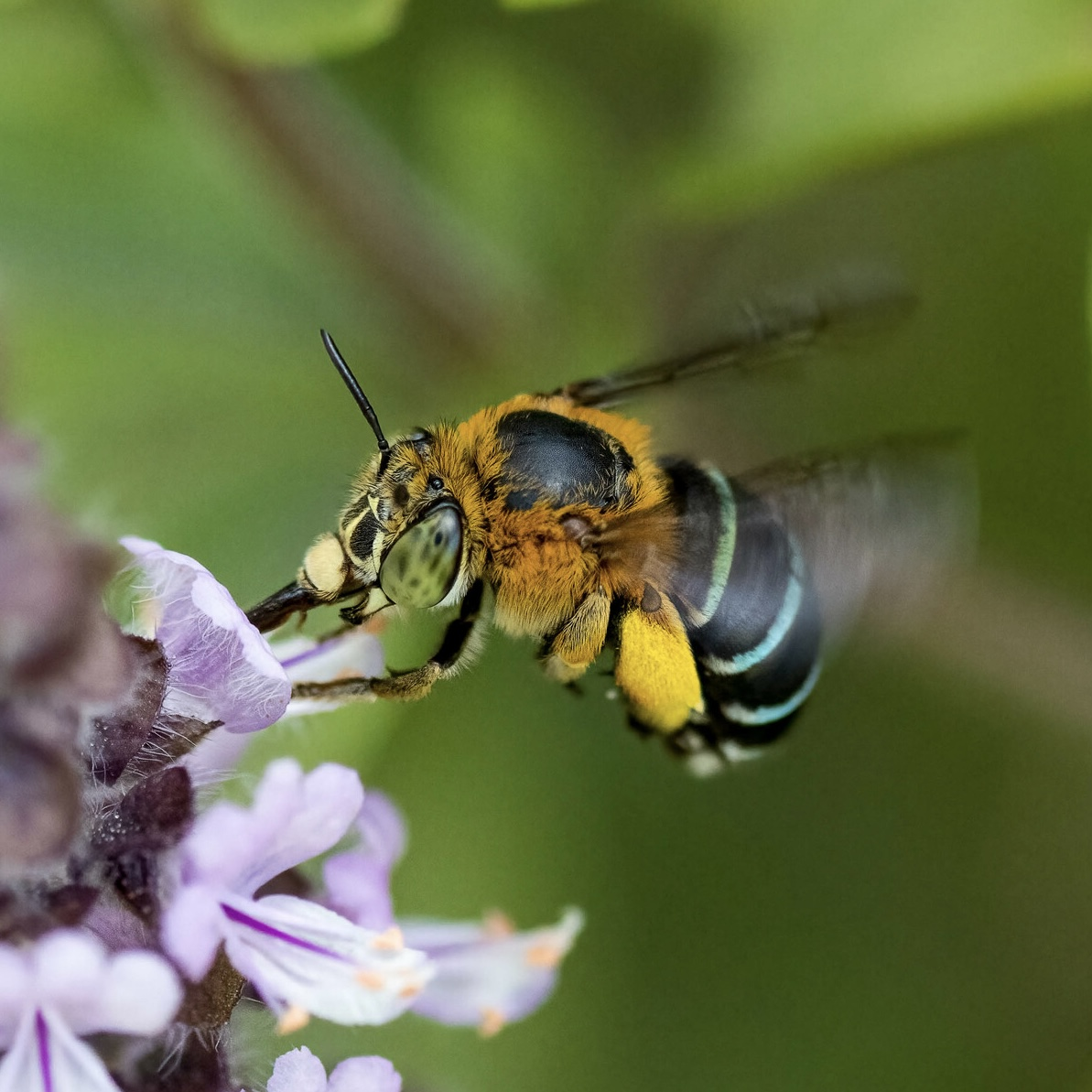
- Australian Banded-Digger, a bee in the subgenus Zonamegilla

Scientific classification
- Domain: Eukaryota
- Kingdom: Animalia
- Phylum: Arthropoda
- Class: Insecta
- Order: Hymenoptera
- Family: Apidae
- Genus: Amegilla
- Subgenus: Zonamegilla; Popov, 1950

= Zonamegilla =

Subgenus of bee

Zonamegilla is a large subgenus of the bee genus Amegilla. Species of this subgenus can be found throughout Australia, Europe and Asia. Some Zonamegilla are commonly referred to as blue-banded bees; however, the abdominal bands can also be orange, green, white or yellow, depending on the species.
