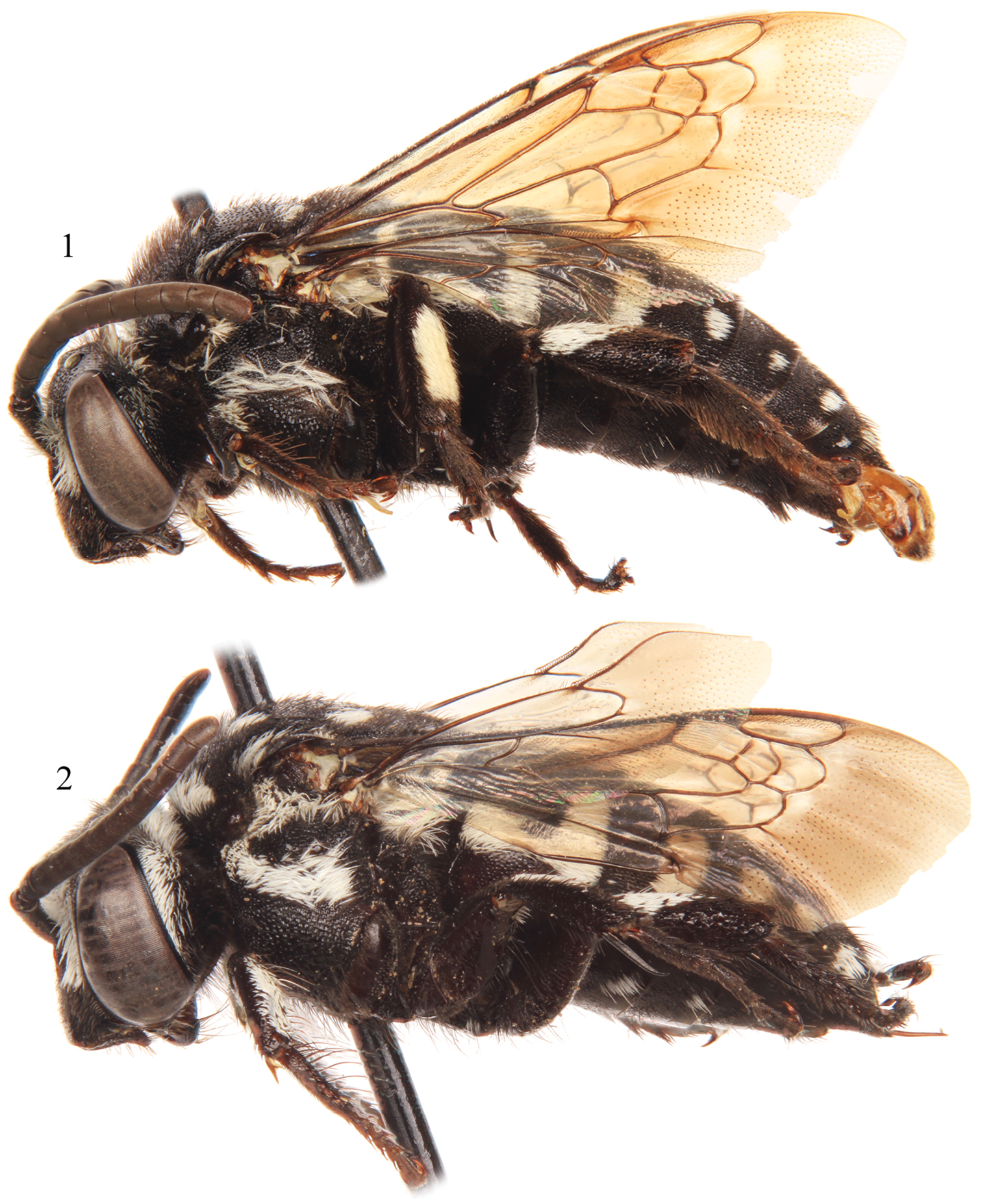
- Male (top) and female (bottom) T. denolii specimens from Boavista, in Cape Verde.

Scientific classification
- Kingdom: Animalia
- Phylum: Arthropoda
- Clade: Pancrustacea
- Class: Insecta
- Order: Hymenoptera
- Family: Apidae
- Genus: Thyreus
- Species: T. denolii

Binomial name
- Thyreus denolii Straka & Engel, 2012

= Thyreus denolii =

Species of insect

Thyreus denolli is an African species of kleptoparisitic bee. It belongs to the tribe Melectini and to the genus Thyreus, the members of which are often referred to as 'Cuckoo bees', due to their parasitic behaviour. It is one of the most distinctive Thyreus bees in Cape Verde.

== History ==
The species was first described in 2012, and was named after the Genoese navigator António de Noli, who after being exiled from his home country discovered the Cape Verde Islands around 1456 while he was working for Portugal.

T. denolii, along with the other species of Thyreus found in Cape Verde, closely resembles the species Thyreus hohmanni, as well as the more widespread Thyreus ramosus. T. hohmanni is endemic to the Canary Islands, another macronesian archipelago. It is thus possible that the Thyreus bees of Cape Verde came from the Canary Islands, and separated into separate species across the Cape Verde islands. Similarly, it is possible that all endemic Thyreus species in the macronesian share a nearest common ancestor within populations of Thyreus ramosus.

== Range ==
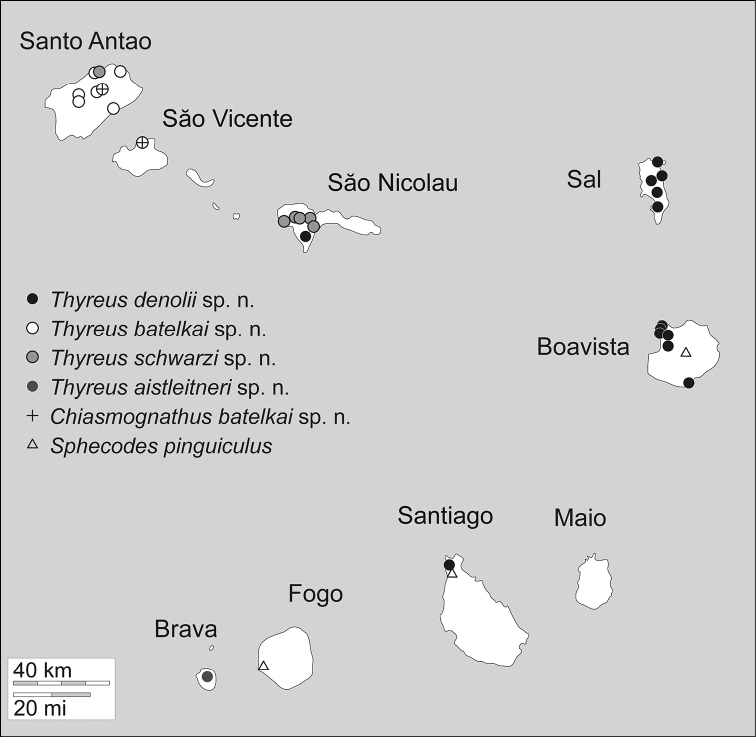
The ranges of various bees in the islands of Cape Verde, including T. denolii.

Thyreus denolli has been recorded in the islands of Sal, Boa Vista, Santiago, and possibly São Nicolau, in Cape Verde. It is one of four species of Thyreus bees in the area, the other three being Thyreus batelkai, Thyreus schwarzi, and Thyreus aistleitneri.

== Description ==
Despite their relative isolation from each other, the species of T. denolii across Sal, Boavista, and Santiago do not seem to show any significant difference in appearance or morphology.

The female is approximately 8.1–10.6mm long, while the male is a little smaller, with a total body length of approximately 7.5–9.9 mm. The heads of the males are approximately 2.7mm long and 3.5mm wide. The female's head is about 3.2 mm long and 3.9 mm wide.

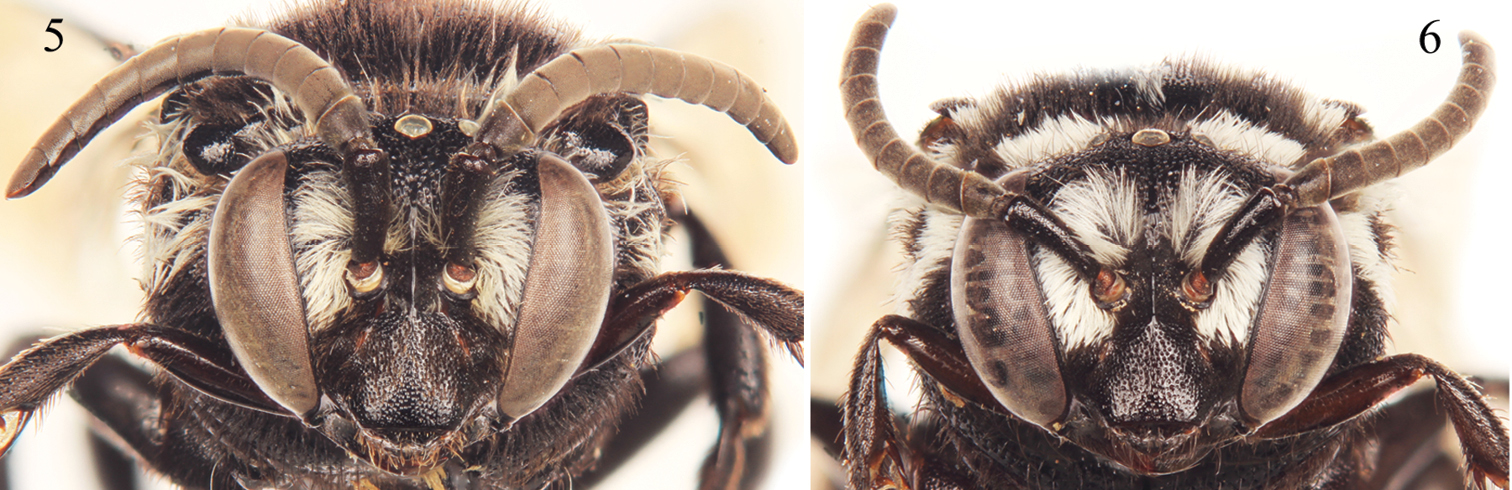
Facial view of T. denoli. Male is on left and female is on right.

Like all members of its genus, T. denolli has brightly contrasting coloured patterns on its body. The males can be distinguished from other species of Thyreus in the region by its sixth metasomal tergum (that is, the sixth segment of the posterior part of its body). From the side, the white markings on this segment are usually the same size as those on the fourth and fifth terga. In the female, from the side, the white patches on the fifth tergum are the same size as those on the fourth and third terga.

From the front the faces of both sexes very similar to the other members of Thyreus on the island. In the males, the distance between the two eyes is 1.8mm at the top of the eyes and 1.3mm at the bottom. In the females, the distance between the eyes is about 1.9mm at the top and 1.3mm at the bottom.

Both sexes are covered in black or dark brownish-grey pubescence (short hairs) over most of the body. However, parts of the face, legs, and the mesosoma (the middle section of the body) are covered with white, feathery hairs instead.

== Breeding and parasitism ==
The primary hosts of T. denolii and the other three members of Thyreus in Cape Verde are bees in the genus Amegilla, with which it is commonly associated in the field. If the various populations of T. denolli across the islands are indeed separate species, then it is parasitic on three separate species of Amagilla.

Being a member of Melectini, T. denolii is a kleptoparasitic insect. The females of this tribe lay their eggs in the nest of their host, and their larvae use the resources and stored food provided by the host, at the expense of the host's young.
