= Thyreus quadrimaculatus =

Scientific classification
- Kingdom: Animalia
- Phylum: Arthropoda
- Clade: Pancrustacea
- Class: Insecta
- Order: Hymenoptera
- Family: Apidae
- Genus: Thyreus
- Species: T. quadrimaculatus

Binomial name
- Thyreus quadrimaculatus (Radoszkowski, 1893)

Synonyms
- Crocisa quadrimaculata Radoszkowski, 1893

Species of bee

Thyreus quadrimaculatus, is a species of bee in the family Apidae and subfamily Apinae. It is endemic to Australia. It was described by Polish entomologist Oktawiusz Radoszkowski in 1893.

== Distribution and habitat ==
The species occurs in central and south-eastern Australia. The exact type locality is unknown, but published localities include White Swamp, near Koreelah National Park in north-eastern New South Wales, as well as Adelaide and Finke River.

== Behaviour ==
The adults are flying mellivores. The species is kleptoparasitic, probably on Amegilla species.
