= Thyreus macleayi =

Scientific classification
- Kingdom: Animalia
- Phylum: Arthropoda
- Clade: Pancrustacea
- Class: Insecta
- Order: Hymenoptera
- Family: Apidae
- Genus: Thyreus
- Species: T. macleayi

Binomial name
- Thyreus macleayi (Cockerell, 1907)

Synonyms
- Crocisa macleayi Cockerell, 1907; Crocisa albomaculata Smith, 1868; Crocisa albovittata Friese, 1912; Crocisa plurinotata Meyer, 1921

Species of bee

Thyreus macleayi is a species of bee in the family Apidae and subfamily Apinae. It is endemic to Australia. It was described by British-American entomologist Theodore Dru Alison Cockerell in 1907.

== Description ==
Female body length is about 14 mm. Integumental colouration is mainly black, with lighter markings; the hair is white to reddish-white.

== Distribution and habitat ==
The species occurs across much of mainland Australia. Type localities include Geraldton in Western Australia.

== Behaviour ==
The adults are solitary flying mellivores. They are kleptoparasitic, probably on Amegilla species.
