= Asaropoda =

Scientific classification
- Domain: Eukaryota
- Kingdom: Animalia
- Phylum: Arthropoda
- Class: Insecta
- Order: Hymenoptera
- Family: Apidae
- Genus: Amegilla
- Subgenus: Asaropoda; Cockerell, 1926

Type species
- Saropoda bombiformis Smith, 1854

Subgenus of bees

Asaropoda is a subgenus of the bee genus Amegilla. It comprises 21 species, and is endemic to Australia and Papua New Guinea. The species within this subgenus range in body length from 12–24 mm (0.47–0.94 in).
