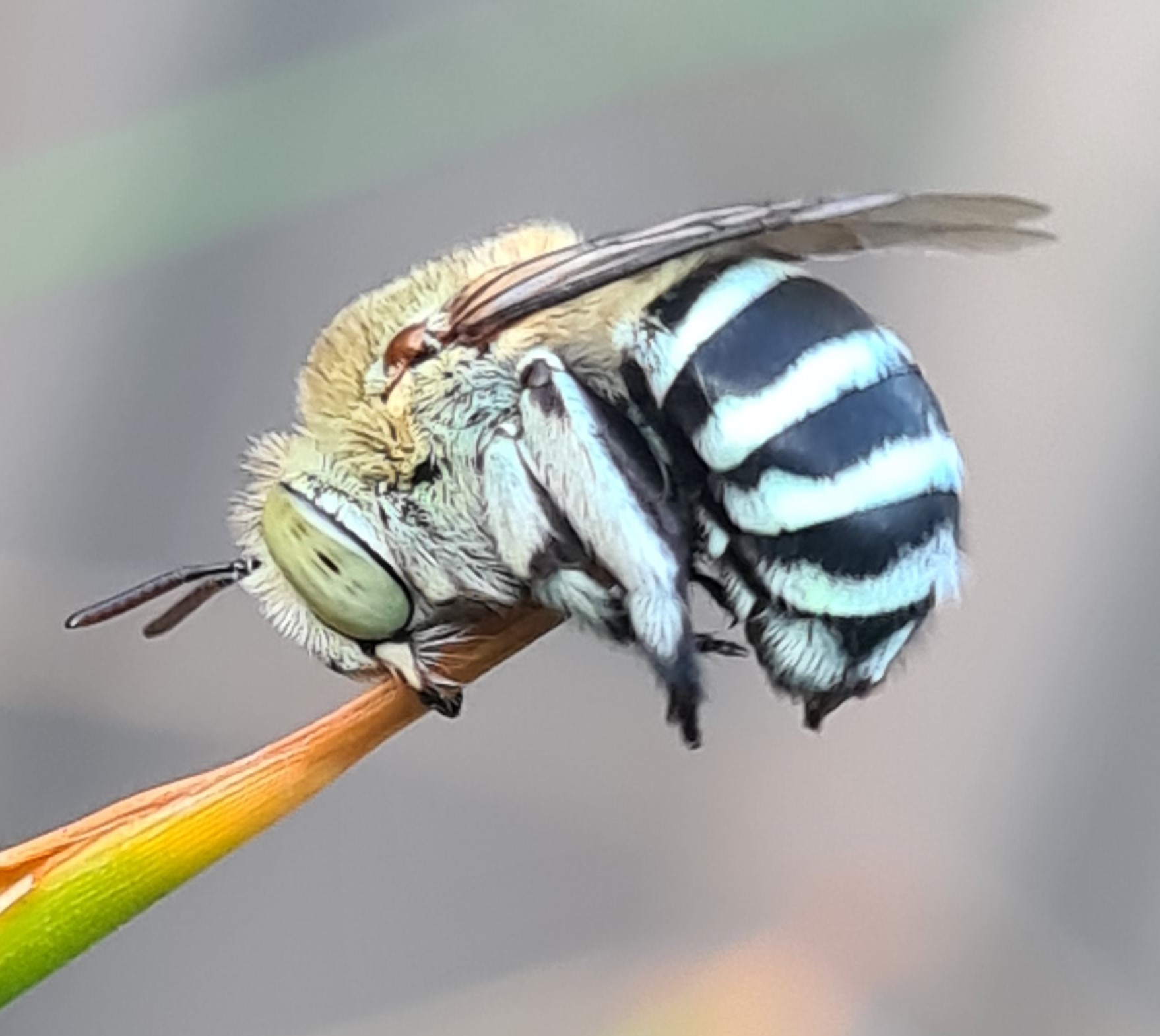

Scientific classification
- Kingdom: Animalia
- Phylum: Arthropoda
- Class: Insecta
- Order: Hymenoptera
- Family: Apidae
- Genus: Amegilla
- Subgenus: Notomegilla
- Species: A. chlorocyanea

Binomial name
- Amegilla chlorocyanea (Cockerell, 1914)

= Amegilla chlorocyanea =

Species of bee

Amegilla chlorocyanea, the blue-banded bee, is a species of bee in the family Apidae. It is one of two species in the subgenus Notomegilla. The abdominal hair bands are usually white with blue-green iridescence, but in about 10% of specimens the bands are orange. The outer leg hairs also have blue-green iridescence. It is endemic to Australia, and can be found across most of the mainland. In southern parts of the country it can be found in the warmer months, and in northern Australia it is active all year round. This species will visit the flowers of both native and introduced plants. It has shown potential as an important pollinator of tomatoes and other food crops.

== Taxonomy ==
The species was first described by Theodore D. A. Cockerell in 1914, who placed it in the genus Anthophora. It has been known by many other names, including Amegilla luteola and Amegilla tinsleyella. It is one of several species commonly known as the Blue-banded bee.

Amegilla chlorocyanea is one of two species in the subgenus Notomegilla.

== Description ==
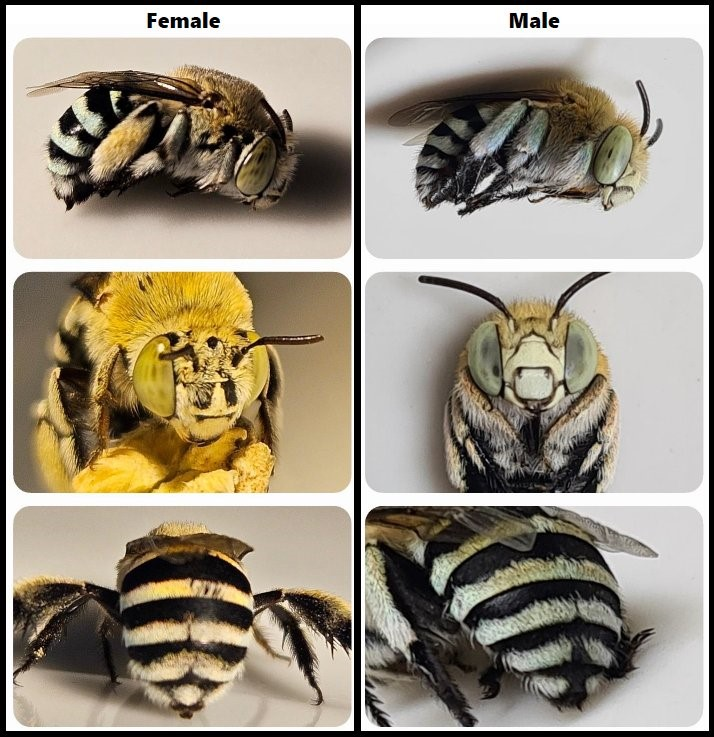
There are some key morphological differences between females and males, as shown

Males are approximately 11mm long, with females being a little larger at around 13mm long.

The eyes are large and grey-green. The antennae are black and the tongue is long. The labrum, mandibles and supraclypeal areas are pale yellow. The clypeus has a pale yellow upside-down T-shape, creating two black facial stripes that are much wider on the female. The areas around the eyes are black, with predominantly pale yellow hair.

The thoracic hair is mostly ginger or brown on top and white underneath. The metasoma has white hair bands with metallic blue-green iridescence, but in about 10% of specimens the bands are orange. Females have a large spot of pale hair on the end of the abdomen, with a hairless black triangle just above it. Males have notches of black hair on the end of the abdomen.

The legs have black hair closest to the body and mostly white hair on the outer parts. The outer leg hairs have a blue/green iridescence, which is a diagnostic feature of this species, however, it's not always visible in photos. Females have a short black streak of hair on the hind leg, which is not present in males.

== Distribution and habitat ==
Amegilla chlorocyanea is endemic to Australia, where it can be found across the mainland, particularly in the arid and temperate areas. It has also been recorded on several offshore islands, including Kangaroo Island, Barrow Island, Enderby Island and the Neptune Islands. A specimen was collected in Tasmania in 1948, but it's believed this was part of a failed introduction.

== Behaviour and ecology ==
This is a solitary species, however, females generally nest in groups. The nests are up to 100mm long, and are dug in sheltered positions in the ground. Common nesting locations include creek banks, under houses, dry mudbanks and old mortar or sandstone. A completed nest tunnel contains a series of cells, with each cell containing a single egg laid on a nectar/pollen mixture. A. chlorocyanea is believed to be a host of the kleptoparasitic Waroona cuckoo bee.

In southern parts of Australia, A. chlorocyanea is active in the warmer months, with activity peaking around January. In the north it can be found year-round, with activity peaks in May and October. This bee will visit the flowers of both native and introduced plants from a wide variety of plant families, and it's a buzz pollinator. Some of the native plants that it has been recorded on most often include; Eremophila sp., Ptilotus sp., Stemodia florulenta, Solanum sp., Dianella sp., Goodenia sp. and Scaevola sp. It has regularly been observed visiting the following garden plants and weeds; English Lavender (Lavandula angustifolia), Duranta erecta and Lantana camara.

== Importance to humans ==
There is evidence that Amegilla chlorocyanea could be an important pollinator of tomatoes and other crops. Researchers from The University of Adelaide found that in a greenhouse environment, a single buzz by a female bee increased tomato weight by 11% compared to an industrial pollination wand. When the bees were allowed unlimited flower visits, the tomatoes increased in weight by 21% more than the fruit that was wand-pollinated. Observations in the field suggest this species is a potential pollinator of eggplant, capsicum and lucerne (Medicago sativa). It has also been observed visiting the flowers of canola, watermelon, strawberry and pumpkin.

This species has been successfully reared in captivity using mud-brick blocks. Females can give a painful sting if handled, but they are not aggressive.
