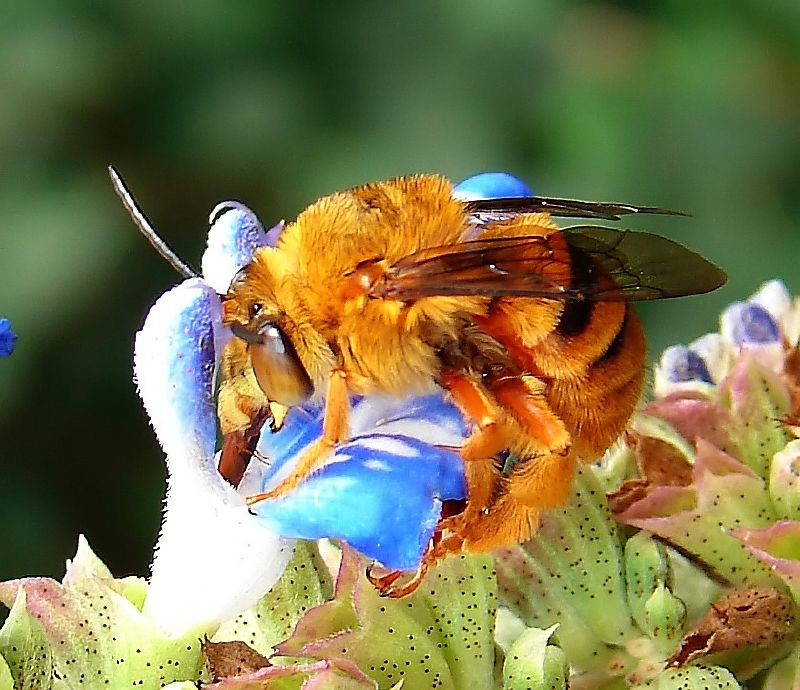

Scientific classification
- Kingdom: Animalia
- Phylum: Arthropoda
- Class: Insecta
- Order: Hymenoptera
- Family: Apidae
- Genus: Amegilla
- Species: A. bombiformis

Binomial name
- Amegilla bombiformis Smith, 1854

= Amegilla bombiformis =

Species of bee from Australia

Amegilla bombiformis is an Australian native bee in the family Apidae. It is one of several hairy bee species generally referred to as teddy bear bees due to their fuzzy appearance.

== Taxonomy and etymology ==
It was originally described by F. Smith in 1854 as Saropoda bombiformis from a collection near the Richmond River in New South Wales, before being reclassified in the genus Amegilla in 1965. Its specific epithet bombiformis is Latin for "form of a bumblebee".

== Description and identification ==
Amegilla bombiformis is a stocky bee which resembles a bumblebee in shape, and is covered in orange-brown fur. The abdomen has several dark hairless bands, seven in the case of males, six for females. It is similar in size to a European honeybee.

== Behaviour ==
A. bombiformis has been recorded visiting Abelia, Buddleja, and blue flax lily (Dianella caerulea) flowers in the garden; males rest overnight attached to plant stems. They are found in eastern Australia, from Queensland through New South Wales and into Victoria, and as well as New Guinea and the Aru Islands to the north.

The nest consists of several urn-shaped cells at the end of a 10 cm (4 in) long burrow, located in soil or earth, such as a creek bank in natural areas, or rubble in gardens, with some overhanging shelter. The cells themselves are 2 cm (0.8 in) long and lined with a waterproof material. A. bombiformis adds an egg to each with a food supply of pollen and nectar paste. Nesting individuals of species are stalked by the domino cuckoo bee (Thyreus lugubris), which hovers silently and observes before entering unattended burrows and laying its own egg, the grub of which consumes the supplies meant for A. bombiformis larvae.

== Interaction with other species ==
A research study published in 2010 by the Australian Journal of Entomology conducted research on the microbial pathogens that contribute to colony death among A. bombiformis, as well as other Australian bee species. They concluded that fungal microbial pathogens are a likely contributor to colony deaths among the various species. Through primarily spore germination, fungal pathogens may have been agents of the social evolution among Australian bee species.
