= Thyreus rotundatus =

Scientific classification
- Kingdom: Animalia
- Phylum: Arthropoda
- Clade: Pancrustacea
- Class: Insecta
- Order: Hymenoptera
- Family: Apidae
- Genus: Thyreus
- Species: T. rotundatus

Binomial name
- Thyreus rotundatus (Friese, 1905)

Synonyms
- Crocisa rotundata Friese, 1905; Crocisa albifrons Rayment, 1931

Species of bee

Thyreus rotundatus is a species of bee in the family Apidae and subfamily Apinae. It is endemic to Australia. It was described by German entomologist Heinrich Friese in 1905.

== Distribution and habitat ==
The species occurs in both western and eastern mainland Australia. Type localities include Landor Station in Western Australia and Mackay, Queensland.

== Behaviour ==
The adults are solitary flying mellivores. They are kleptoparasitic, probably on Amegilla species. Flowering plants visited by the bees include Loranthaceae species.
