= Thyreus insignis =

Scientific classification
- Kingdom: Animalia
- Phylum: Arthropoda
- Clade: Pancrustacea
- Class: Insecta
- Order: Hymenoptera
- Family: Apidae
- Genus: Thyreus
- Species: T. insignis

Binomial name
- Thyreus insignis (Meyer, 1921)

Synonyms
- Crocisa insignis Meyer, 1921

Species of bee

Thyreus insignis, is a species of bee belonging to the family Apidae subfamily Apinae.
