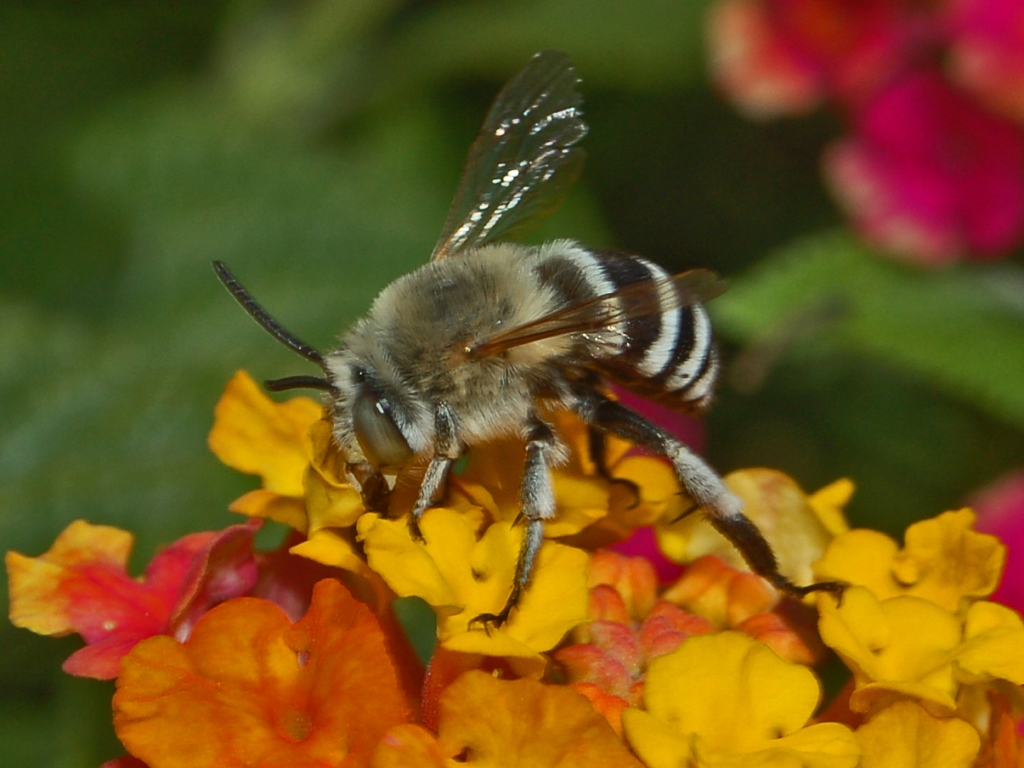

Scientific classification
- Kingdom: Animalia
- Phylum: Arthropoda
- Class: Insecta
- Order: Hymenoptera
- Family: Apidae
- Genus: Amegilla
- Species: A. quadrifasciata

Binomial name
- Amegilla quadrifasciata (Villers, 1789)

Synonyms
- Apis quadrifasciata de Villers, 1789; Anthophora quadrifasciata var albescens Dours, 1870; Anthophora maderae Sichel, 1868; Anthophora mervensis Radoszkowski, 1893; Anthophora mediterranea Alfken, 1927; Anthophora quadrifasciata var tenereffensis Cockerell, 1930; Anthophora klugi Priesner, 1957; Anthophora litorana Priesner, 1957

= Amegilla quadrifasciata =

Species of burrowing bee

Amegilla quadrifasciata, the white-banded digger bee, is a species of bee belonging to the family Apidae subfamily Apinae.

== Distribution ==
These bees have a wide distribution ranging from the Canary Islands in the west to Japan in the east. They are present in most of central and southern Europe, in central Asia and in North Africa.

== Description ==
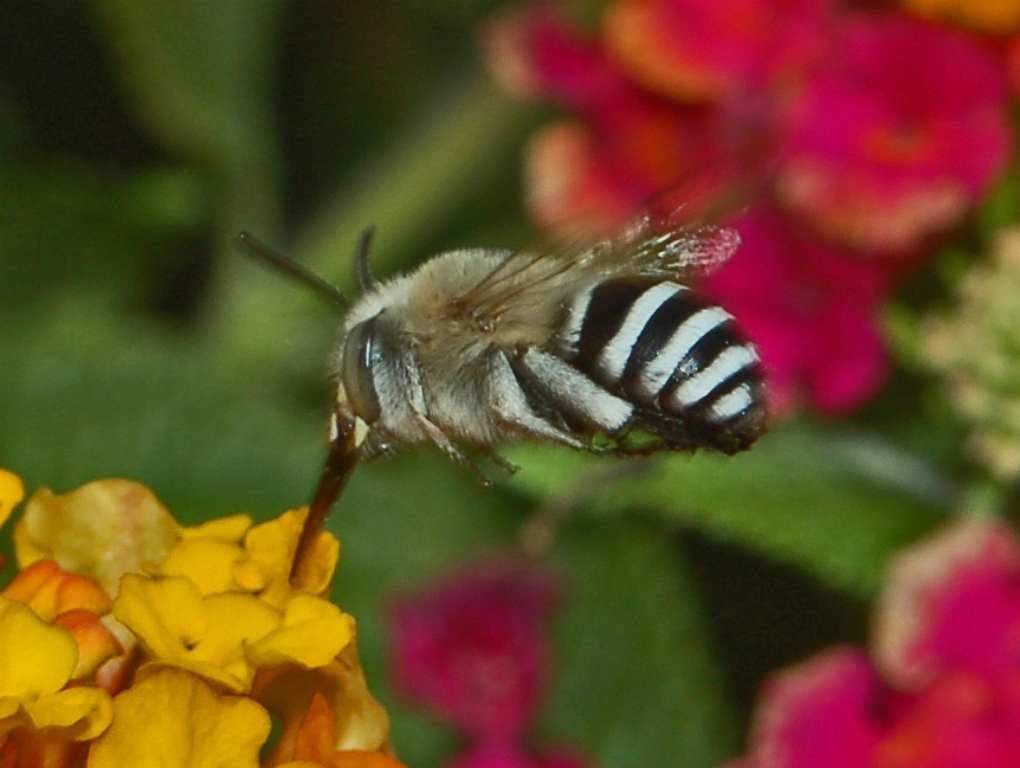
Amegilla quadrifasciata – In flight

Amegilla quadrifasciata grows up to 9–12 millimetres (0.35–0.47 in) long, The males are similar to the females. The thorax is orange-brown and densely hairy, while the abdomen alternate black and white transversal stripes. The face has a whitish drawing. The third antennal segment is about as long as the three following segments together. Scopa is white, but black at the front edge. Metatarsus on the hind legs is black haired. They have very large compound eyes and simple eyes between their antennae. Their long proboscises allow them to sip nectar from a variety of flowers and the hairy hind legs facilitate the collection and transport of pollen.

== Biology ==
Adults can be encountered from March to June, mainly feeding on Fabaceae (Alhagi kirghisorum, Medicago sativa), Lamiaceae (Ocimum species, Salvia species),Boraginaceae and Primulaceae species. They are solitary bees and do not form colonies, every female takes care of her own larvae. The females lay their eggs in nests in tunnels usually excavated by themselves in loose soils. In the cells they store pollen and nectar as food for the larvae. The larvae pupate in Autumn and emerge as adult bees in March.

== Bibliography ==
- Michener C.D., The Bees of the World, Johns Hopkins University Press, 2000, ISBN 0-8018-6133-0
- Felix Amiet, M. Herrmann, A. Müller, R. Neumeyer: Fauna Helvetica 20: Apidae 5. Centre Suisse de Cartographie de la Faune, 2007, ISBN 978-2-88414-032-4.
