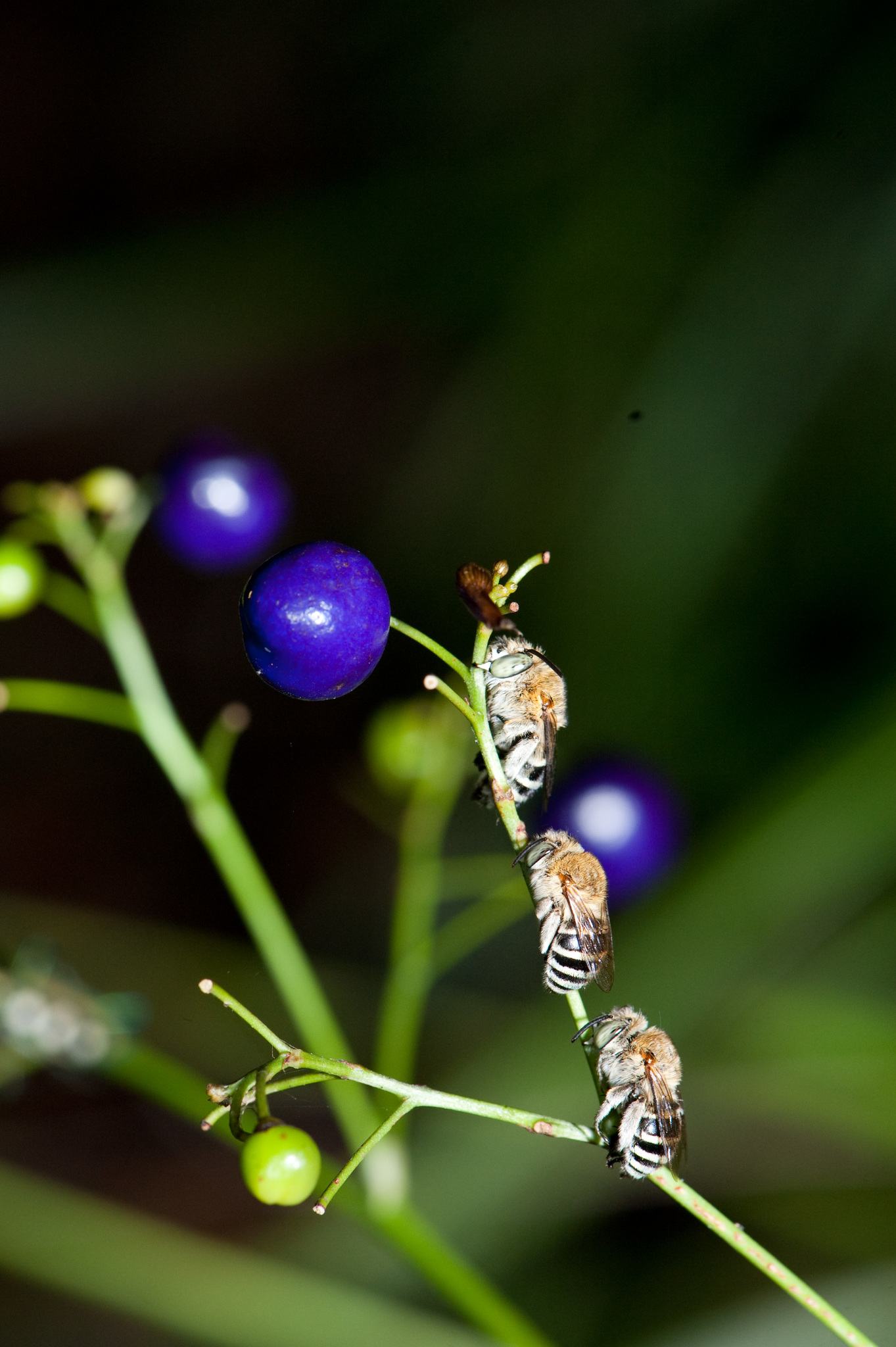
- Amegilla calceifera, Taiwan

Scientific classification
- Kingdom: Animalia
- Phylum: Arthropoda
- Clade: Pancrustacea
- Class: Insecta
- Order: Hymenoptera
- Family: Apidae
- Genus: Amegilla
- Species: A. calceifera

Binomial name
- Amegilla calceifera (Cockerell, 1911)

Synonyms
- Anthophora calceifera Cockerell, 1911; Anthophora calceifera tainana Strand, 1913

= Amegilla calceifera =

Species of bee

Amegilla calceifera is a species of anthophorine bee in the family Apidae. It is found in southern and temperate Asia. Adult bees are pollinators of Alpinia nieuwenhuizii flowers.

Amegilla calceifera is known for its rapid and agile flight, allowing it to hover near flowers while foraging for nectar and pollen. Unlike social honey bees, Amegilla calceifera is generally solitary, and females usually build nests in the ground. They construct cells for their offspring and provision them with pollen and nectar. A study conducted West Bengal, India documented its activity in various crop environments, highlighting its importance in agriculture.
