= Thyreus ramosellus =

Scientific classification
- Kingdom: Animalia
- Phylum: Arthropoda
- Clade: Pancrustacea
- Class: Insecta
- Order: Hymenoptera
- Family: Apidae
- Genus: Thyreus
- Species: T. ramosellus

Binomial name
- Thyreus ramosellus (Cockerell, 1919)

Species of bee

Thyreus ramosellus, is a species of bee belonging to the family Apidae subfamily Apinae.

T. ramosellus is a solitary bee species, with a range spanning from south eastern Europe to southern Asia.
