= Thyreus garouensis =

Scientific classification
- Kingdom: Animalia
- Phylum: Arthropoda
- Clade: Pancrustacea
- Class: Insecta
- Order: Hymenoptera
- Family: Apidae
- Genus: Thyreus
- Species: T. garouensis

Binomial name
- Thyreus garouensis Engel, 2014

Species of bee

Thyreus garouensis is a cleptoparasitic species of bee from Northern Cameroon in Central Africa. It belongs to the genus of Thyreus, whose members are often referred to as cuckoo bees, and to the family Apidae.
