= Thyreus tinctus =

Scientific classification
- Kingdom: Animalia
- Phylum: Arthropoda
- Clade: Pancrustacea
- Class: Insecta
- Order: Hymenoptera
- Family: Apidae
- Genus: Thyreus
- Species: T. tinctus

Binomial name
- Thyreus tinctus (Cockerell, 1905)

Synonyms
- Crocisa tincta Cockerell, 1905

Species of bee

Thyreus tinctus, is a species of bee in the family Apidae and subfamily Apinae. It is endemic to Australia. It was described by British-American entomologist Theodore Dru Alison Cockerell in 1905.

== Description ==
Female body length is about 15 mm. Integumental colouration is mainly black, with lighter, white to pale blue markings; the hair is white.

== Distribution and habitat ==
The species occurs in eastern Australia. The type locality is Toowoomba in south-eastern Queensland.

== Behaviour ==
The adults are flying mellivores.
