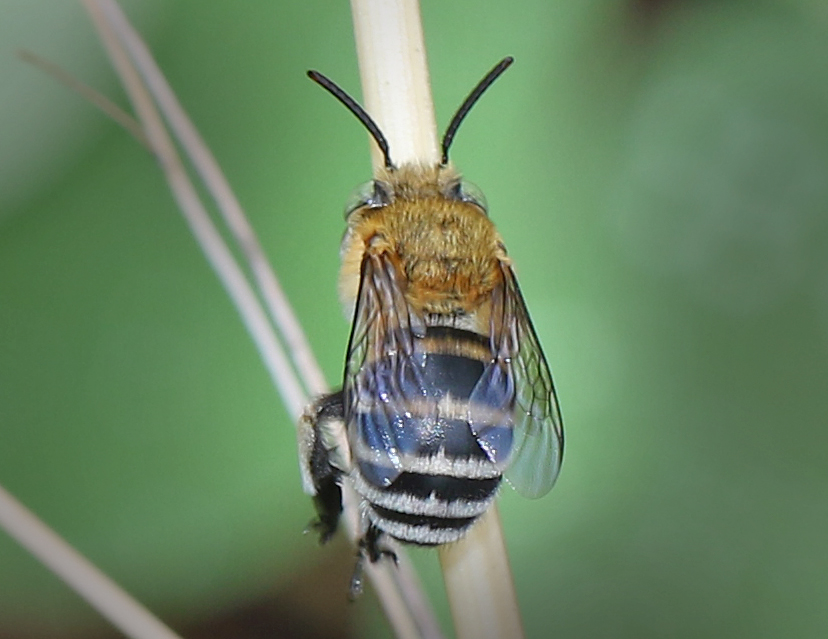

Scientific classification
- Kingdom: Animalia
- Phylum: Arthropoda
- Class: Insecta
- Order: Hymenoptera
- Family: Apidae
- Genus: Amegilla
- Subgenus: Zonamegilla
- Species: A. zonata

Binomial name
- Amegilla zonata (Linnaeus, 1758 )

Synonyms
- Apis zonata Linnaeus, 1758

= Amegilla zonata =

Species of blue-banded bee

Amegilla zonata is a species of blue-banded bees belonging to the family Apidae, widely distributed in Southeast Asia, where it is often confused with the Australian species Amegilla cingulata.
