= Thyreus takaonis =

Scientific classification
- Kingdom: Animalia
- Phylum: Arthropoda
- Clade: Pancrustacea
- Class: Insecta
- Order: Hymenoptera
- Family: Apidae
- Genus: Thyreus
- Species: T. takaonis

Binomial name
- Thyreus takaonis (Cockerell, 1911)

Synonyms
- Crocisa takaonis Cockerell, 1911 Crocisa ramosa var reepeni Friese, 1918

Species of bee

Thyreus takaonis, is a species of bee belonging to the family Apidae subfamily Apinae.
