= Thyreus sicarius =

Scientific classification
- Kingdom: Animalia
- Phylum: Arthropoda
- Clade: Pancrustacea
- Class: Insecta
- Order: Hymenoptera
- Family: Apidae
- Genus: Thyreus
- Species: T. sicarius

Binomial name
- Thyreus sicarius Lieftinck, 1962

Species of bee

Thyreus sicarius is a species of bee in the family Apidae and subfamily Apinae. It is endemic to Australia. It was described by Dutch entomologist Maurits Lieftinck in 1962.

== Description ==
Female body length is 15–16 mm, forewing 11.3 mm. Integumental colouration is mainly black; the hair is both white and black.

== Distribution and habitat ==
The species occurs in Western Australia. A paratype was collected on Belele Station in the Murchison region of Western Australia.

== Behaviour ==
The adults are solitary flying mellivores.
