= Thyreus rufitarsus =

Scientific classification
- Kingdom: Animalia
- Phylum: Arthropoda
- Clade: Pancrustacea
- Class: Insecta
- Order: Hymenoptera
- Family: Apidae
- Genus: Thyreus
- Species: T. rufitarsus

Binomial name
- Thyreus rufitarsus (Rayment, 1931)

Synonyms
- Crocisa rufitarsus Rayment, 1931

Species of bee

Thyreus rufitarsus is a species of bee in the family Apidae and subfamily Apinae. It is endemic to Australia. It was described by Australian entomologist Tarlton Rayment in 1931.

== Description ==
Male body length is about 9 mm. Integumental colouration is mainly black, with some bluish-green markings.

== Distribution and habitat ==
The exact type locality and collector are unknown, but, as the specimen is in the collection of the WA Department of Agriculture, it was presumably collected in Western Australia.

== Behaviour ==
The adults are flying mellivores.
