= Thyreus abdominalis =

Scientific classification
- Kingdom: Animalia
- Phylum: Arthropoda
- Clade: Pancrustacea
- Class: Insecta
- Order: Hymenoptera
- Family: Apidae
- Genus: Thyreus
- Species: T. abdominalis

Binomial name
- Thyreus abdominalis (Friese, 1905)

Species of bee

Thyreus abdominalis is a species of bee belonging to the genus Thyreus, the members of which are often referred to as cuckoo bees. Like all bees in this genus, it is kleptoparasitic. It is found throughout southern and eastern Asia.

== Range ==
T. abdominalis is widespread, having been recorded throughout the Himalayan states to eastern China, Malaysia, and Indonesia.

== Taxonomy ==
There are four subspecies of T. abdominalis. These are:

- T. abdominalis abdominalis
- T. abdominalis austrosunsanus
- T. abdominalis rostratus
- T. abdominalis simulator
