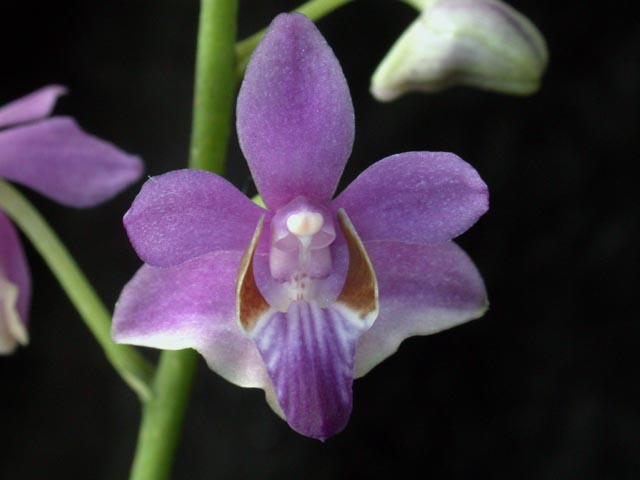
- Flower of Phalaenopsis pulcherrima

Scientific classification
- Kingdom: Plantae
- Clade: Tracheophytes
- Clade: Angiosperms
- Clade: Monocots
- Order: Asparagales
- Family: Orchidaceae
- Subfamily: Epidendroideae
- Genus: Phalaenopsis
- Species: P. pulcherrima

Binomial name
- Phalaenopsis pulcherrima (Lindl.) J.J.Sm.

Varieties
- Phalaenopsis pulcherrima var. apiculata (Aver.) O.Gruss & W.E.Higgins; Phalaenopsis pulcherrima var. marmorata (O.Gruss) O.Gruss & W.E.Higgins; Phalaenopsis pulcherrima var. pulcherrima; Phalaenopsis pulcherrima var. regnieriana (Rchb.f.) O.Gruss & W.E.Higgins

Synonyms
- Doritis pulcherrima Lindl. (basionym); Phalaenopsis esmeralda Rchb.f.; Phalaenopsis esmeralda var. albiflora Rchb.f.; Phalaenopsis antennifera Rchb.f.; Doritis pulcherrima var. caerulea Fowlie; Doritis pulcherrima f. alba O.Gruss & Roeth; Doritis pulcherrima f. albiflora (Rchb.f.) Roeth & O.Gruss; Doritis pulcherrima f. caerulea (Fowlie) O.Gruss & Roeth; Phalaenopsis pulcherrima f. alba (O.Gruss & Roeth) Christenson; Phalaenopsis pulcherrima f. albiflora (Rchb.f.) Christenson; Phalaenopsis pulcherrima f. caerulea (Fowlie) Christenson

= Phalaenopsis pulcherrima =

Species of orchid

Phalaenopsis pulcherrima is a species of orchid found from Hainan Island to western Malesia.

== Ecology ==
=== Pollination ===
Pollination through bees, specifically Amegilla nigritar, Amegilla zonata, and Nomia punctulata has been reported. This species employs a deceptive pollination strategy. The orchid does not provide rewards to pollinators. It benefits from blooming in the same period as rewarding species. Amegilla is the most important pollinator, but other diurnal insects, such as four species of bees, two species of butterflies, one species of moth and two other unidentified insects, have also been observed to interact with the flowers.

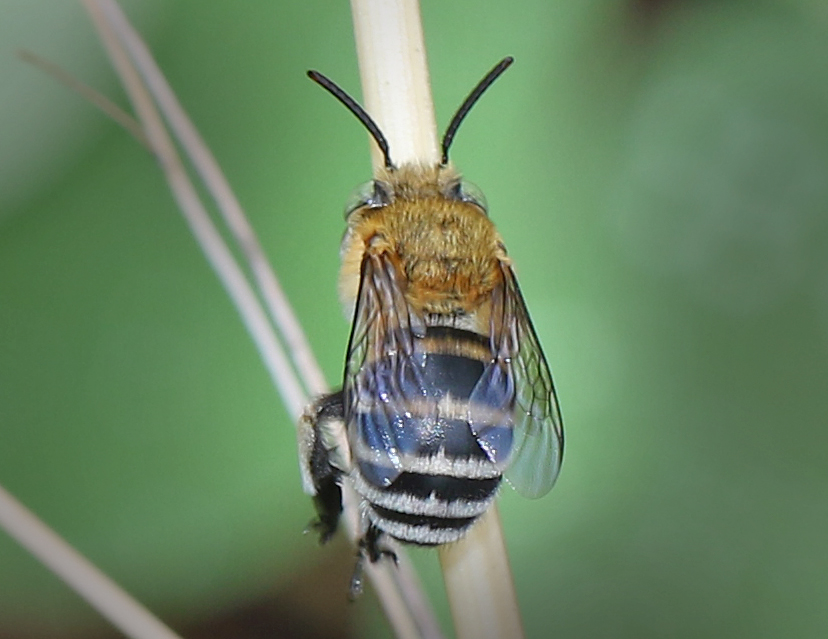
Amegilla zonata, a known pollinator

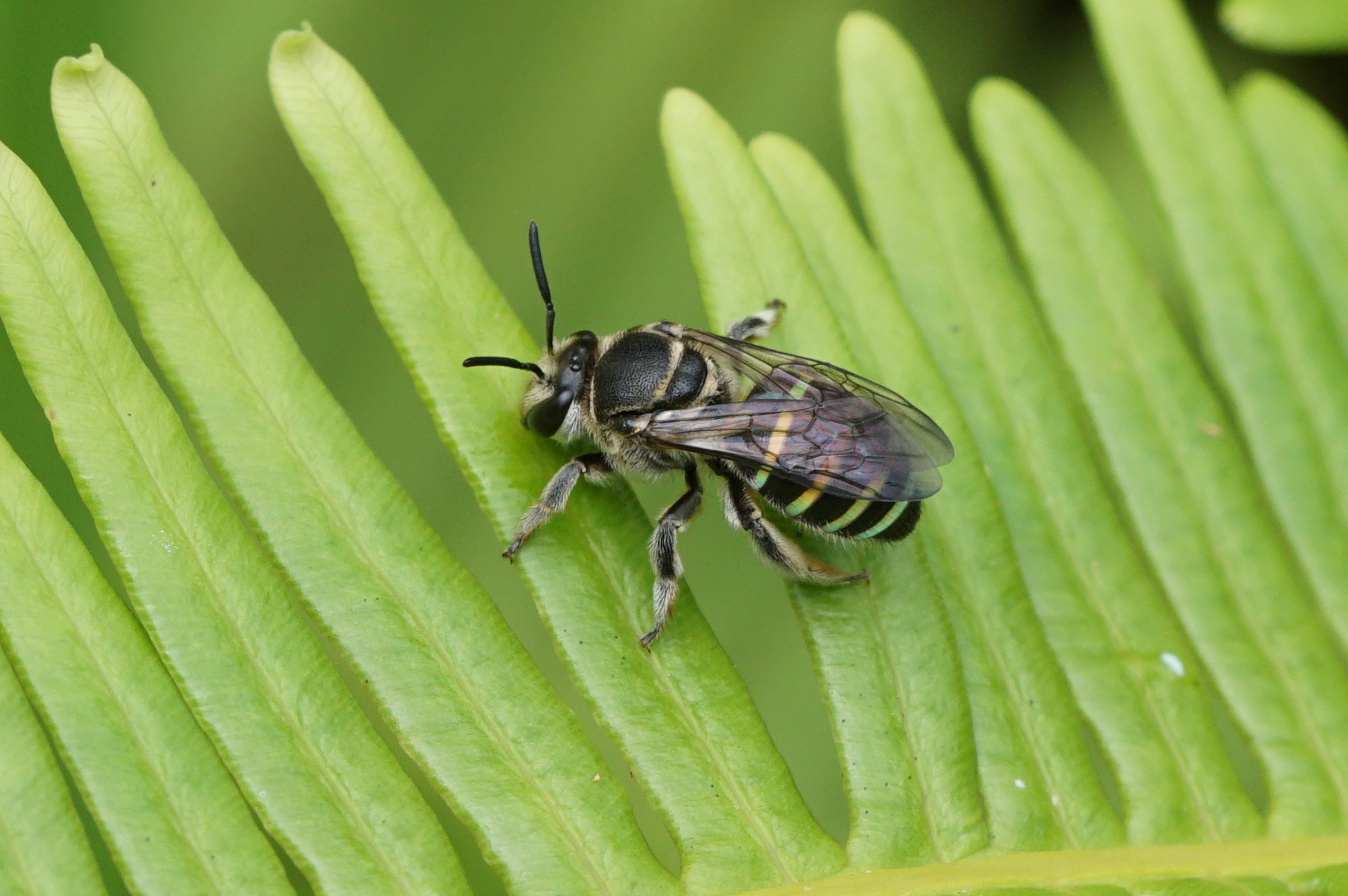
Nomia sp. - bees of this genus are known pollinators (namely Nomia punctulata)
