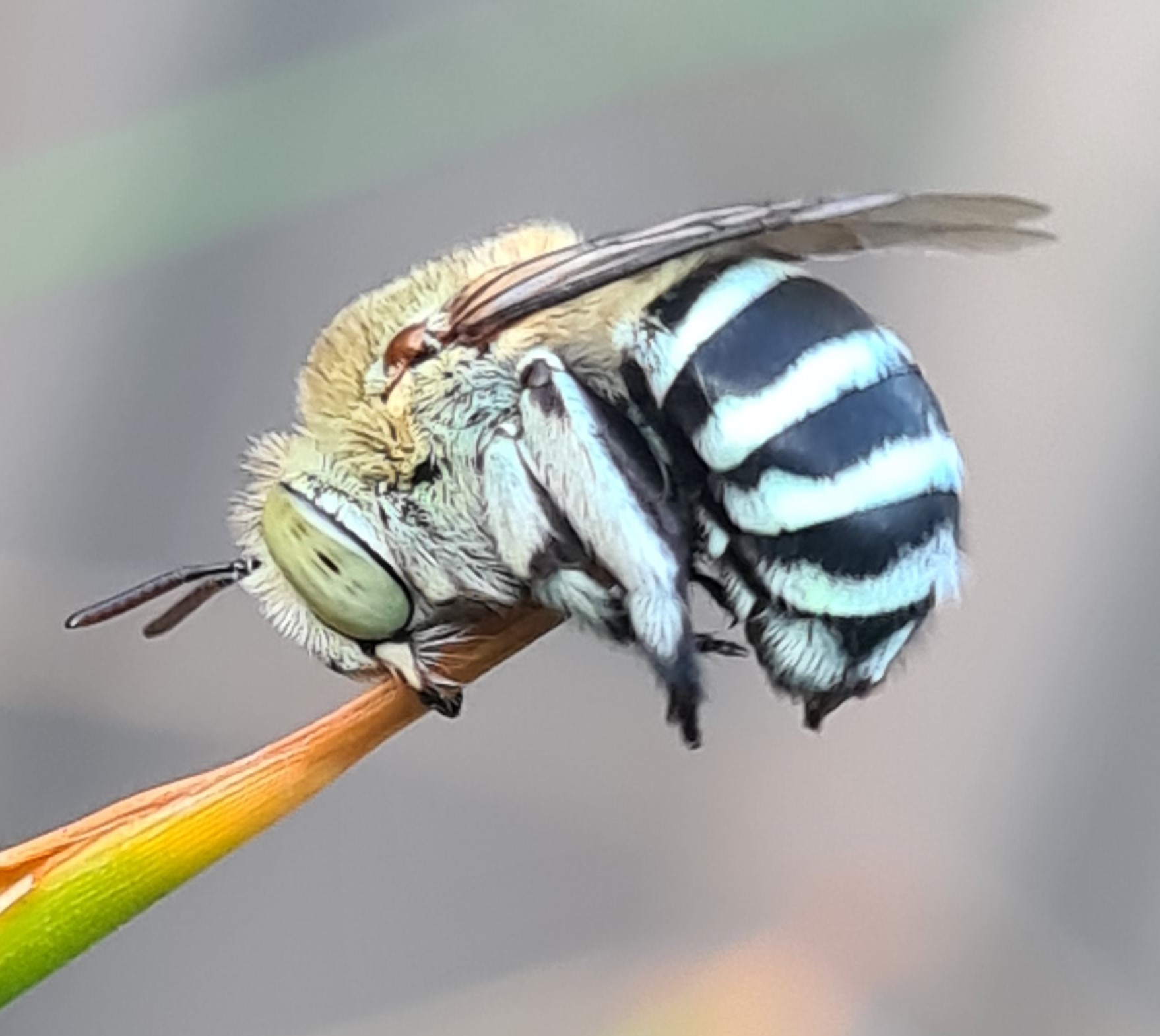
- Amegilla chlorocyanea female

Scientific classification
- Kingdom: Animalia
- Phylum: Arthropoda
- Clade: Pancrustacea
- Class: Insecta
- Order: Hymenoptera
- Family: Apidae
- Genus: Amegilla
- Subgenus: Notomegilla

= Notomegilla =

Bee

Notomegilla is a subgenus of the bee genus Amegilla. It comprises two species – Amegilla chlorocyanea from southern and arid Australia, and Amegilla aeruginosa from northern Australia and Papua New Guinea. Both species share the characteristic feature of blue-green iridescent hairs on the legs.
