= Thyreus ceylonicus =

Scientific classification
- Kingdom: Animalia
- Phylum: Arthropoda
- Clade: Pancrustacea
- Class: Insecta
- Order: Hymenoptera
- Family: Apidae
- Genus: Thyreus
- Species: T. ceylonicus

Binomial name
- Thyreus ceylonicus (Friese, 1905)

Synonyms
- Crocisa ceylonica Friese, 1905; Crocisa lilacina Cockerell, 1919; Crocisa angulifera Cockerell, 1919; Crocisa nitidula ceylonica Friese, 1905; Crocisa nitidula forma andamanensis Meyer, 1921; Crocisa nitidula forma bimaculata Meyer, 1921

Species of bee

Thyreus ceylonicus is a species of bee belonging to the family Apidae in subfamily Apinae. The subspecies are:

- T. c. andamanensis (Meyer, 1921)
- T. c. angulifer (Cockerell, 1919)
- T. c. dives Lieftinck, 1962
- T. c. lampides Lieftinck, 1962
- T. c. lilacinus (Cockerell, 1919)
- T. c. locuples Lieftinck, 1962
- T. c. nereis Lieftinck, 1962
