= Thyreus surniculus =

Scientific classification
- Kingdom: Animalia
- Phylum: Arthropoda
- Clade: Pancrustacea
- Class: Insecta
- Order: Hymenoptera
- Family: Apidae
- Genus: Thyreus
- Species: T. surniculus

Binomial name
- Thyreus surniculus Lieftinck, 1959

Species of bee

Thyreus surniculus, is a species of bee belonging to the family Apidae subfamily Apinae. It is found in India, Sri Lanka and occasionally Pakistan.
