= Thyreus elegans =

Scientific classification
- Kingdom: Animalia
- Phylum: Arthropoda
- Clade: Pancrustacea
- Class: Insecta
- Order: Hymenoptera
- Family: Apidae
- Genus: Thyreus
- Species: T. elegans

Binomial name
- Thyreus elegans (Morawitz, 1878)

Synonyms
- Crocisa brezzii; Crocisa elegans F Morawitz, 1877; Crocisa quadridentata

Species of bee

Thyreus elegans is a species of bee in the subfamily Apinae. It is found in Eurasia and Africa.
