= Thyreus histrio =

Scientific classification
- Kingdom: Animalia
- Phylum: Arthropoda
- Clade: Pancrustacea
- Class: Insecta
- Order: Hymenoptera
- Family: Apidae
- Genus: Thyreus
- Species: T. histrio

Binomial name
- Thyreus histrio (Fabricius, 1775)

Synonyms
- Crocisa minuta Radoszkowski, 1893; Crocisa chionotricha Cockerell, 1919; Crocisa rectangula Meyer, 1921

Species of bee

Thyreus histrio, is a species of bee belonging to the family Apidae subfamily Apinae.
