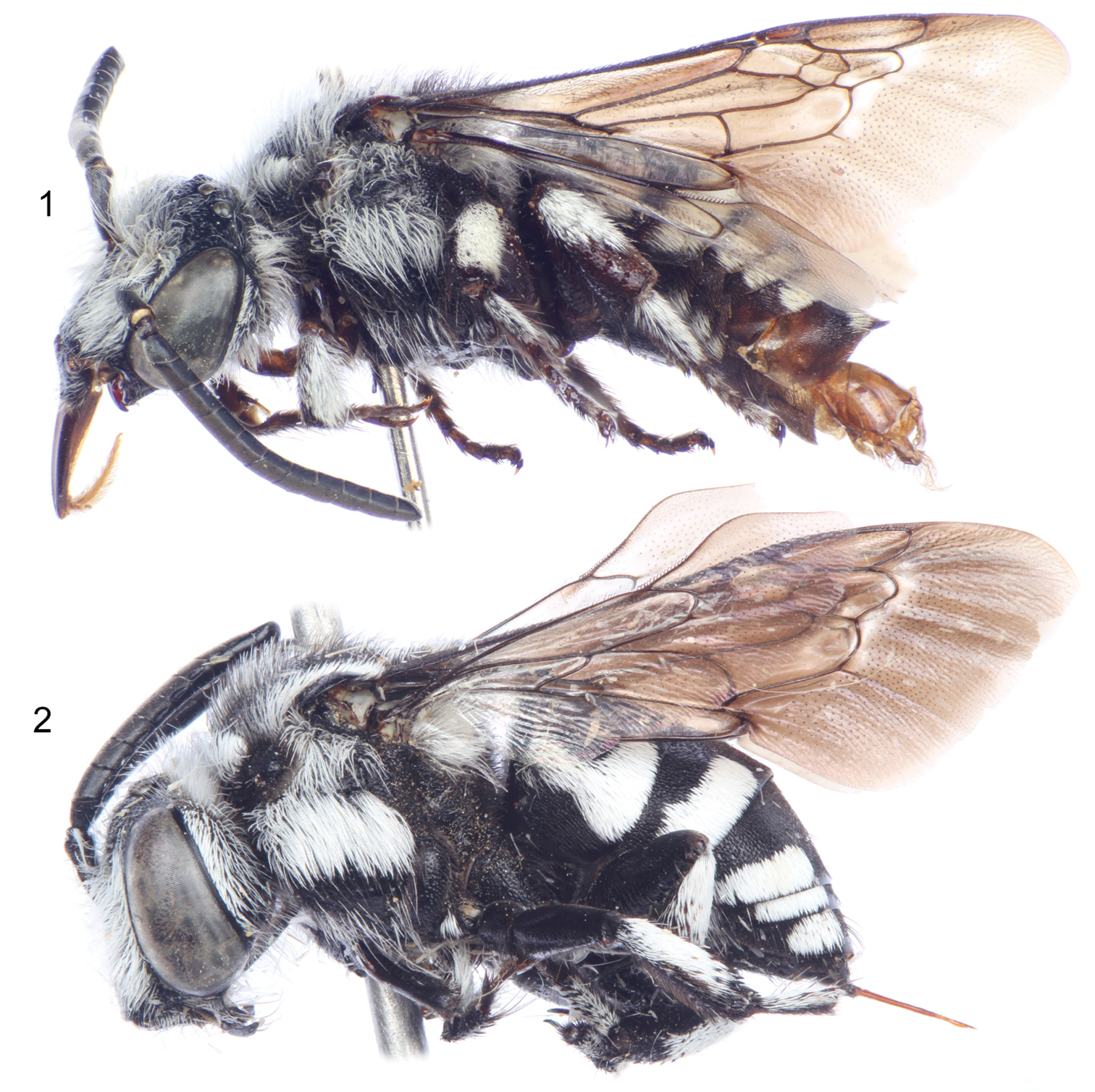
- Male (holotype) at top and female (paratype) at bottom

Scientific classification
- Kingdom: Animalia
- Phylum: Arthropoda
- Clade: Pancrustacea
- Class: Insecta
- Order: Hymenoptera
- Family: Apidae
- Genus: Thyreus
- Species: T. shebicus

Binomial name
- Thyreus shebicus Engel 2014

= Thyreus shebicus =

Species of bee

Thyreus shebicus is a species of kleptoparisitic bee belonging to the genus Thyreus in the family Apidae. It is found in northern Yemen and southwestern Saudi Arabia.
