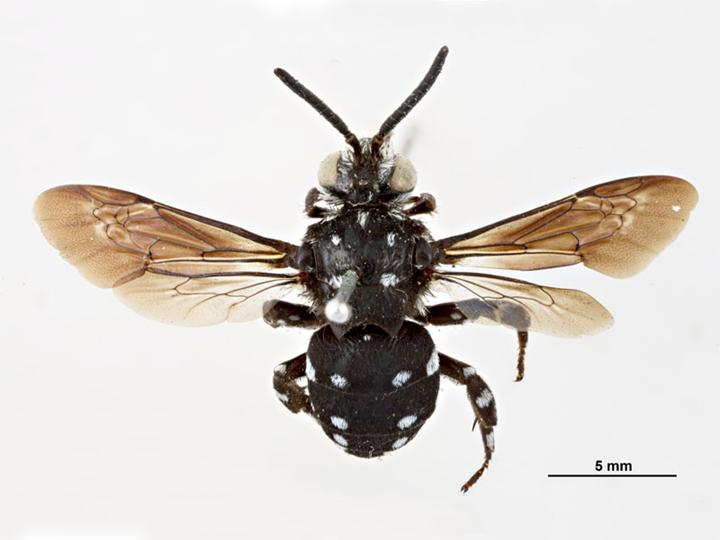
- Female

Scientific classification
- Kingdom: Animalia
- Phylum: Arthropoda
- Clade: Pancrustacea
- Class: Insecta
- Order: Hymenoptera
- Family: Apidae
- Genus: Thyreus
- Species: T. lugubris

Binomial name
- Thyreus lugubris (Smith, 1879)

= Thyreus lugubris =

Species of bee

Thyreus lugubris, common name the domino cuckoo bee, is a species of Australian native bee belonging to the family Apidae, subfamily Apinae.

== Behaviour ==
As with the other bees in this genus, T. lugubris is kleptoparasitic. The hosts for Thyreus are bees of the genus Amegilla. Thyreus lugubris specifically targets the teddy bear bee, Amegilla bombiformis.

Females may be seen flying close to the ground searching for a host nest. Once a suitable nest is found, the female will enter it while the host parent is absent and bite a hole through the cap of a recently closed cell. It then places its abdomen through the hole and lays an egg close to the host egg before repairing the breach to the cell.
