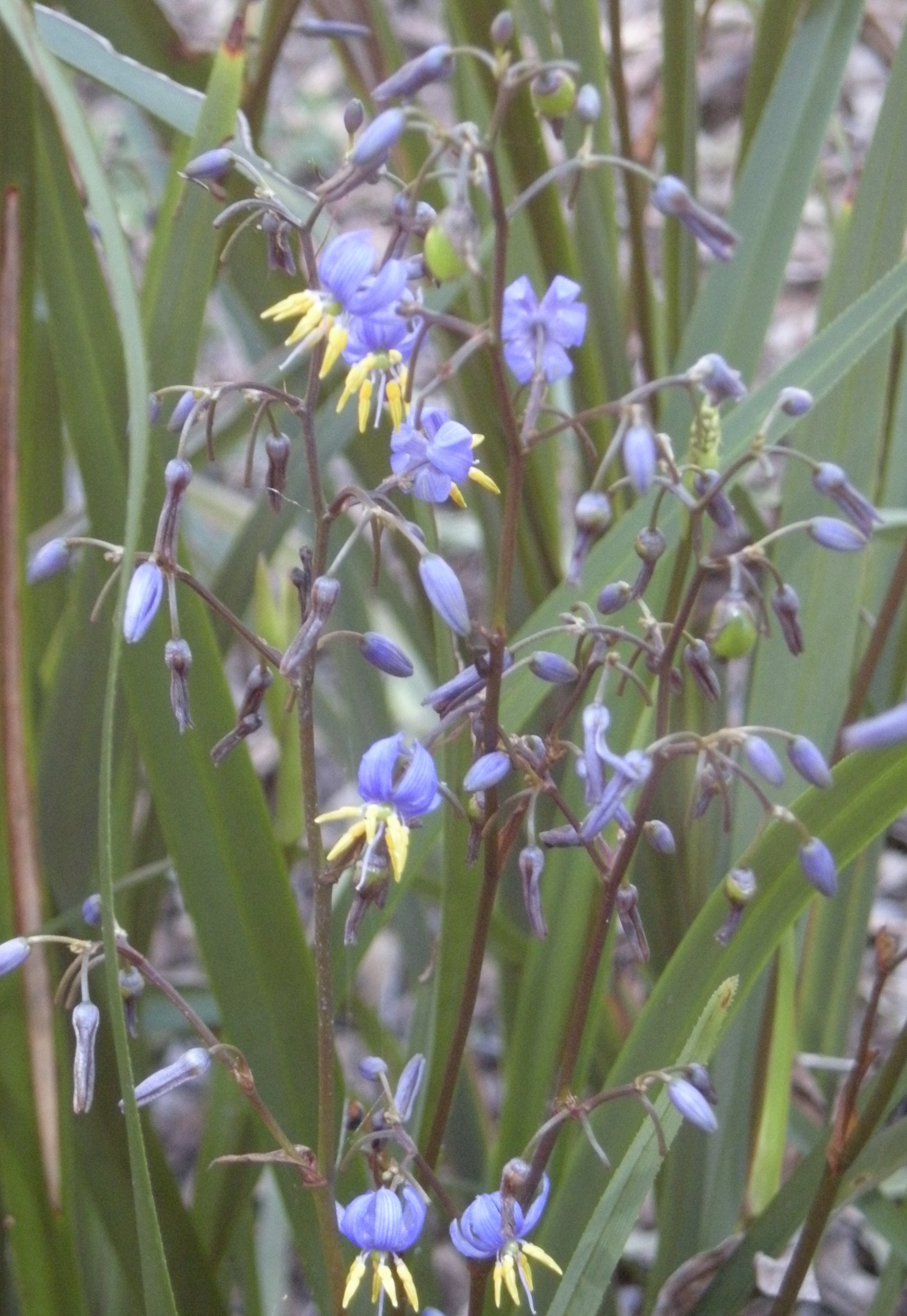
- At Mount Archer National Park, Queensland

Scientific classification
- Kingdom: Plantae
- Clade: Tracheophytes
- Clade: Angiosperms
- Clade: Monocots
- Order: Asparagales
- Family: Asphodelaceae
- Subfamily: Hemerocallidoideae
- Genus: Dianella
- Species: D. caerulea

Binomial name
- Dianella caerulea Sims

= Dianella caerulea =

Species of flowering plant

Dianella caerulea, commonly known as the blue flax-lily, blueberry lily, or paroo lily, is a perennial herb of the family Asphodelaceae, subfamily Hemerocallidoideae, found across the eastern states of Australia and Tasmania. It is a hardy plant, growing to a height and width of around 1 metre with grass-like strappy leaves. Blue flowers in spring and summer are followed by indigo-coloured berries. It adapts readily to cultivation and is commonly seen in Australian gardens and amenities plantings.

== Taxonomy ==
It was first described by English taxonomist John Sims in Curtis's Botanical Magazine in 1802. Its specific name is the Latin adjective caerulea "blue". The genus name is derived from the Roman goddess Diana, with a diminutive suffix -ella.

Dianella caerulea is highly variable species, with many forms found throughout eastern Australia. Six varieties are known from the Sydney district alone.

The species is described as having seven varieties, having been revised by Queensland botanist Rod Henderson in 1987 for the Flora of Australia:

- Dianella caerulea var. assera grows as a taller solitary tufted plant to 1.8 m high, and is found from Nowra north along the New South Wales coast and Blue Mountains into Queensland.
- Dianella caerulea var. caerulea
- Dianella caerulea var. cinerascens is a pale-grey leaved form to 0.8 m inland and north of the Sydney Basin, from Putty northwest to Wollar.
- Dianella caerulea var. petasmatodes is a more mat-forming variant, which reaches 2 m in diameter and 1.3 m high. It is found on the far north coast of New South Wales into Queensland.
- Dianella caerulea var. producta is a taller variety to 1.3 m found from Nowra and Blackheath north through New South Wales and into Queensland. It has a greenish white to blue perianth.
- Dianella caerulea var. protensa is a smaller variant up to 0.5 m high, which grows as a solitary tuft. It is found from Nowra northwards through New South Wales into Queensland. It is found in sclerophyll forest on sandy soils.
- Dianella caerulea var. vannata is a taller variant to 1.3 m recorded from the Blue Mountains, the far north coast of New South Wales and Queensland.

== Description ==
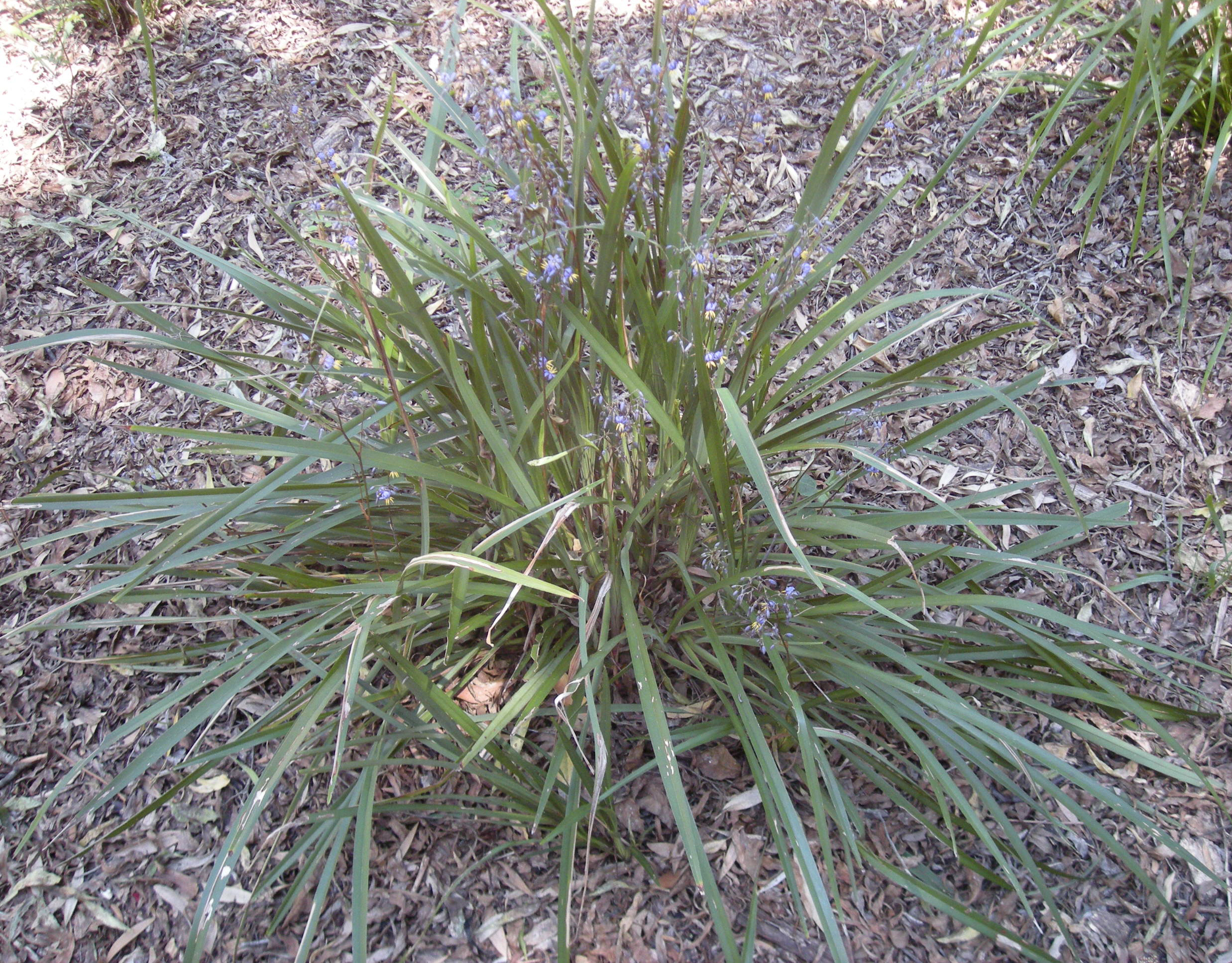
Habit

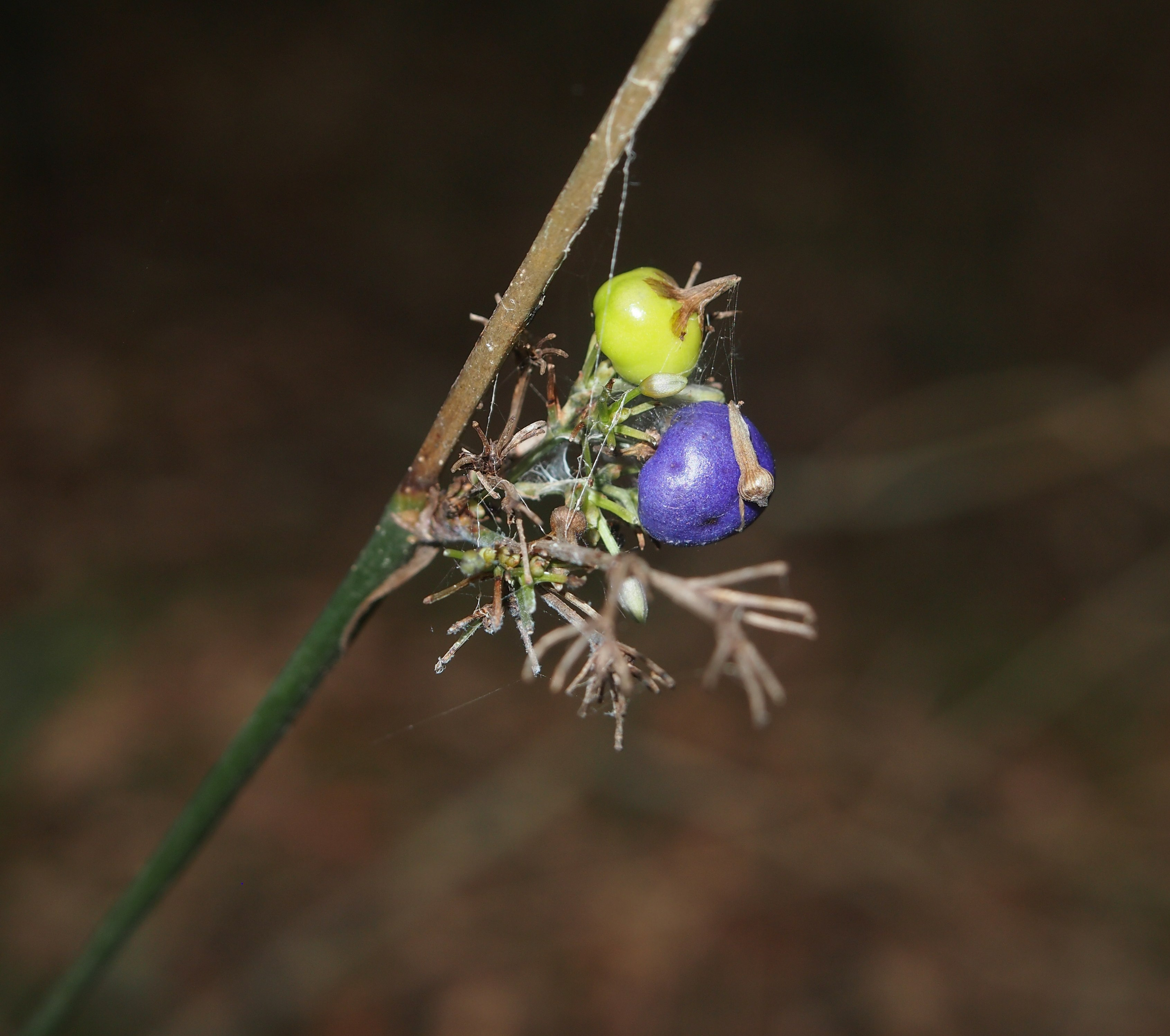
Fruit

Dianella caerulea is a strappy herbaceous fruit bearing plant to about 1 metre (3 ft) high, with a thick spreading rhizome under the ground. The bright green leaves have straight or toothed margins, and may reach 75 cm (30 in) in length and 0.3-2.5 cm wide. The small (1-1.6 cm diameter) flowers bloom in spring and summer (August to January); the perianth is pale to a dark blue, or green-blue, and the anthers at the centre are yellowy brown. These are followed by small roughly spherical indigo-coloured berries which range from about 0.7 to 1.2 cm (0.3-0.5 in) in diameter. These fruit are edible.

== Distribution and habitat ==
The plant is distributed through a range in Australian Capital Territory, Victoria, New South Wales, Tasmania, and Queensland. It occurs in a wide range of habitats, from coastal heathland and even sand dunes.

Dianella caerulea has been introduced to Oahu, Hawaii.

== Cultivation ==
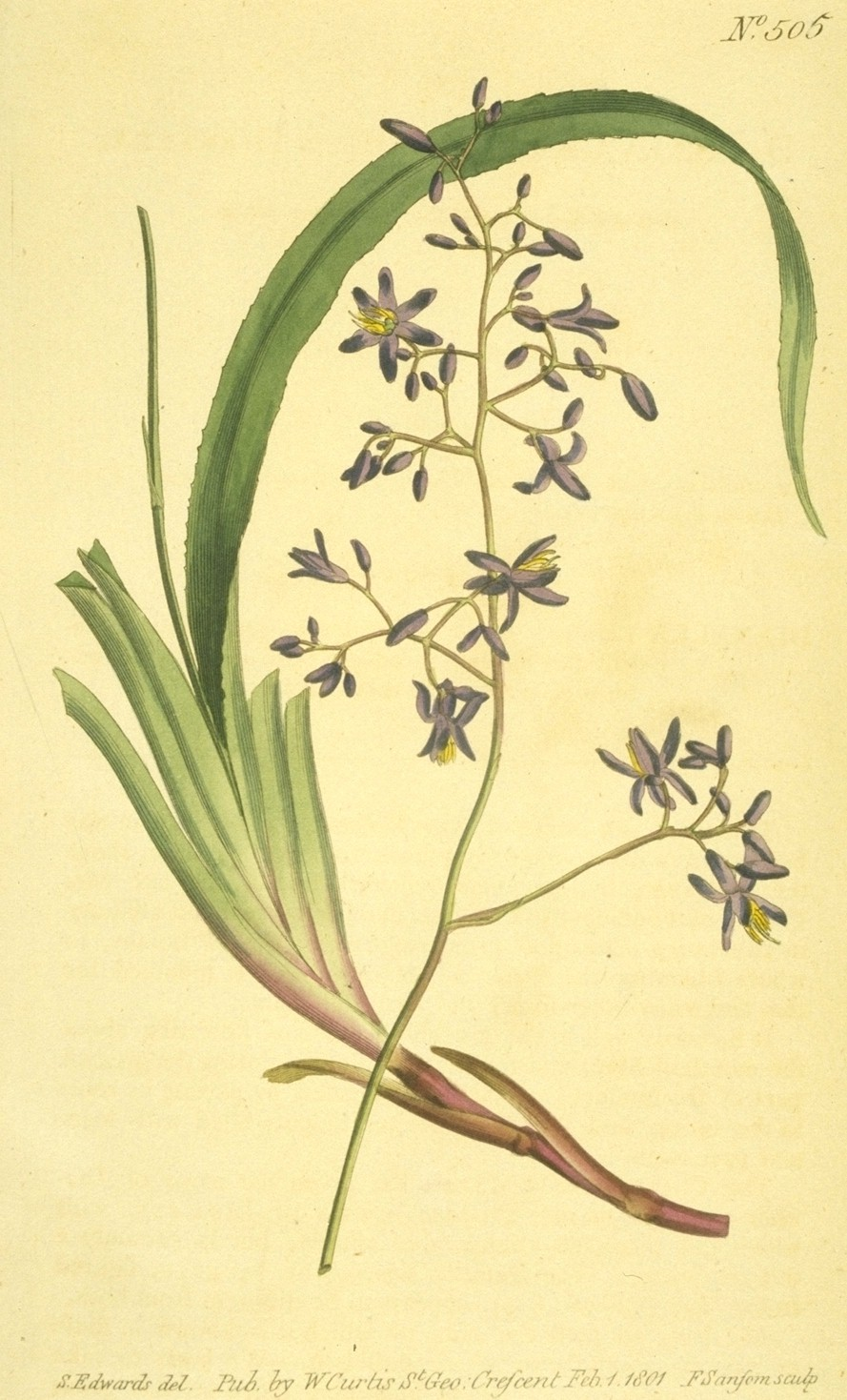
Image in Curtis' The Botanical Magazine

Believed to have been first propagated in England in 1783, Dianella caerulea is commonly cultivated in gardens, and is sometimes seen as a low-hedging plant in public spaces and amenities plantings. It is very hardy and long-lived, and suitable for rockeries. It is tolerant of poor drainage and responds well to extra moisture. Plants attract fruit-eating birds and butterflies in garden settings. The smaller denser forms in particular have potential for small gardens.

== Plant Hardiness ==
Dianella caerulea is a very hardy (snow and frost hardy) and long-lived plant once established. It can tolerate damp conditions but prefers moist well drained soil. It adapts readily to cultivation.
