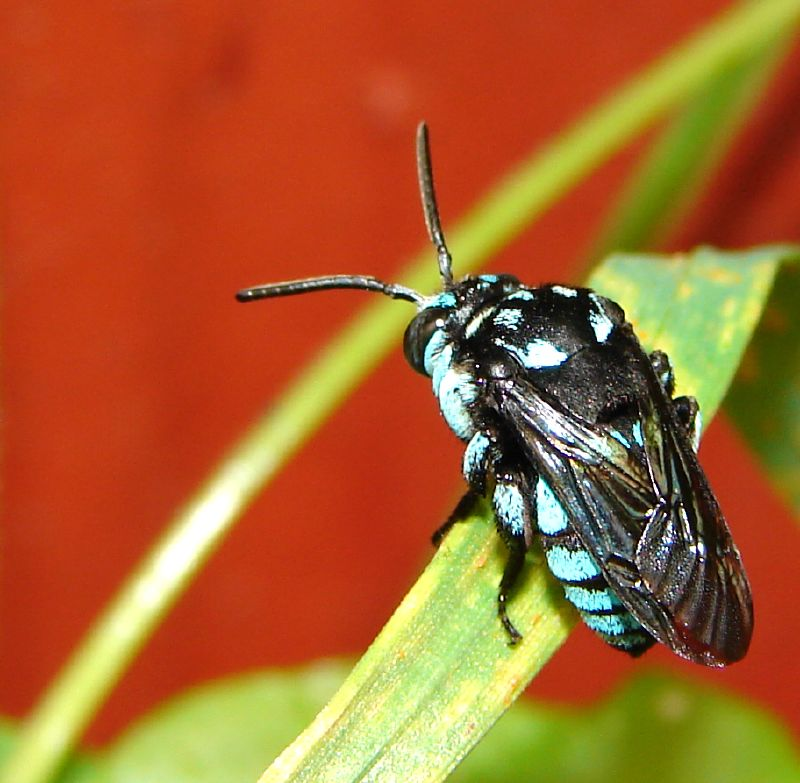

Scientific classification
- Kingdom: Animalia
- Phylum: Arthropoda
- Clade: Pancrustacea
- Class: Insecta
- Order: Hymenoptera
- Family: Apidae
- Genus: Thyreus
- Species: T. nitidulus

Binomial name
- Thyreus nitidulus (Fabricius, 1804)

= Thyreus nitidulus =

Species of bee

Thyreus nitidulus, commonly known as the neon cuckoo bee, is a parasitic bee of the genus Thyreus, called cuckoo bees. It is a stocky bee, notable for its brilliant metallic blue- and black-banded colors.

Originally described by Danish entomologist Johan Christian Fabricius in 1804 as Melecta nitidula – from a collection in the Aru Islands or northern Australia – it was given its current scientific name Thyreus nitidulus in 1959 by M. A. Lieftinck. The specific epithet is derived from the diminutive of the Latin adjective nitidus "shining" (i.e. "little shiny one").

Several subspecies are known - the nominate race T. n. nitidulus is found across eastern and northern Australia, specifically New South Wales, Queensland, South Australia, and the Northern Territory, as well as New Guinea. Other species are found in Southeast Asia.

Like all bees, the neon cuckoo bee is covered by furry, branched, flattened hair, which is responsible for both the black and blue colours. Pale blue hair covers much of the face on the head, as well as patches on the sides of the thorax and the legs. The abdomen is striped with bright blue and black, and the transparent wings are purple-tinged brown in colour. The bee is sturdy in build, with a reinforced thorax.

The female neon cuckoo bee seeks out the burrow nests of the blue-banded bee (Amegilla cingulata), and lays an egg into a partly completed brood cell while it is unguarded. The larval cuckoo bee then consumes the larder and later emerges from the cell.
