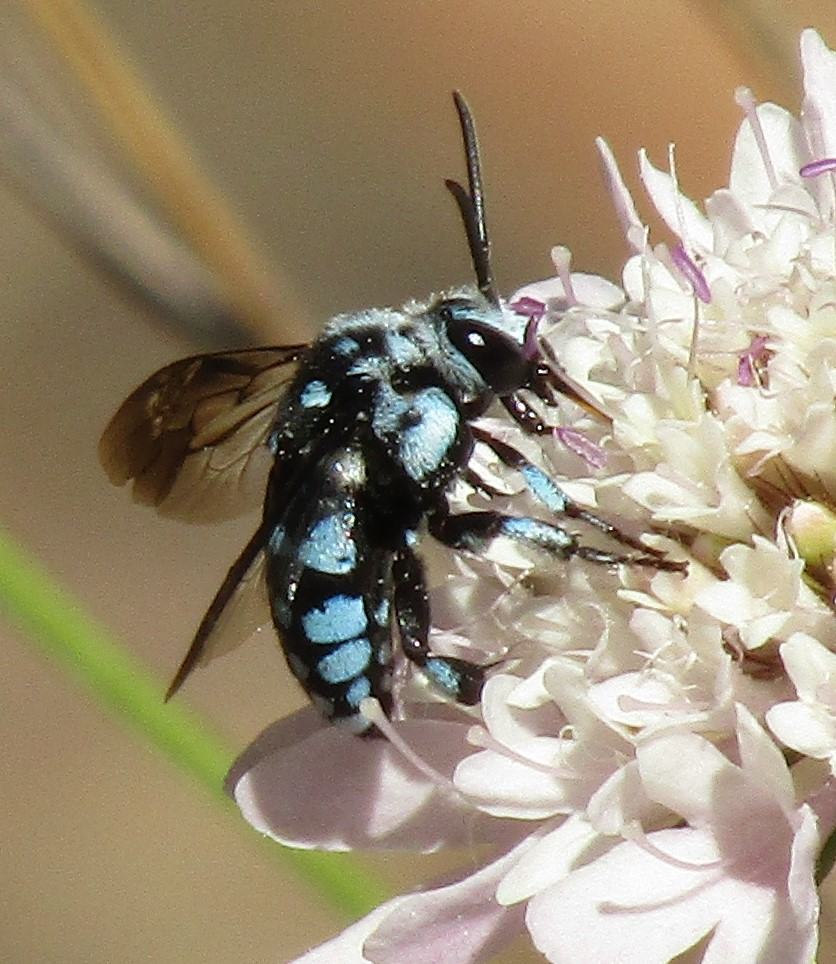

Scientific classification
- Kingdom: Animalia
- Phylum: Arthropoda
- Clade: Pancrustacea
- Class: Insecta
- Order: Hymenoptera
- Family: Apidae
- Genus: Thyreus
- Species: T. caeruleopunctatus

Binomial name
- Thyreus caeruleopunctatus Blanchard 1840

= Thyreus caeruleopunctatus =

Species of bee

The chequered cuckoo bee (Thyreus caeruleopunctatus) is a species of bee native to Australia and New Guinea. A member of the family Apidae, it was described by Émile Blanchard in 1840. It is mostly black, with pale blue markings on the abdomen, thorax, legs and head, and smoky-coloured wings. This species is kleptoparasitic on species of the Amegilla genus, including Amegilla pulchra.

== Taxonomy ==
The chequered cuckoo bee was first described by French zoologist and entomologist Émile Blanchard, who named it Crocisa caeruleopunctata in 1840. It has also been known as Crocisa australensis and Crocisa lamprosoma. In the late 1950s to early 1960s, these names were synonymized by Dutch entomologist Maurits Lieftinck, who undertook a broad revision of the genus, and gave this species the current name of Thyreus caeruleopunctatus. The specific name (caeruleopunctatus) means "sky-blue spotted" in Latin.

== Description ==
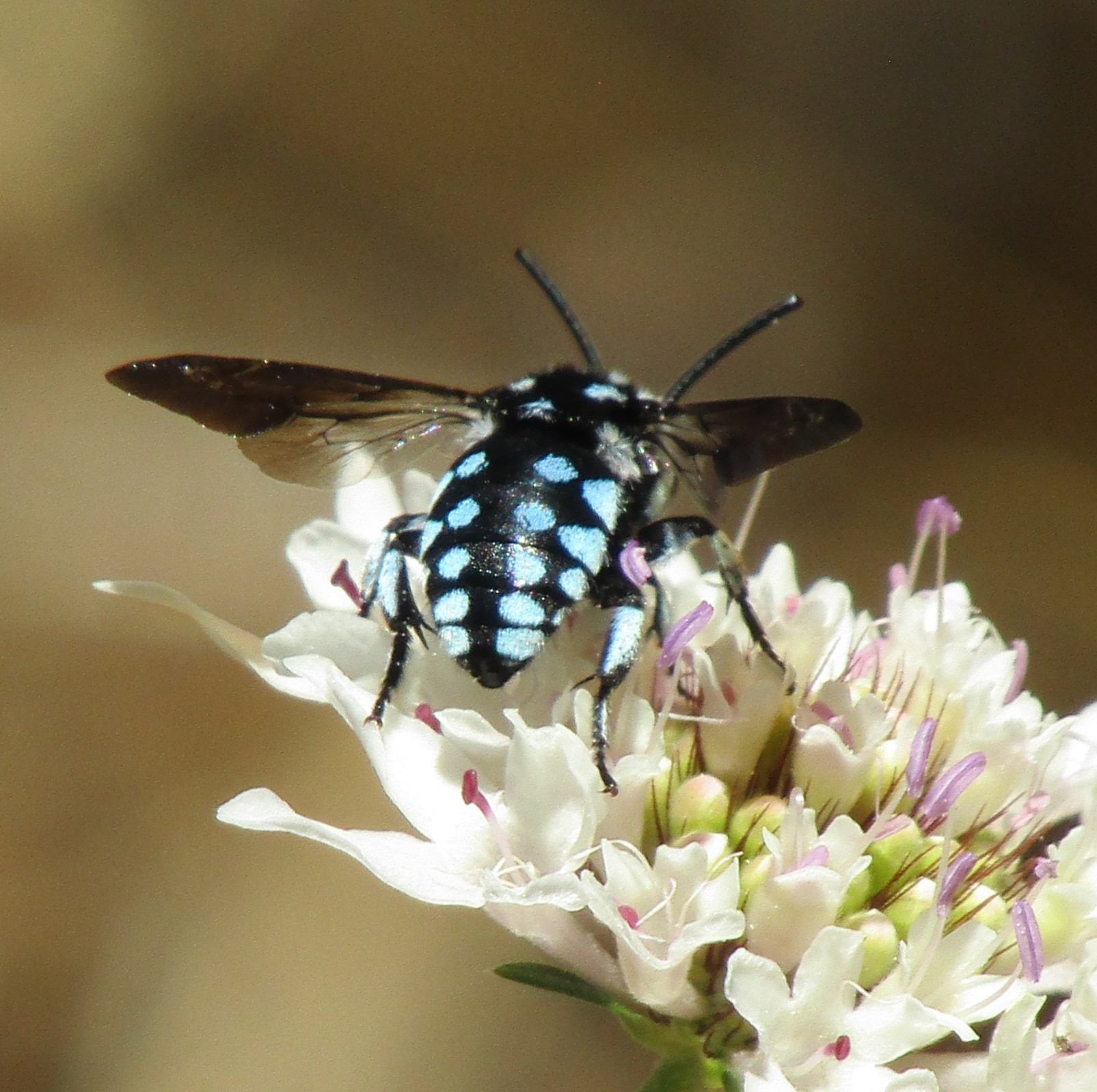
Chequered cuckoo bee collecting nectar from Scabiosa atropurpurea

This bee is stocky and approximately 10 to 12 millimetres in length. It is mostly black, with four rows of pale blue hair spots running lengthwise on top of the abdomen, and two rows of pale blue hair spots underneath. As in other bees of this genus, the thorax has a flat projection covering the waist, which is believed to act as a shield. This thoracic shield has a small blue hair spot, and there is also pale blue hair on the sides of the thorax. The legs are spiny and they have pale blue hair on the outer surfaces. The head is large, with black-brown eyes, black antennae, a long tongue, and pale blue hair on the face. The forewings measure 6.8 to 8.5 millimetres in length and they are smoky grey-brown in colour. The hindwings are mostly transparent.

== Distribution and habitat ==
The chequered cuckoo bee occurs in all mainland states and territories of Australia, and has also been recorded in south-eastern New Guinea. It uses a wide range of habitats, including forests, woodlands, heaths and urban areas.

== Behaviour and ecology ==
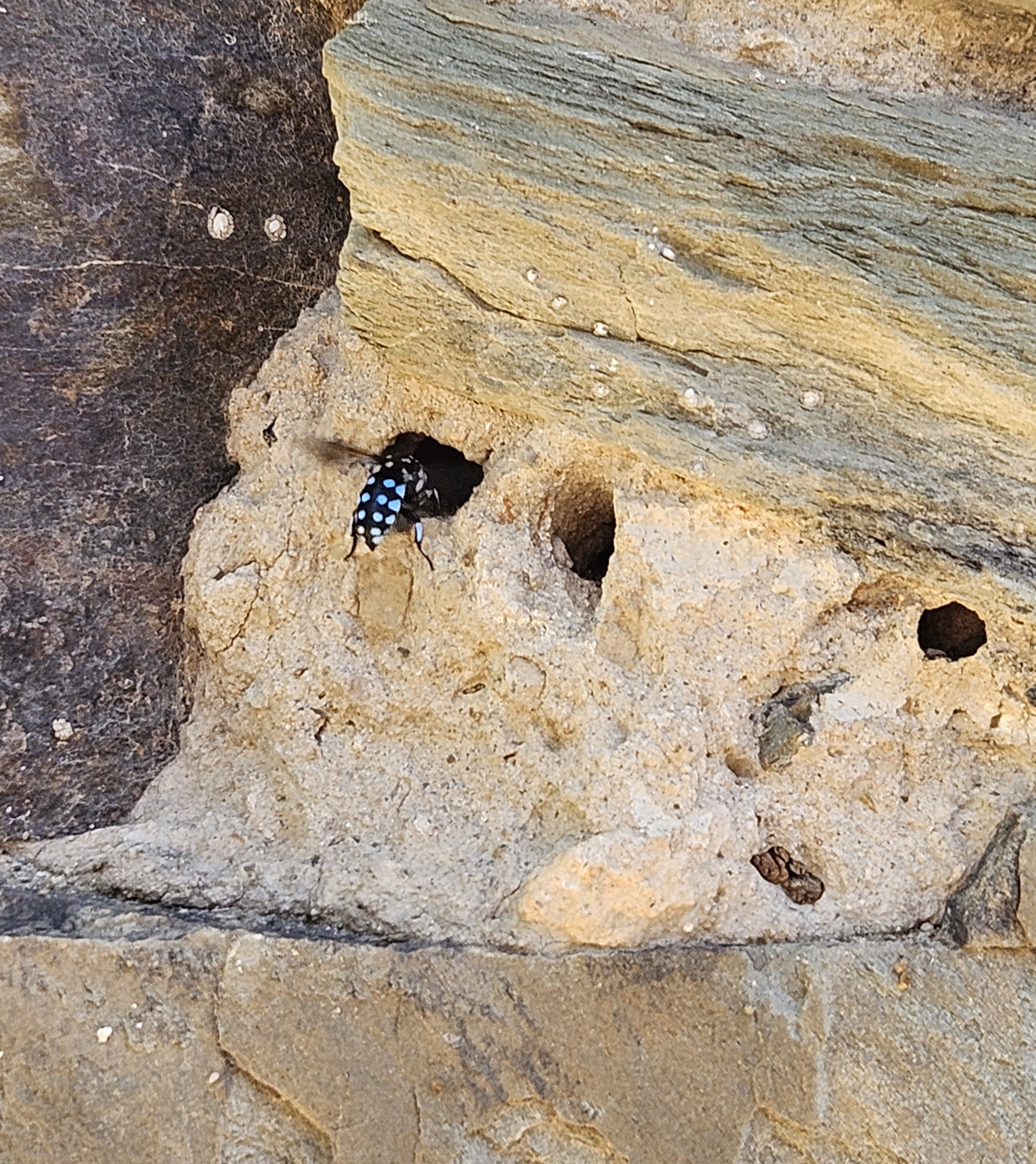
Entering an Amegilla nest.

The chequered cuckoo bee is diurnal and solitary. Females don’t build nests, and they don’t have scopal hairs to collect pollen. They pursue bees of the Amegilla genus to locate their nests, and then lay an egg in a brood cell that has been provisioned by the Amegilla host. The Thyreus egg hatches before the Amegilla egg, and the larva eats the food supply. It then pupates and emerges as an adult while the Amegilla larva starves to death. It’s believed the specialised thoracic shield on cuckoo bees is an adaptation to defend against attack by nesting Amegilla females. Amegilla pulchra has been confirmed as a host species of Thyreus caeruleopunctatus. The larvae and pupae of Thyreus are much more active than those of the Amegilla hosts, and this vigorous movement can be a way to distinguish between the two species in a nest.

The chequered cuckoo bee has been recorded collecting nectar from a wide range of plants, including species from the Asteraceae, Boraginaceae and Myrtaceae families. Research conducted in Victoria found that it’s an important pollinator of the native orchid Spiranthes australis.
