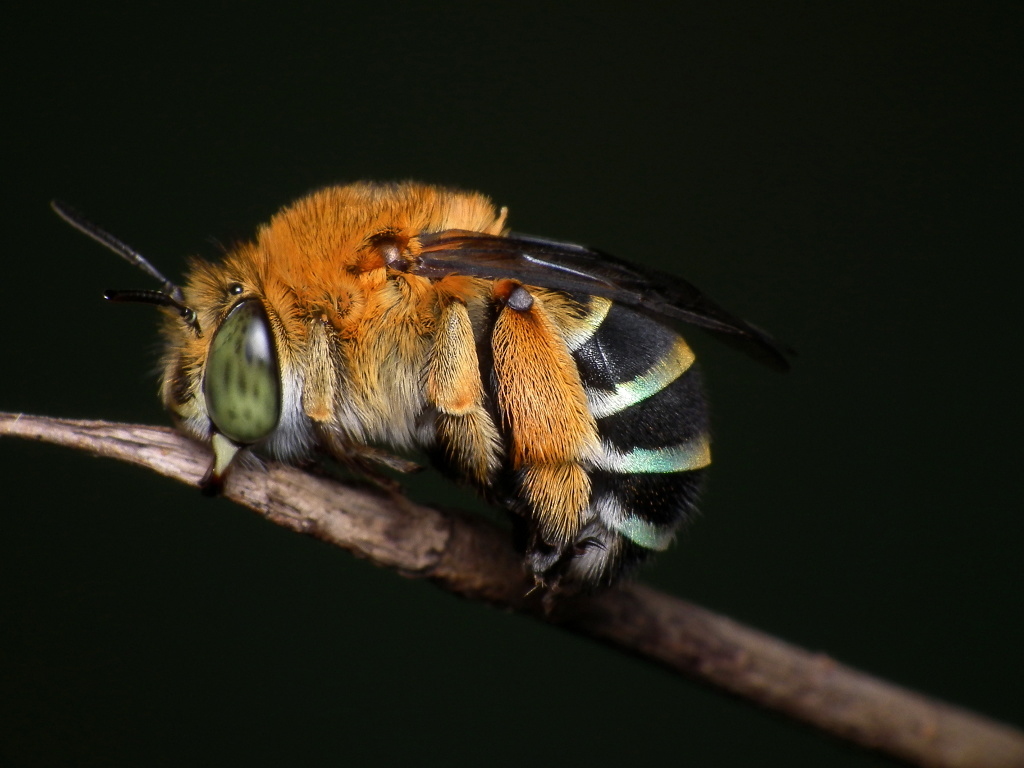

Scientific classification
- Kingdom: Animalia
- Phylum: Arthropoda
- Class: Insecta
- Order: Hymenoptera
- Family: Apidae
- Genus: Amegilla
- Species: A. cingulata

Binomial name
- Amegilla cingulata (Fabricius, 1775)

Synonyms
- Anthophora emendata F. Smith, 1879; Anthophora emendata gilberti Cockerell, 1905; Anthophora lilacina Cockerell, 1921

= Amegilla cingulata =

Species of bee

Amegilla cingulata is a species of blue-banded bee native to Australia. Currently, several scientific organizations are conducting research on how A. cingulata benefits agriculture through its distinctive "buzz pollination".

== Taxonomy ==
A. cingulata was first described by Danish entomologist Johan Christian Fabricius in 1775. Its specific epithet cingulata is from the Latin word cingulum ("belt") referring to the bee's bands. The genus Amegilla contains over 250 additional species, but several are virtually indistinguishable from A. cingulata, so they are commonly confused with it.

== Description ==
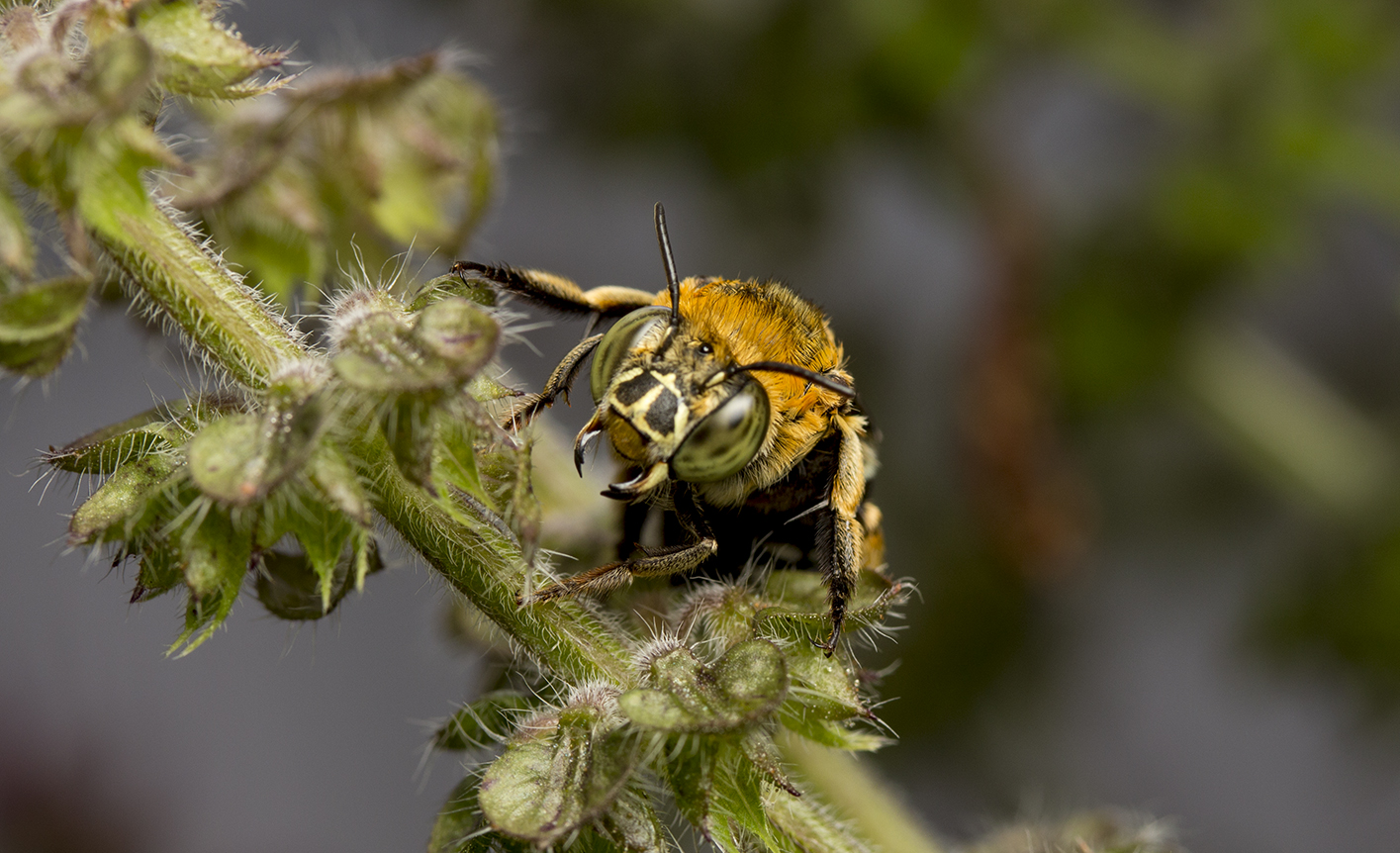
Female

A. cingulata has a very striking appearance similar to several other species of Amegilla. Unlike honey bees, it has pale opalescent blue stripes on its abdomen. The male can be distinguished by the number of complete bands, having five as opposed to the females' four. In size, A. cingulata can grow to 10–12 mm (0.39–0.47 in).

== Distribution and habitat ==
A. cingulata is found along the coast and inland in New South Wales, Queensland, Victoria and the Australian Capital Territory, as well as South Australia and Western Australia; reports of this species from places such as Papua New Guinea, Indonesia, East Timor, Malaysia, and India are all erroneous. It appears to live in tropical, subtropical and temperate regions. The bees inhabit urban areas, woodlands, forests, and heath areas.

== Behaviour ==
A. cingulata can sting, but are not as aggressive as other bees. They appear to be more rapid in movement than other bees. The males cling to plant stems during the night. They are solitary creatures, with single females inhabiting burrows in the soft sandstone or clay, unlike social species such as honey bees, which live in large colonies.

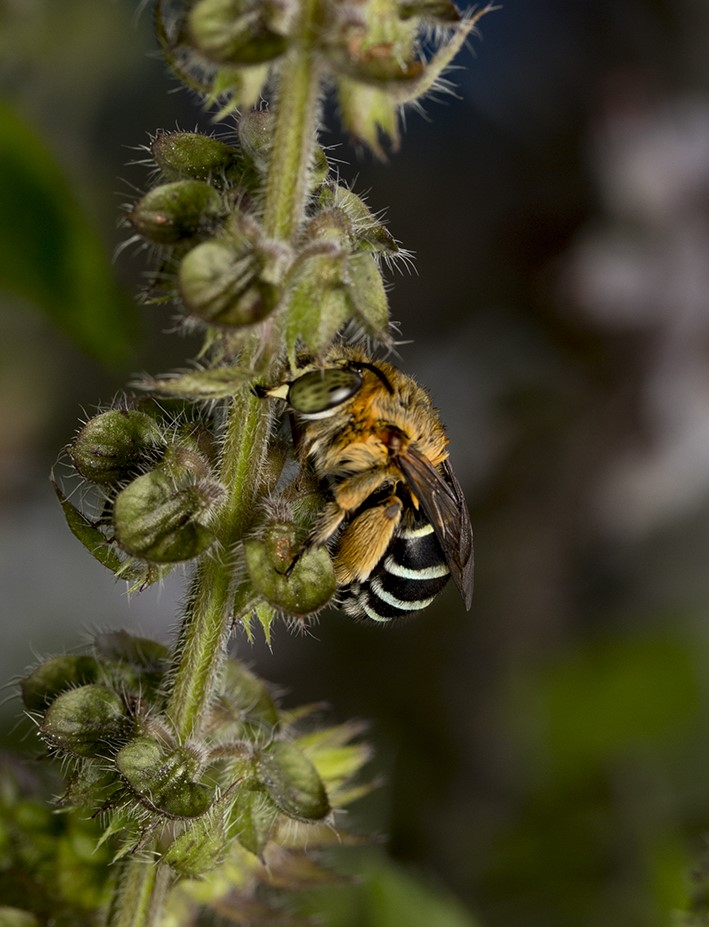

=== Diet ===
A. cingulata in Australia collects the majority of its nectar from blue flowers, although others investigated include mountain devil (Lambertia formosa) and grey spider flower (Grevillea buxifolia), as well as the introduced Abelia grandiflora and lavender (Lavandula species). They also feed on some non-blue flowers such as the white form of Salvia coccinea, tomato (Solanum lycopersicum), and eggplant (Solanum melongena) flowers, white flowers of Leea indica, and some members of the family Verbenaceae. Bees in the genus Amegilla use a process that involves clinging onto flowers and vibrating powerfully, which increases the release of pollen.

=== Life cycle ===
A. cingulata build solitary nests, but often close to other conspecifics. A. cingulata tend to nest in burrows in dried-up river banks, old clay homes, and mortar between bricks, but may also burrow in soft sandstone, and areas of this type of rock can become riddled with bee tunnels. Cells, at the end of tunnels, contain an egg with a pollen/nectar mixture for the larval food.

=== Threats ===
A. cingulata are preyed upon by many animals, including birds, frogs and cane toads. Their nests are parasitized by the neon cuckoo bee Thyreus nitidulus. Human activity, for example the clearing of river banks in the Caboolture River, may threaten nest sites of this bee.
