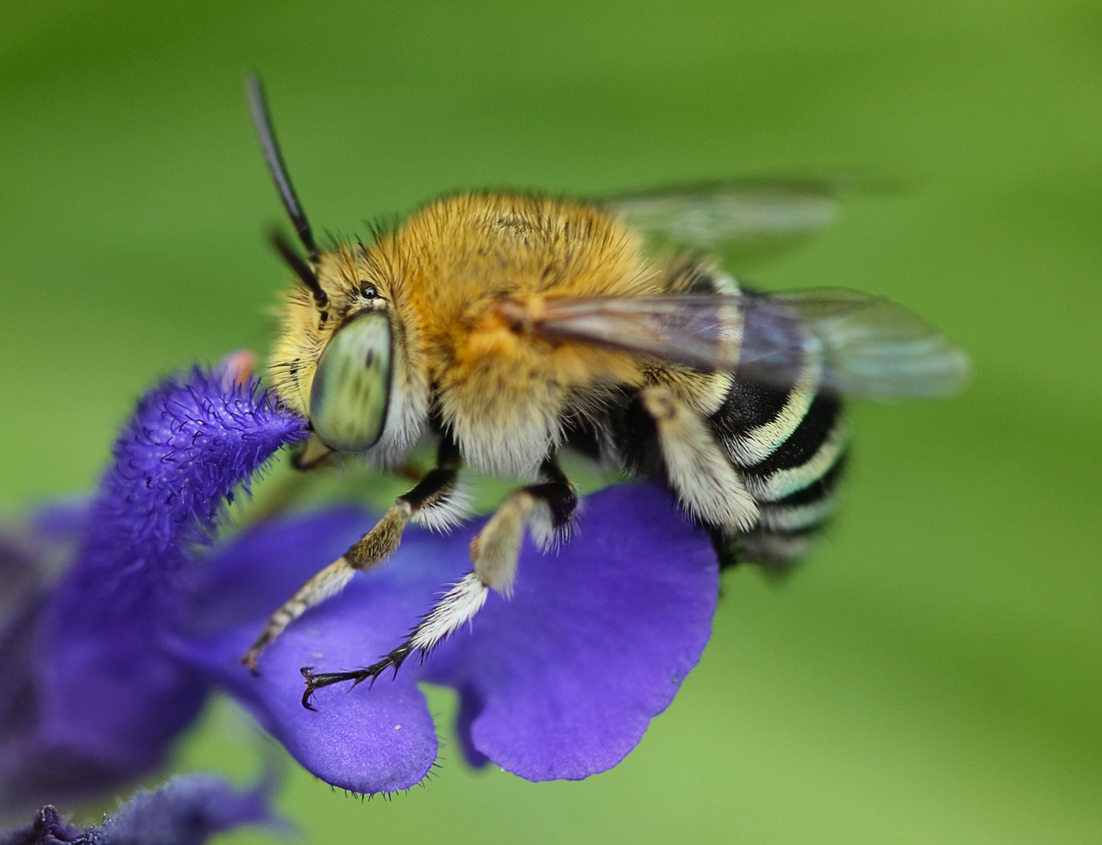
- Amegilla cingulata

Scientific classification
- Kingdom: Animalia
- Phylum: Arthropoda
- Clade: Pancrustacea
- Class: Insecta
- Order: Hymenoptera
- Family: Apidae
- Subfamily: Apinae
- Tribe: Anthophorini
- Genus: Amegilla; Friese, 1897

= Amegilla =

Genus of insects, 'blue-banded bees'

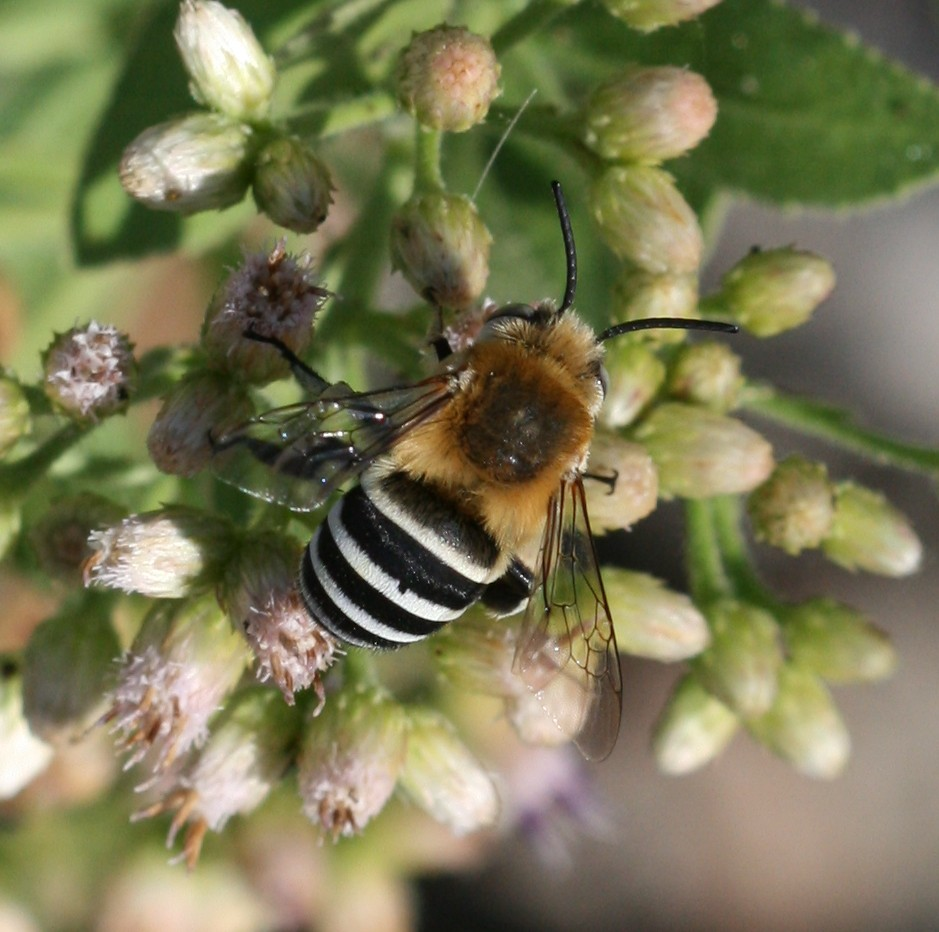
Amegilla quadrifasciata

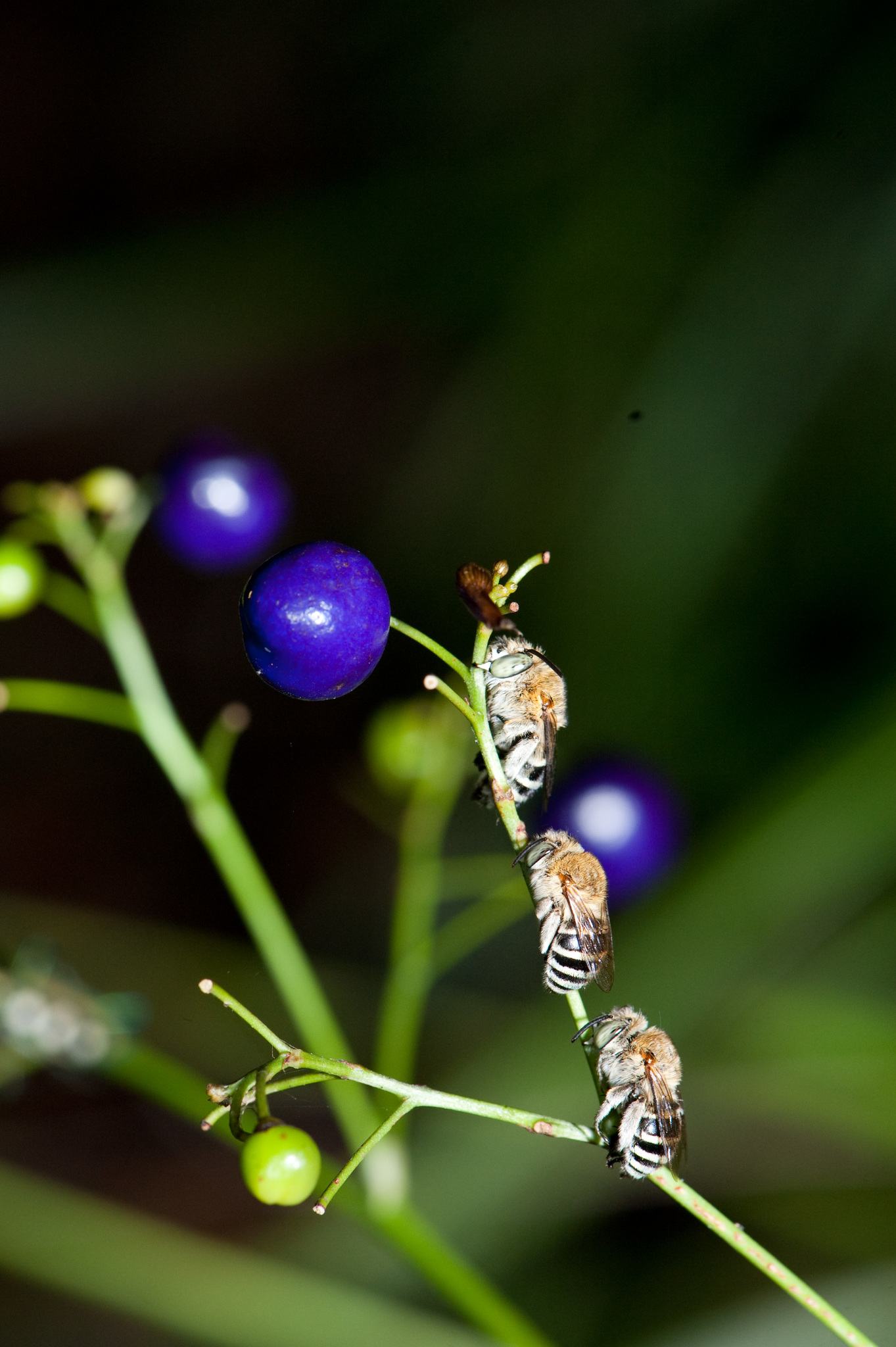
Amegilla calceifera

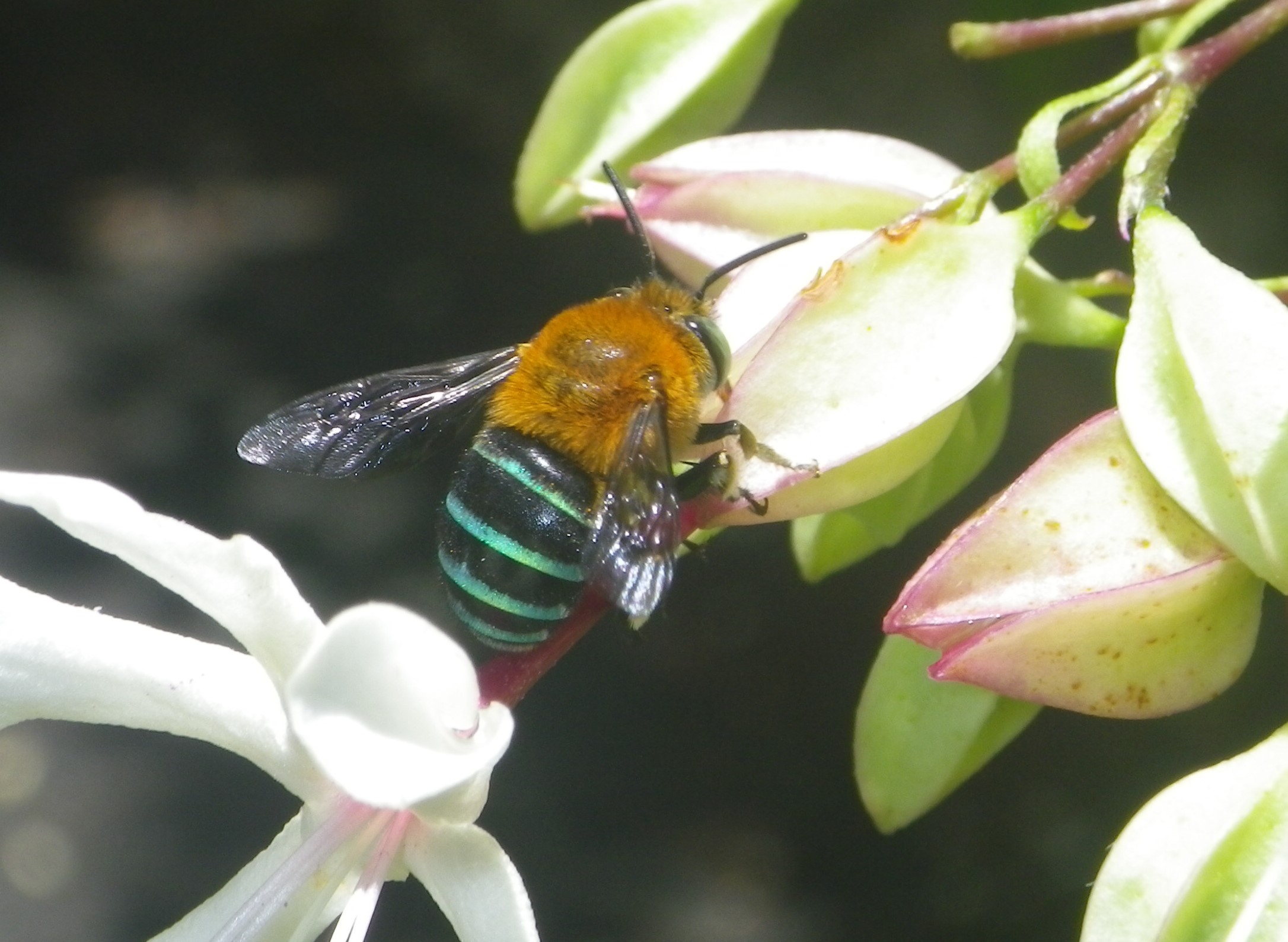
Amegilla dulcifera

Amegilla is a large genus of bees, with about 260 species, in the tribe Anthophorini. It has been split into many subgenera, including Asaropoda, Micramegilla, Notomegilla and Zonamegilla.

== Description ==
Amegilla are generally medium-sized to very large bees, robust and about 10–12 mm in length. The body and legs are hairy, and the tongue and proboscis are long. All Amegilla species burrow to make nests and they are commonly referred to as "digger bees". Several species have blue metallic bands on the abdomen and are referred to as "blue-banded bees". Bands may differ with the sex, with males having more bands than females.

They are very fast, agile flyers, and because of this, some taxa are close to impossible to catch. This in combination with the fact that some species are known from only a few specimens means that their abundance and distribution is believed to be underestimated.

== Range and habitat ==
The genus occurs all around the world, but few species live above 45° North. Amegilla are associated with arid and subarid biomes, matorrals, steppes, sub-deserts and deserts. They also commonly occur in farmlands, especially those that border their preferred habitats.

== Ecology and behaviour ==
Several Amegilla species, specifically Amegilla nigritar and Amegilla zonata, pollinate the orchid species Phalaenopsis pulcherrima. Females are adept at buzz-pollination, and some species have proven or potential value as pollinators of greenhouse tomatoes.

At a glance, they may be confused with honey bees. However, they do not produce harvestable honey or live in colonies. Amegilla bees also carry their pollen between hairs on the hind legs, whereas in honey bees the hind leg has a smooth, spoon-shaped area where pollen is collected.

== Species ==
- List of Amegilla species

== See also ==
- Josephine Cardale, an Amegilla researcher
