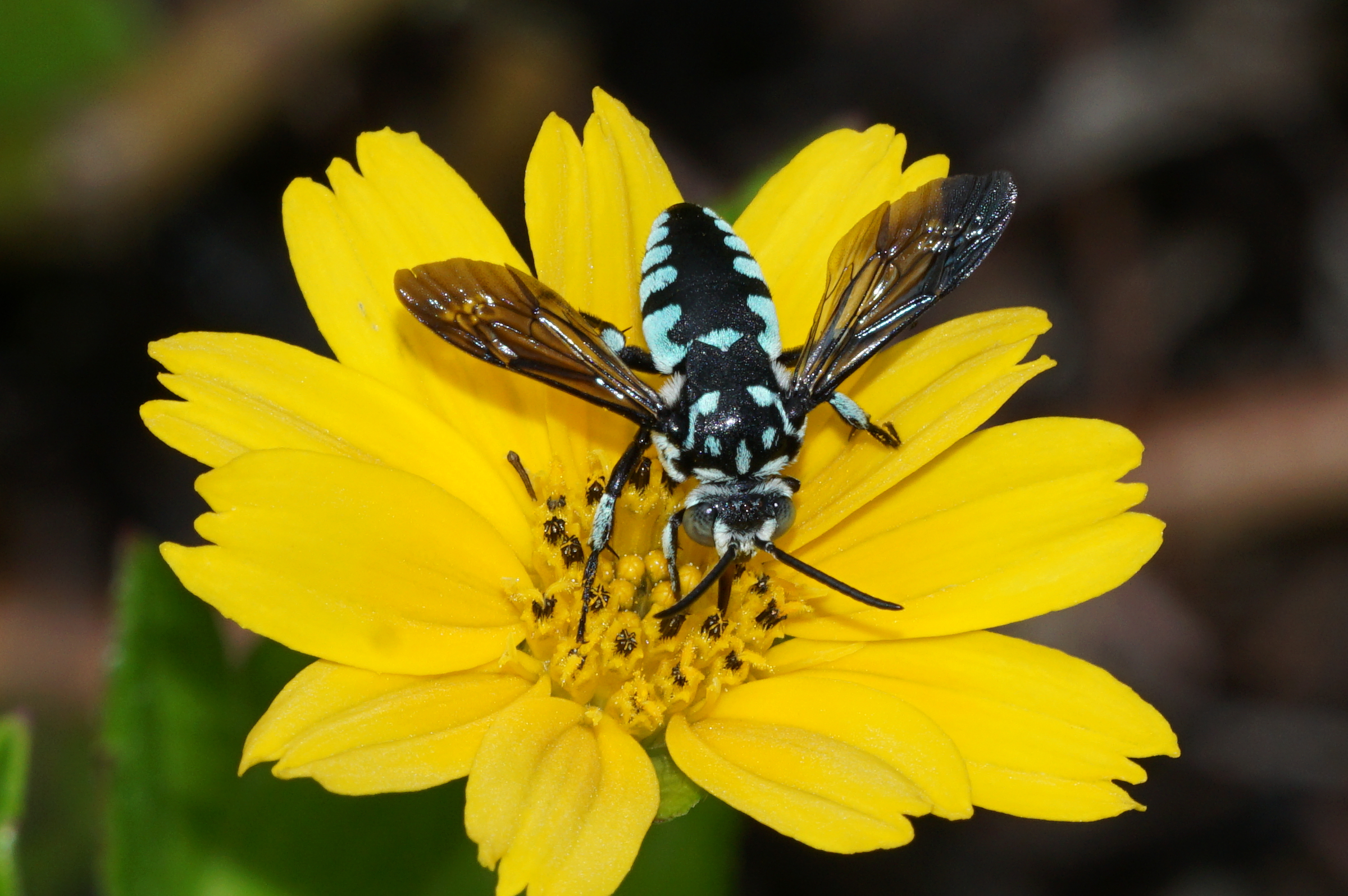
- Thyreus nitidulus

Scientific classification
- Kingdom: Animalia
- Phylum: Arthropoda
- Clade: Pancrustacea
- Class: Insecta
- Order: Hymenoptera
- Family: Apidae
- Tribe: Melectini
- Genus: Thyreus; Panzer, 1806

Type species
- Nomada scutellaris Fabricius, 1781

Synonyms
- Crocissa; Crocisa

= Thyreus =

Genus of bees

Thyreus is an Old World genus of bees, one of many commonly known as cuckoo bees, or cloak-and-dagger bees, that are kleptoparasites of other species of bees, mostly in the genus Amegilla. They all have strongly contrasting patterns. For example, three species from the Sydney region, Thyreus nitidulus, T. lugubris, and T. caeruleopunctatus, are bright blue and black.

== Species ==
See: List of Thyreus species

== See also ==
- Bee genera
