= List of Amegilla species =

These species belong to Amegilla, a genus of anthophorine bees in the family Apidae.

== Amegilla species ==
- Amegilla acraensis (Fabricius, 1793) (Africa)
- Amegilla adelaidae (Cockerell, 1905) (Australia)
- Amegilla advenula (Cockerell, 1930) (Africa)
- Amegilla aerizusa (Vachal, 1903) (Africa)
- Amegilla aeruginosa (Smith, 1854) (Australia)
- Amegilla africana (Friese, 1905) (Africa)
- Amegilla albiceps (Rayment, 1951) (Australia)
- Amegilla albiclypeata Leijs, 2020 (Australia)
- Amegilla albigena (Lepeletier, 1841) (Africa, Europe, Asia)
- Amegilla albigenella Michener, 1965 (Australia)
- Amegilla albocaudata (Dours, 1869) (Africa)
- Amegilla alpha (Cockerell, 1904) (Australia)
- Amegilla amymone (Bingham, 1896) (southern Asia)
- Amegilla andresi (Friese, 1914) (Africa and Palearctic)
- Amegilla andrewsi (Cockerell, 1910) (south-east Asia)
- Amegilla anekawarna Engel, 2007 (southern Asia)
- Amegilla annos (Vachal, 1903) (Africa)
- Amegilla antimena (Saussure, 1890) (Africa)
- Amegilla arcana (Cockerell, 1936) (Africa)
- Amegilla argophenax Engel, 2007 (Africa)
- Amegilla aspergina (Cockerell, 1933) (Africa and South America)
- Amegilla asserta (Cockerell, 1926) (Australia)
- Amegilla atribasis (Cockerell, 1933) (Africa)
- Amegilla atripes (Friese, 1922) (southern Asia)
- Amegilla atrocaerulea (Dours, 1869) (southern Asia)
- Amegilla atrocincta (Lepeletier, 1841) (Africa)
- Amegilla aurantia Leijs, 2020 (Australia)
- Amegilla aurata (Friese, 1911) (Australia)
- Amegilla batleyi Leijs, 2020 (Australia)
- Amegilla bechuanensis (Cockerell, 1935) (Africa)
- Amegilla bequaerti (Cockerell, 1930) (Africa)
- Amegilla berylae (Rayment, 1947) (Australia)
- Amegilla binghami (Schulz, 1906) (southern Asia)
- Amegilla bombiformis (Smith, 1854) (Australia)
- Amegilla borneensis (Cockerell, 1910) (southern Asia)
- Amegilla bothai (Friese, 1911) (Africa)
- Amegilla bouwmani (Lieftinck, 1944) (southern Asia)
- Amegilla brookiae (Bingham, 1890) (southern Asia)
- Amegilla brooksi Eardley, 1994 (Africa)
- Amegilla bucharica (Gussakovsky, 1935) (Palearctic)
- Amegilla buruensis (Cockerell, 1911) (southern Asia)
- Amegilla byssina (Klug, 1845) (Africa and southern Asia)
- Amegilla caelestina (Cockerell, 1919) (Africa)
- Amegilla caerulea (Friese, 1905) (Africa)
- Amegilla calceifera (Cockerell, 1911) (southern and temperate Asia)
- Amegilla calens (Lepeletier, 1841) (Africa)
- Amegilla calva (Rayment, 1935) (Australia)
- Amegilla camelorum (Cockerell, 1911) (Palearctic)
- Amegilla cana (Walker, 1871) (Africa)
- Amegilla candida (Smith, 1879) (Palearctic and southern Asia)
- Amegilla candidella (Priesner, 1957) (Africa)
- Amegilla canifronoides Brooks, 1988 (West Africa)
- Amegilla canifrons (Smith, 1854) (Africa)
- Amegilla capensis (Friese, 1905) (Africa)
- Amegilla capeverdensis Brooks, 1988 (West Africa)
- Amegilla centralis (Cockerell, 1930) (Africa)
- Amegilla chlorocyanea (Cockerell, 1914) (Australia)
- Amegilla cincta (Fabricius, 1781) (Africa)
- Amegilla cinctofemorata (Dours, 1869) (Australia)
- Amegilla cingulata (Fabricius, 1775) (Australia)
- Amegilla cingulifera (Cockerell, 1910) (Palearctic, southern and temperate Asia)
- Amegilla cinnyris (Lieftinck, 1944) (southern Asia)
- Amegilla circulata (Fabricius, 1781) (Africa)
- Amegilla comberi (Cockerell, 1911) (southern Asia)
- Amegilla comorensis Brooks & Pauly, 2001 (Africa)
- Amegilla confusa (Smith, 1854) (southern Asia)
- Amegilla crenata Leijs, 2020 (Australia)
- Amegilla crocea (Klug, 1845) (Africa)
- Amegilla cymatilis Eardley, 1994 (Africa)
- Amegilla cyrtandrae (Lieftinck, 1944) (southern Asia)
- Amegilla dawsoni (Rayment, 1951) (Dawson's burrowing bee) (Australia)
- Amegilla deceptrix (Priesner, 1957) (Africa)
- Amegilla deltoides (Buysson, 1897) (Africa)
- Amegilla dentiventris (Rayment, 1951) (Australia)
- Amegilla disrupta (Cockerell, 1920) (Africa)
- Amegilla dizona Engel, 2009 (Africa and southern Asia)
- Amegilla dohertyi (Gribodo, 1894) (southern Asia)
- Amegilla dulcifera (Cockerell, 1926) (southern Asia)
- Amegilla elegans (Smith, 1859) (southern Asia)
- Amegilla elephas (Lieftinck, 1944) (southern Asia)
- Amegilla elsei Brooks, 1988 (Africa)
- Amegilla epaphrodita Brooks, 1988 (Australia)
- Amegilla eritrina (Friese, 1915) (Africa)
- Amegilla expleta (Vachal, 1910) (Africa)
- Amegilla fallax (Smith, 1879) (Africa and southern Asia)
- Amegilla farinosa (Klug, 1845) (Africa)
- Amegilla fasciata (Fabricius, 1775) (Africa and Palearctic)
- Amegilla feronia (Lieftinck, 1944) (southern Asia)
- Amegilla ferrocincta (Cockerell, 1936) (Africa)
- Amegilla fimbriata (Smith, 1879) (southern Asia)
- Amegilla flammeozonata (Dours, 1869) (southern Asia)
- Amegilla flava (Friese, 1911) (Australia)
- Amegilla florea (Smith, 1879) (Palearctic, southern and temperate Asia)
- Amegilla froggatti (Cockerell, 1914) (Australia)
- Amegilla garrula (Rossi, 1790) (Palearctic)
- Amegilla gigas (Friese, 1922) (southern Asia)
- Amegilla glauca (Alfken, 1926) (Africa)
- Amegilla glycyrrhizae (Gussakovsky, 1935) (Palearctic)
- Amegilla godofredi (Sichel, 1869) (West Africa)
- Amegilla grandiceps (Friese, 1905) (Africa)
- Amegilla griseocincta Leijs, 2020 (Australia)
- Amegilla griseotecta (Cockerell, 1946) (Africa)
- Amegilla grisescens (Rayment, 1931) (Australia)
- Amegilla gussakovskyi (Popov, 1946) (Palearctic)
- Amegilla hackeri (Rayment, 1947) (Australia)
- Amegilla hainanensis Wu, 2000 (southern Asia)
- Amegilla hanitschi (Meade-Waldo, 1914) (southern Asia)
- Amegilla harttigi (Alfken, 1926) (Palearctic)
- Amegilla hastula (Vachal, 1909) (Africa)
- Amegilla himalajensis (Radoszkowski, 1882) (southern Asia)
- Amegilla houstoni Brooks, 1988 (Australia)
- Amegilla hypocyanea (Cockerell, 1930) (Africa)
- Amegilla imitata (Rayment, 1951) (Australia)
- Amegilla incana (Klug, 1845) (Africa)
- Amegilla incognita Leijs, 2020 (Australia)
- Amegilla indistincta Leijs, Batley & Hogendoorn, 2017 (Australia)
- Amegilla insignata Brooks, 1988 (southern Asia)
- Amegilla insularis (Smith, 1857) (southern Asia)
- Amegilla jacobi (Lieftinck, 1944) (southern Asia)
- Amegilla kaimosica (Cockerell, 1946) (Africa)
- Amegilla kalahari Eardley, 1994 (Africa)
- Amegilla karakumensis (Gussakovsky, 1935) (Palearctic)
- Amegilla karlba Leijs, Batley & Hogendoorn, 2017 (Australia)
- Amegilla katangensis (Cockerell, 1930) (Africa)
- Amegilla korotonensis (Cockerell, 1911) (southern Asia)
- Amegilla kuleni Eardley, 1994 (Africa)
- Amegilla langi (Cockerell, 1935) (Africa)
- Amegilla latizona (Spinola, 1838) (Africa)
- Amegilla liberica (Cockerell, 1930) (Africa)
- Amegilla lieftincki Brooks, 1988 (southern Asia)
- Amegilla lomamica (Cockerell, 1936) (Africa)
- Amegilla lutulenta (Klug, 1845) (Africa)
- Amegilla luzonica (Cockerell, 1914) (southern Asia)
- Amegilla maclachlani (Fedtschenko, 1875) (Palearctic)
- Amegilla macroleuca (Cockerell, 1922) (southern Asia)
- Amegilla maculicornis (Lepeletier, 1841) (Africa)
- Amegilla madecassa (Saussure, 1890) (Africa)
- Amegilla malaccensis (Friese, 1918) (southern Asia)
- Amegilla marqueti (Pérez, 1895) (Africa)
- Amegilla mauritanica (Benoist, 1950) (Africa)
- Amegilla mcnamarae (Cockerell, 1929) (southern Asia)
- Amegilla medicorum (Cockerell, 1910) (Africa)
- Amegilla meltonensis (Rayment, 1951) (Australia)
- Amegilla mesopyrrha (Cockerell, 1930) (southern Asia)
- Amegilla michaelis (Cockerell, 1930) (Africa)
- Amegilla mimadvena (Cockerell, 1916) (Africa)
- Amegilla mimica (Rayment, 1944) (Australia)
- Amegilla modestoides Brooks, 1988 (West Africa)
- Amegilla mongolica Wu, 1990 (southern Asia)
- Amegilla montivaga (Fedtschenko, 1875) (Palearctic and southern Asia)
- Amegilla mucorea (Klug, 1845) (Africa and southern Asia)
- Amegilla murrayensis (Rayment, 1935) (Australia)
- Amegilla natalensis (Friese, 1922) (Africa)
- Amegilla nigricornis (Morawitz, 1873) (Palearctic and southern Asia)
- Amegilla nigritarsis (Friese, 1905) (Africa)
- Amegilla nigroclypeata (Friese, 1909) (Africa)
- Amegilla nigropilosa (Friese, 1896) (Africa)
- Amegilla nila Eardley, 1994 (Africa)
- Amegilla nitidiventris Leijs, 2020 (Australia)
- Amegilla nivea (Lepeletier, 1841) (Africa)
- Amegilla niveata (Friese, 1905) (Africa)
- Amegilla niveocincta (Smith, 1854) (southern Asia)
- Amegilla nonconforma Brooks, 1988 (Africa)
- Amegilla nubica (Lepeletier, 1841) (Africa)
- Amegilla obscuriceps (Friese, 1905) (Africa)
- Amegilla ochroleuca (Pérez, 1879) (Africa and Palearctic)
- Amegilla omissa (Priesner, 1957) (Africa)
- Amegilla paeninsulae Leijs, Batley & Hogendoorn, 2017 (Australia)
- Amegilla pagdeni Lieftinck, 1956 (southern Asia)
- Amegilla paracalva Brooks, 1993 (Australia)
- Amegilla paradoxa Brooks, 1988 (Africa)
- Amegilla parhypate Lieftinck, 1975 (southern Asia)
- Amegilla pendleburyi (Cockerell, 1929) (southern Asia)
- Amegilla penicula Eardley, 1994 (Africa)
- Amegilla potanini (Morawitz, 1890) (southern Asia)
- Amegilla preissi (Cockerell, 1910) (Australia)
- Amegilla proboscidea Lieftinck, 1956 (southern Asia)
- Amegilla pseudobomboides (Meade-Waldo, 1914) (southern Asia)
- Amegilla pulchra (Smith, 1854) (Australia)
- Amegilla pulverea (Walker, 1871) (Africa)
- Amegilla punctata (Rayment, 1931) (Australia)
- Amegilla punctifrons (Walker, 1871) (Africa and southern Asia)
- Amegilla puttalama (Strand, 1913) (southern Asia)
- Amegilla pyramidalis (W. F. Kirby, 1900) (Palearctic)
- Amegilla quadrata (Cockerell, 1911) (southern Asia)
- Amegilla quadrifasciata (de Villers, 1789) (Africa, Palearctic, and southern Asia)
- Amegilla rapida (Smith, 1879) (Africa and temperate Asia)
- Amegilla regalis (Cockerell, 1946) (Africa)
- Amegilla rhodoscymna (Cockerell, 1905) (Australia)
- Amegilla rickae (Rayment, 1951) (Australia)
- Amegilla robinae Brooks, 1988 (Africa)
- Amegilla rufa (Rayment, 1931) (Australia)
- Amegilla rufescens (Friese, 1911) (Australia)
- Amegilla ruficornis (Dours, 1869) (southern Asia)
- Amegilla rufipes (Lepeletier, 1841) (Africa)
- Amegilla salviae (Morawitz, 1876) (Africa, Palearctic, and southern Asia)
- Amegilla samarensis (Cockerell & LeVeque, 1925) (southern Asia)
- Amegilla sapiens (Cockerell, 1911) (Australia)
- Amegilla savignyi (Lepeletier, 1841) (Africa, Palearctic, and southern Asia)
- Amegilla scoparia Leijs, 2020 (Australia)
- Amegilla scymna (Gribodo, 1893) (Australia)
- Amegilla semipulverosa (Dours, 1869) (southern Asia)
- Amegilla senegalensis (Friese, 1922) (Africa)
- Amegilla sesquicincta (Erichson, 1842) (Africa)
- Amegilla sierra Eardley, 1994 (Africa)
- Amegilla simbana (Cockerell, 1936) (Africa)
- Amegilla sjoestedti (Friese, 1909) (Africa)
- Amegilla spec (Lepeletier, 1841)
- Amegilla spilostoma (Cameron, 1905) (Africa)
- Amegilla stantoni (Cockerell, 1911) (southern Asia)
- Amegilla subcoerulea (Lepeletier, 1841) (southern and temperate Asia)
- Amegilla subinsularis (Strand, 1910) (southern Asia)
- Amegilla subrussata (Cockerell, 1925) (southern Asia)
- Amegilla subtorrida (Cockerell, 1946) (Africa)
- Amegilla sumatrana Lieftinck, 1956 (southern Asia)
- Amegilla talaris (Pérez, 1895) (Africa)
- Amegilla terminata (Smith, 1879) (Africa)
- Amegilla ternatensis (Cockerell, 1910) (southern Asia)
- Amegilla tetrataeniata (Gribodo, 1894) (southern Asia)
- Amegilla thorogoodi (Rayment, 1939) (Australia)
- Amegilla triangulifera (Cockerell, 1933) (Africa)
- Amegilla tubifera (Cockerell, 1933) (Africa)
- Amegilla urens (Cockerell, 1911) (southern and temperate Asia)
- Amegilla vanderysti (Cockerell, 1936) (Africa)
- Amegilla vegeta (Bingham, 1896) (southern Asia)
- Amegilla velocissima (Fedtschenko, 1875) (Palearctic and southern Asia)
- Amegilla velutina (Friese, 1909) (Africa)
- Amegilla vestitula (Cockerell, 1936) (Africa)
- Amegilla victoriensis (Rayment, 1951) (Australia)
- Amegilla vigilans (Smith, 1861) (southern Asia)
- Amegilla violacea (Lepeletier, 1841) (southern Asia)
- Amegilla viridicingulata Leijs, Batley & Hogendoorn, 2017 (Australia)
- Amegilla vivida (Smith, 1879) (Africa)
- Amegilla walkeri (Cockerell, 1905) (Australia)
- Amegilla wallacei (Cockerell, 1907) (southern Asia)
- Amegilla whiteheadi (Cockerell, 1910) (southern Asia)
- Amegilla xerophila (Cockerell, 1911) (Palearctic)
- Amegilla xylocopoides Leijs, 2020 (Australia)
- Amegilla youngi Leijs, 2020 (Australia)
- Amegilla yunnanensis Wu, 1983 (southern Asia)
- Amegilla zonata (Linnaeus, 1758) (southern Asia)
