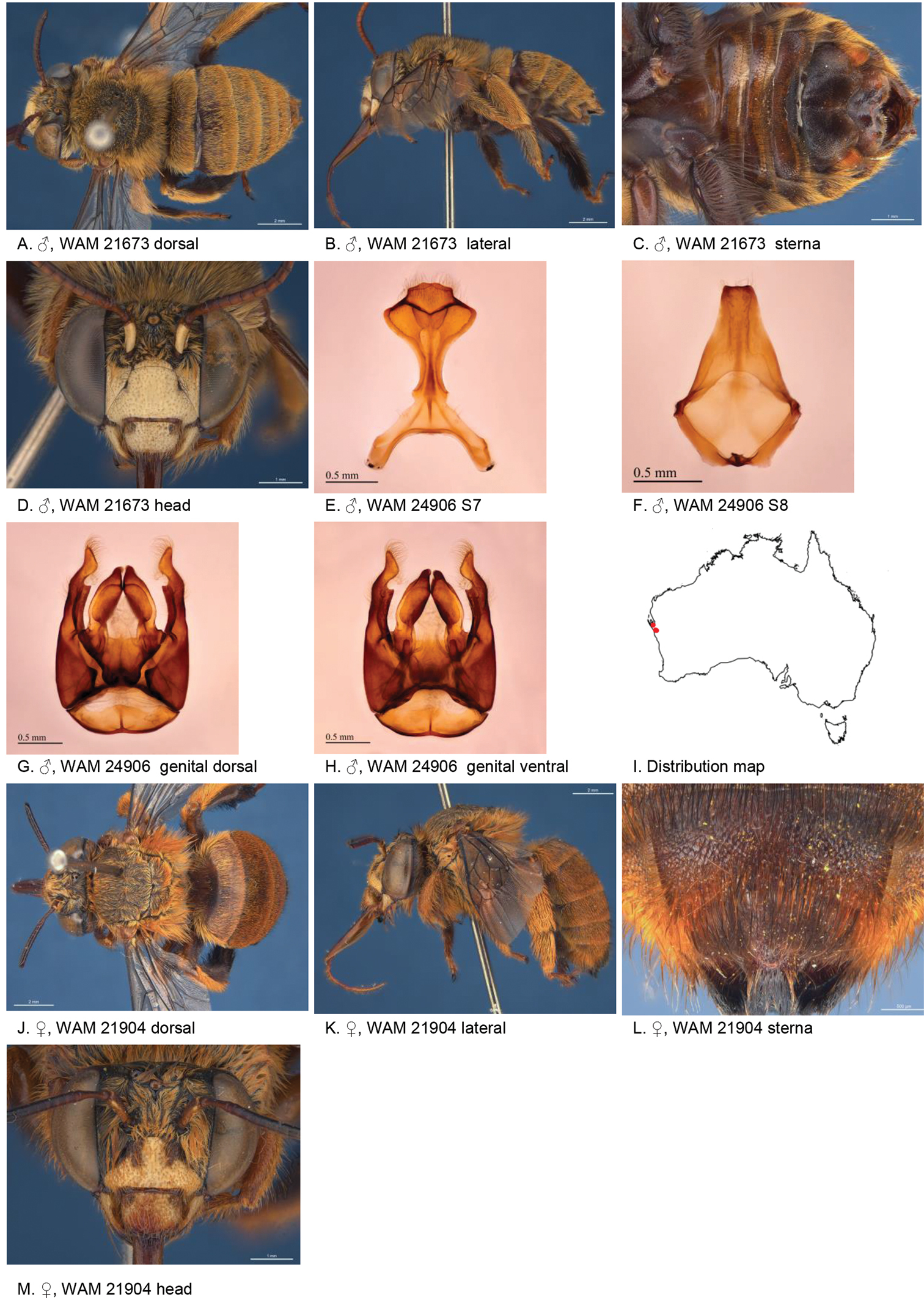

Scientific classification
- Kingdom: Animalia
- Phylum: Arthropoda
- Clade: Pancrustacea
- Class: Insecta
- Order: Hymenoptera
- Family: Apidae
- Genus: Amegilla
- Species: A. albiclypeata

Binomial name
- Amegilla albiclypeata Remko Leijs, 2020

= Amegilla albiclypeata =

Species of bee

Amegilla albiclypeata or Amegilla (Asaropoda) albiclypeata is a species of digger bee. It is endemic to Australia. It was described in 2020 by entomologist Remko Leijs.

== Etymology ==
The specific epithet albiclypeata refers to the white markings on the faces of the bees.

== Description ==
The body length is 14–15 mm, forewing length 9–10 mm, head width 5 mm.

== Distribution and habitat ==
The species occurs in Western Australia in the vicinity of Shark Bay and Kalbarri. The holotype was collected along Useless Loop Road.

== Behaviour ==
Flowering plants visited by the bees include Calothamnus formosus and Calothamnus blepharospermus.
