= Baudin Island =

Baudin Island is the name of two islands off the coast of Western Australia:

- Baudin Island (Shark Bay)
- Baudin Island (Kimberly coast)
26°30′54″S 113°38′55″E
14°7′44″S 125°36′12″E
