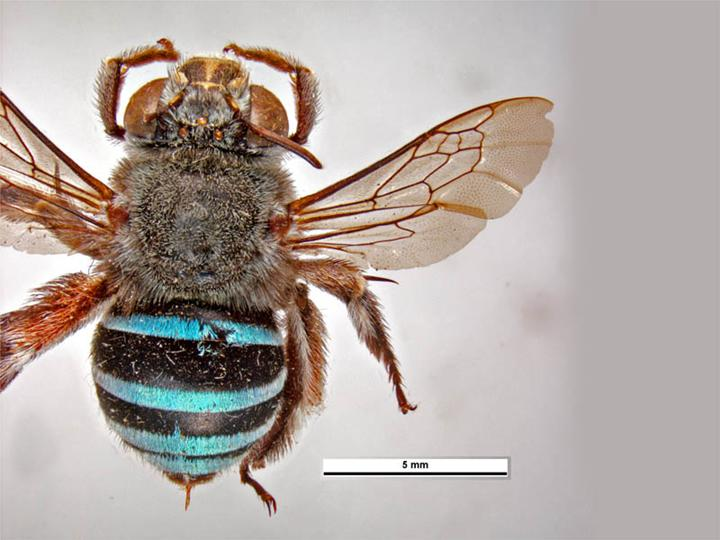
- Male

Scientific classification
- Kingdom: Animalia
- Phylum: Arthropoda
- Clade: Pancrustacea
- Class: Insecta
- Order: Hymenoptera
- Family: Apidae
- Genus: Amegilla
- Species: A. walkeri

Binomial name
- Amegilla walkeri (Cockerell, 1905)

Synonyms
- Anthophora walkeri Cockerell, 1905; Anthophora darwini Cockerell, 1910

= Amegilla walkeri =

Species of bee

Amegilla walkeri or Amegilla (Zonamegilla) walkeri is a species of digger bee. It is endemic to Australia. It was described in 1905 by British-American entomologist Theodore Dru Alison Cockerell.

== Description ==
The body length is 10–12 mm, forewing length 7–8 mm. Both sexes have grey fur on the scutum, due to a mixture of black and white hairs, with metallic, blue, fur bands on the terga.

== Distribution and habitat ==
The species occurs mainly in tropical areas of northern Australia, including the Kimberley region of Western Australia and the Top End of the Northern Territory. Type localities include Baudin Island on the Kimberley coast and Darwin.

== Behaviour ==
The adults are flying mellivores.
