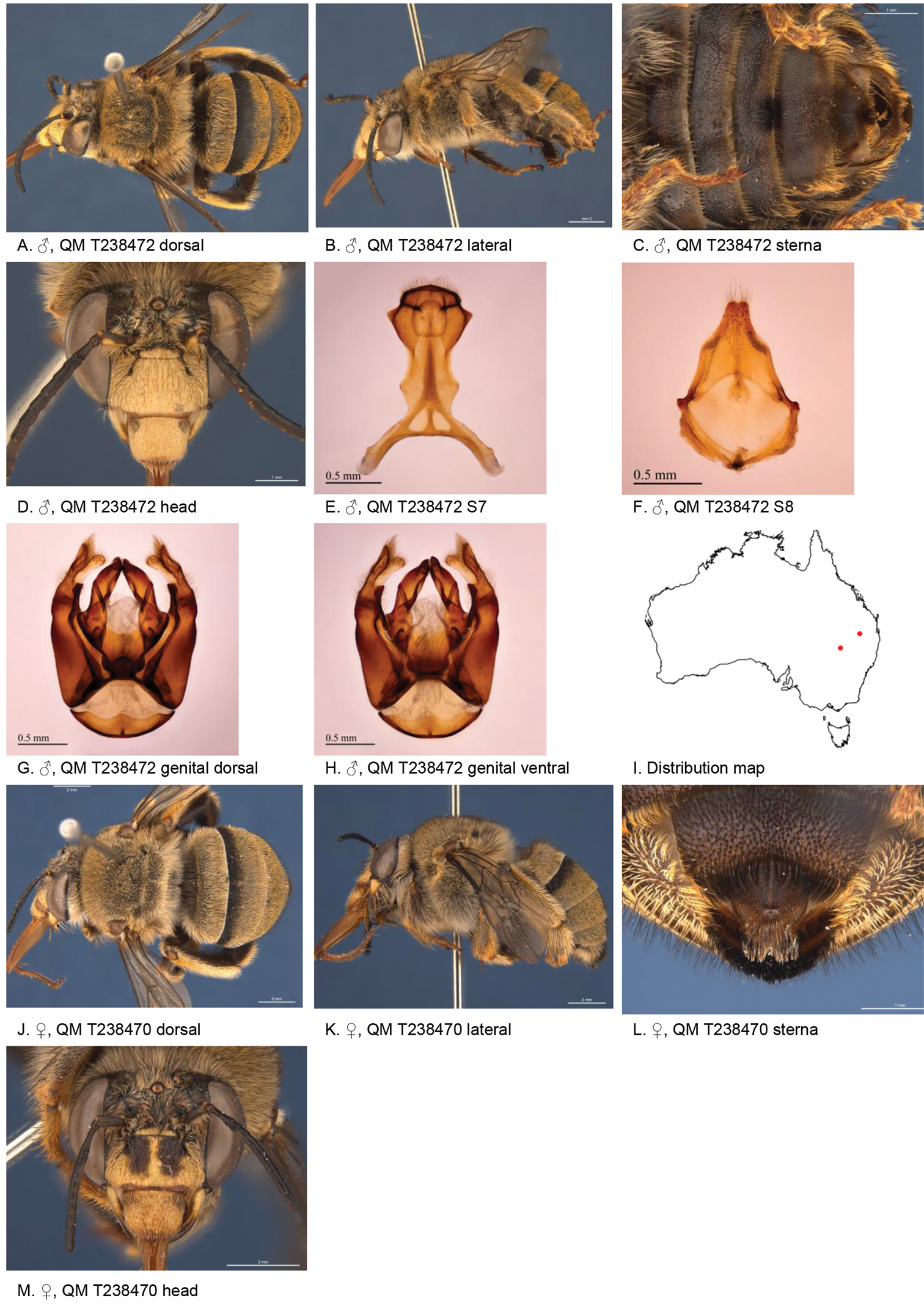

Scientific classification
- Kingdom: Animalia
- Phylum: Arthropoda
- Clade: Pancrustacea
- Class: Insecta
- Order: Hymenoptera
- Family: Apidae
- Genus: Amegilla
- Species: A. froggatti

Binomial name
- Amegilla froggatti (Cockerell, 1914)

Synonyms
- Anthophora preissi froggatti Cockerell, 1914

= Amegilla froggatti =

Species of bee

Amegilla froggatti or Amegilla (Asaropoda) froggatti is a species of digger bee. It is endemic to Australia. It was described in 1914 by British-American entomologist Theodore Dru Alison Cockerell.

== Description ==
The body length is 14 mm, forewing length 9–10 mm, head width 4–5 mm.

== Distribution and habitat ==
The species occurs in Queensland and New South Wales in the Brigalow Belt South, Cobar Peneplain and Darling Riverine Plains bioregions. The type locality is Brewarrina.

== Behaviour ==
Flowering plants visited by the bees include Capparis mitchellii.
