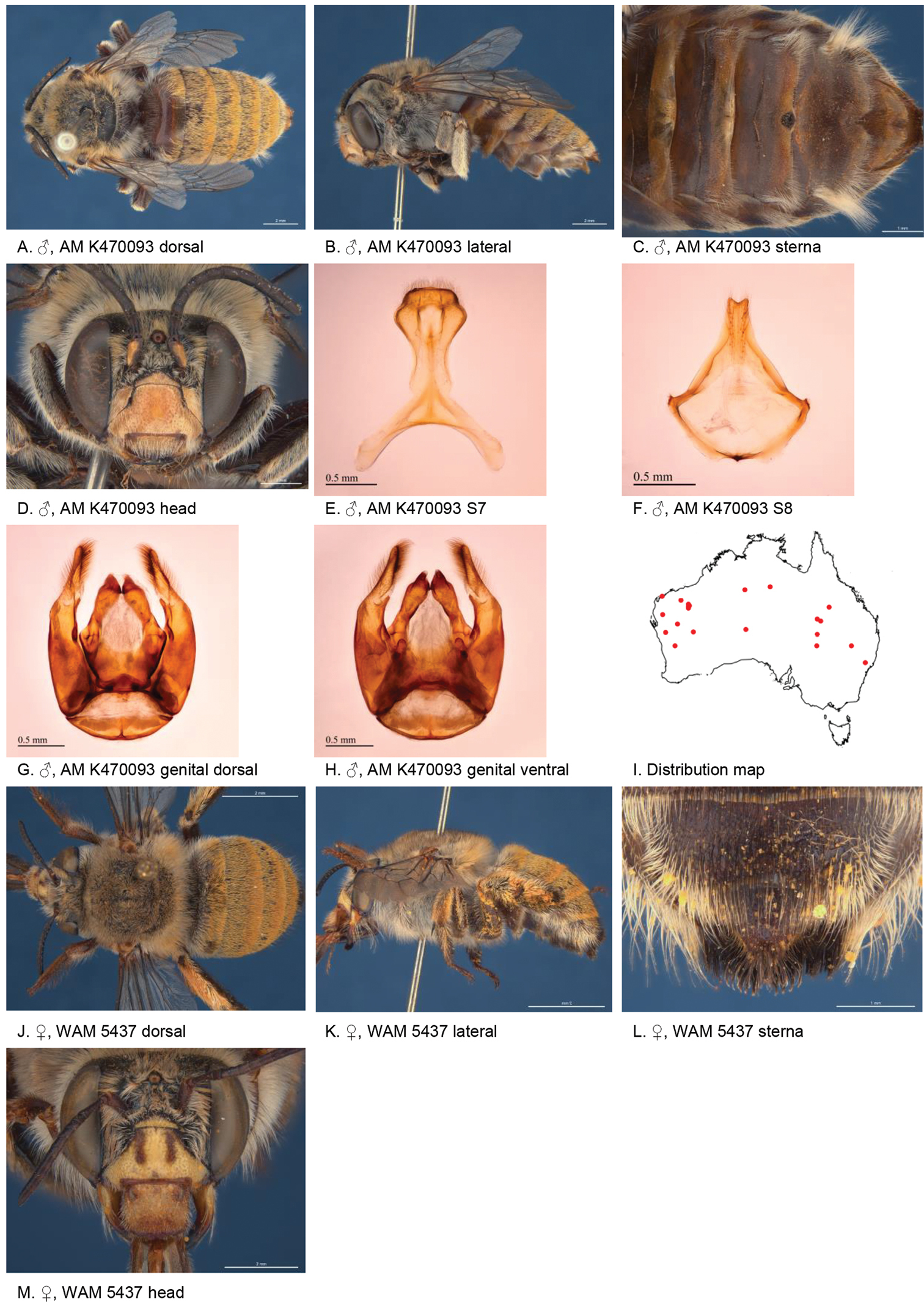

Scientific classification
- Kingdom: Animalia
- Phylum: Arthropoda
- Clade: Pancrustacea
- Class: Insecta
- Order: Hymenoptera
- Family: Apidae
- Genus: Amegilla
- Species: A. calva

Binomial name
- Amegilla calva (Rayment, 1935)

Synonyms
- Amegilla (Asaropoda) paracalva Brooks, 1993

= Amegilla calva =

Species of bee

Amegilla calva or Amegilla (Asaropoda) calva is a species of digger bee. It is endemic to Australia. It was described in 1935 by Australian entomologist Tarlton Rayment.

== Description ==
The body length is 15–16 mm, forewing length 10–11 mm, head width 5 mm.

== Distribution and habitat ==
The species has a wide range across central Australia. The type locality is Davis Creek in New South Wales.

== Behaviour ==
The bees are flying mellivores. Flowering plants visited by the bees include Eremophila, Trichodesma and Cassia species.
