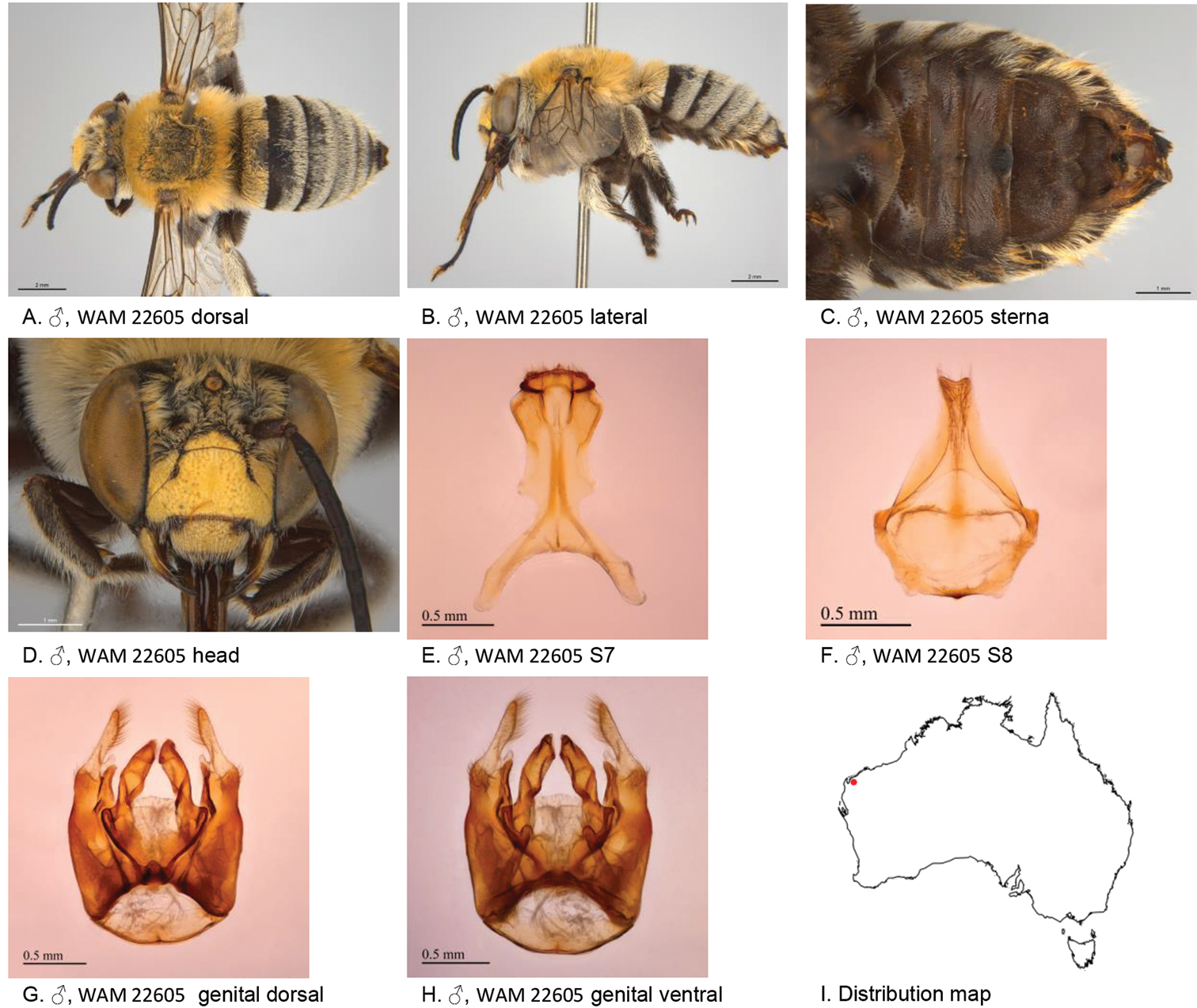

Scientific classification
- Kingdom: Animalia
- Phylum: Arthropoda
- Clade: Pancrustacea
- Class: Insecta
- Order: Hymenoptera
- Family: Apidae
- Genus: Amegilla
- Species: A. incognita

Binomial name
- Amegilla incognita Remko Leijs, 2020

= Amegilla incognita =

Species of bee

Amegilla incognita or Amegilla (Asaropoda) incognita is a species of digger bee. It is endemic to Australia. It was described in 2020 by entomologist Remko Leijs.

== Etymology ==
The specific epithet incognita (Latin: ‘unknown’) refers to the previous lack of recognition of the sole specimen as a new species.

== Description ==
The body length is 14 mm, forewing length 9.2 mm, head width 4.4 mm.

== Distribution and habitat ==
The species occurs in north-west Western Australia. The male holotype was collected some 88 km south of Onslow.

== Behaviour ==
Flowering plants visited by the bees include Trichodesma species.
