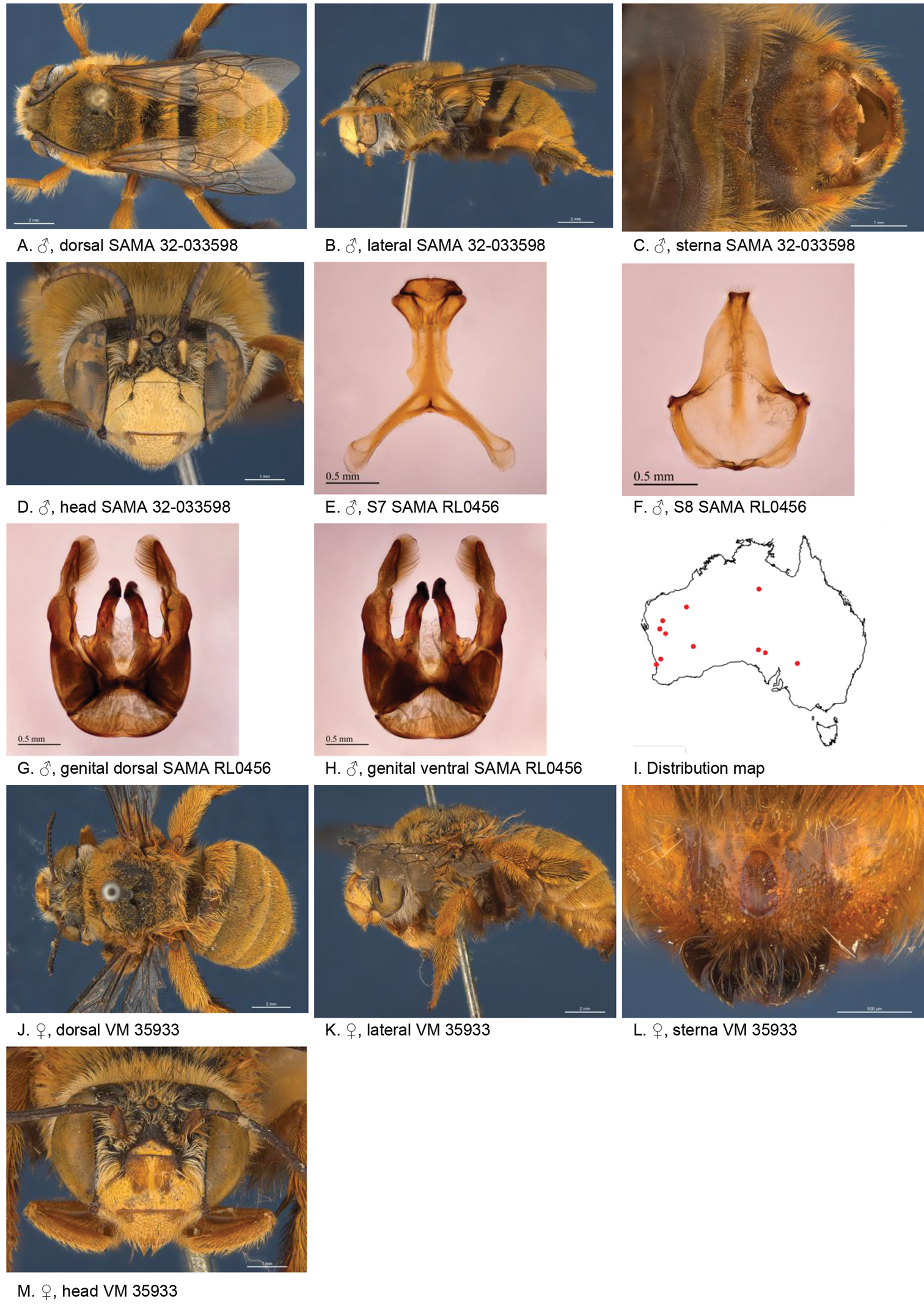

Scientific classification
- Kingdom: Animalia
- Phylum: Arthropoda
- Clade: Pancrustacea
- Class: Insecta
- Order: Hymenoptera
- Family: Apidae
- Genus: Amegilla
- Species: A. albigenella

Binomial name
- Amegilla albigenella Michener, 1965

Synonyms
- Asaropoda albigena Rayment, 1931

= Amegilla albigenella =

Species of bee

Amegilla albigenella or Amegilla (Asaropoda) albigenella is a species of digger bee. It is endemic to Australia. It was described in 1965 by entomologist Charles Duncan Michener.

== Description ==
The body length is 14 mm, forewing length 10–11 mm, head width 5 mm.

== Distribution and habitat ==
The species occurs in Western Australia, South Australia and the Northern Territory. The holotype was collected at Landor Station in the Gascoyne region.

== Behaviour ==
Flowering plants visited by the bees include Eremophila and Eucalyptus species.
