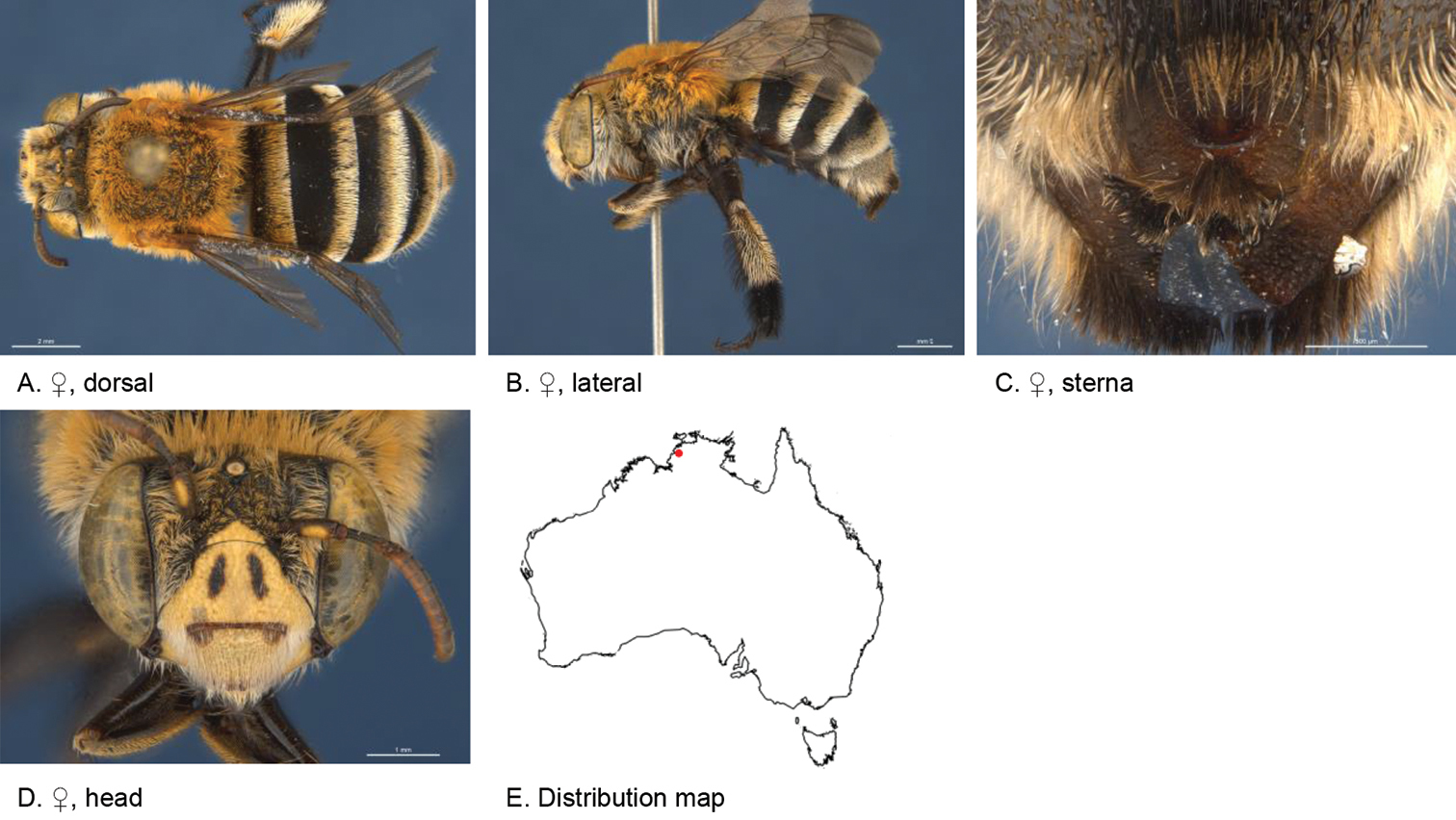

Scientific classification
- Kingdom: Animalia
- Phylum: Arthropoda
- Clade: Pancrustacea
- Class: Insecta
- Order: Hymenoptera
- Family: Apidae
- Genus: Amegilla
- Species: A. youngi

Binomial name
- Amegilla youngi Remko Leijs, 2020

= Amegilla youngi =

Species of bee

Amegilla youngi or Amegilla (Asaropoda) youngi is a species of digger bee. It is endemic to Australia. It was described in 2020 by entomologist Remko Leijs.

== Etymology ==
The specific epithet youngi honours Andy Young, the collector of the sole specimen, for his contribution to Amegilla taxonomy.

== Description ==
The body length of the female holotype is 13 mm, forewing length 9.1 mm, head width 4.5 mm.

== Distribution and habitat ==
The species occurs in the Top End of the Northern Territory. The holotype was collected at Litchfield.
