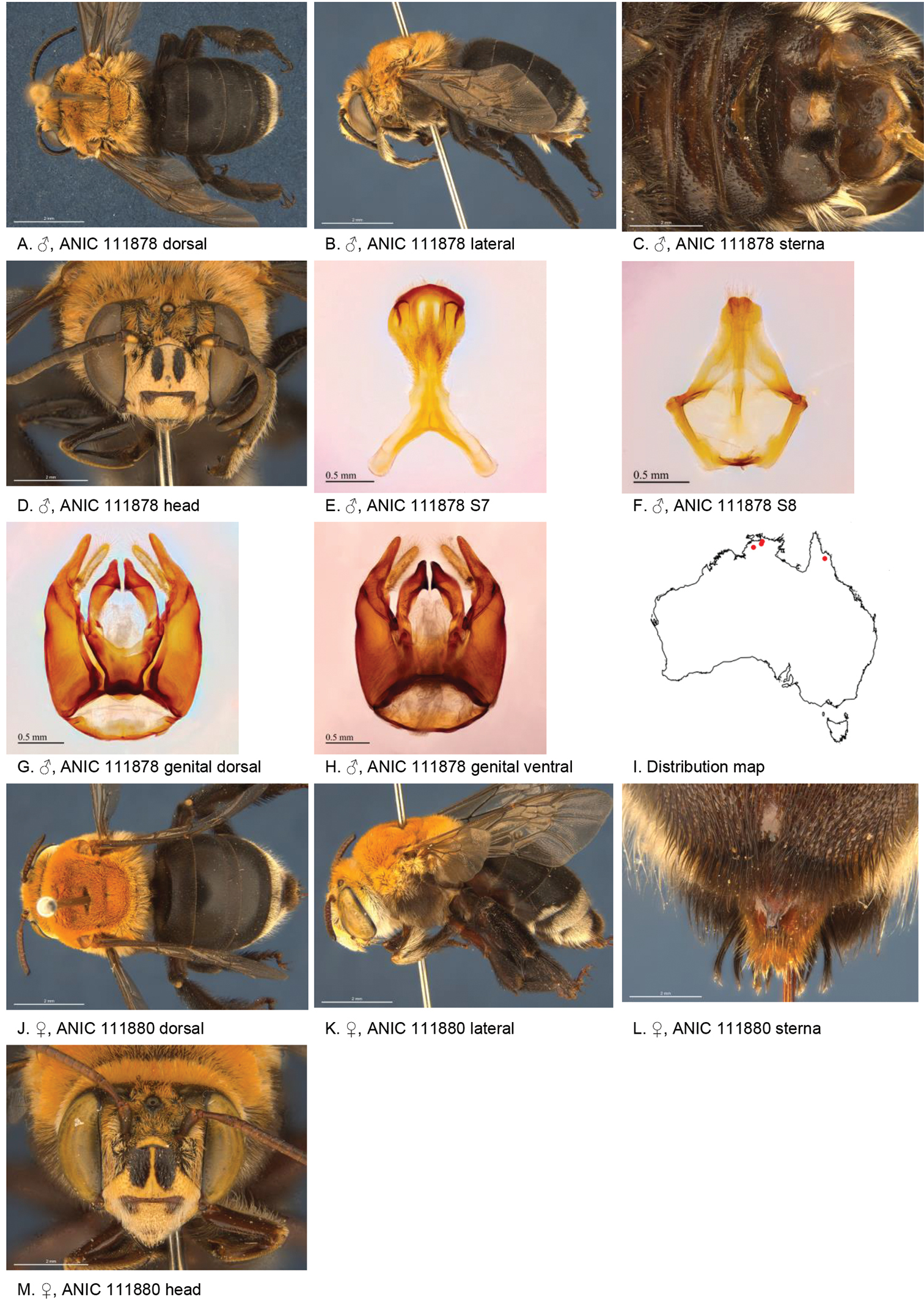

Scientific classification
- Kingdom: Animalia
- Phylum: Arthropoda
- Clade: Pancrustacea
- Class: Insecta
- Order: Hymenoptera
- Family: Apidae
- Genus: Amegilla
- Species: A. epaphrodita

Binomial name
- Amegilla epaphrodita Brooks, 1988

= Amegilla epaphrodita =

Species of bee

Amegilla epaphrodita or Amegilla (Asaropoda) epaphrodita is a species of digger bee. It is endemic to Australia. It was described in 1988 by entomologist Robert Brooks.

== Description ==
The body length of the male allotype is 17 mm, forewing length 11.1 mm, head width 5.1 mm.

== Distribution and habitat ==
The species occurs in the Top End of the Northern Territory. The type locality of the female holotype is 15 km east of Mount Cahill; that of the male allotype is believed to be Ubirr Rock, both in Kakadu National Park.

== Behaviour ==
The bees are flying mellivores.
