= Amegilla murrayensis =

Scientific classification
- Kingdom: Animalia
- Phylum: Arthropoda
- Clade: Pancrustacea
- Class: Insecta
- Order: Hymenoptera
- Family: Apidae
- Genus: Amegilla
- Species: A. murrayensis

Binomial name
- Amegilla murrayensis (Rayment, 1935)

Synonyms
- Anthophora murrayensis Rayment, 1939; Amegilla murrayensis (Rayment) Michener, 1965; Amegilla (Zonamegilla) murrayensis (Rayment) Brooks, 1988; Anthophora longula Rayment, 1947; Amegilla longula (Rayment) Michener, 1965; Amegilla (Zonamegilla) longula (Rayment) Brooks, 1988; Anthophora subsalteri Rayment, 1947; Amegilla subsalteri (Rayment) Michener, 1965; Amegilla (Zonamegilla) subsalteri (Rayment) Brooks, 1988

Species of bee

Amegilla murrayensis or Amegilla (Zonamegilla) murrayensis is a species of digger bee. It is endemic to Australia. It was described in 1935 by Australian entomologist Tarlton Rayment, redescribed in 2017 by Remko Leys, Michael Batley and Katja Hogendoorn, and synonymised with A. longula.

== Description ==
The body length is 11–12 mm, forewing length 8 mm. It is a relatively small species, with pale yellow face markings and narrow, usually pale blue, apical fur bands.

== Distribution and habitat ==
The species is widespread across mainland Australia. Type localities include Gunbower, Victoria and Orroroo, South Australia.

== Behaviour ==
The adults are flying mellivores that nest gregariously.

In his book A Cluster of Bees, Tarlton Rayment commented:

"At Gunbower, Victoria, I discovered the nests of the smallest Anthophora yet recorded for Australia, the males being only 8 mm in length. They are close to A. lilacina Ckll., and I propose the name A. murrayensis for this new bee, and append a description of the species. The nests were simple galleries in the mud-bricks of a pisé residence. The males kept up a continual hovering before the entrances, and ever and anon one would enter a gallery, and remain inside for a few minutes, and then reappear to resume its flight. I believe the nuptials are consummated in the secrecy of the nest."
