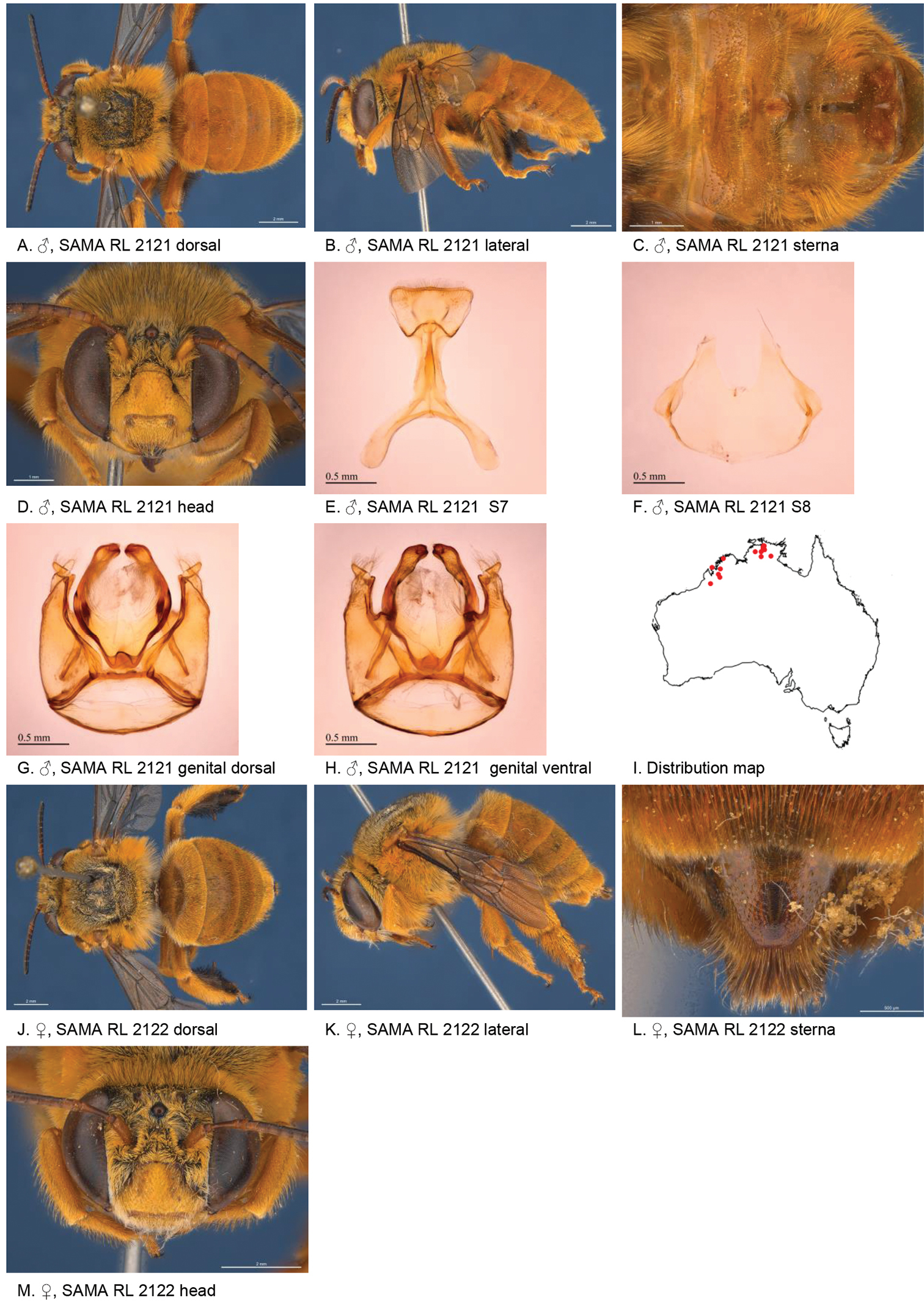

Scientific classification
- Kingdom: Animalia
- Phylum: Arthropoda
- Clade: Pancrustacea
- Class: Insecta
- Order: Hymenoptera
- Family: Apidae
- Genus: Amegilla
- Species: A. crenata

Binomial name
- Amegilla crenata Remko Leijs, 2020

= Amegilla crenata =

Species of bee

Amegilla crenata or Amegilla (Asaropoda) crenata is a species of digger bee. It is endemic to Australia. It was described in 2020 by entomologist Remko Leijs.

== Etymology ==
The specific epithet crenata is an anatomical reference.

== Description ==
The body length is 13–16 mm, forewing length 10 mm, head width 5 mm.

== Distribution and habitat ==
The species occurs in Western Australia and the Northern Territory. The male holotype and female allotype were collected at Wongalara Sanctuary.

== Behaviour ==
Flowering plants visited by the bees include Trichodesma, Melastoma, Calytrix and Acacia species.
