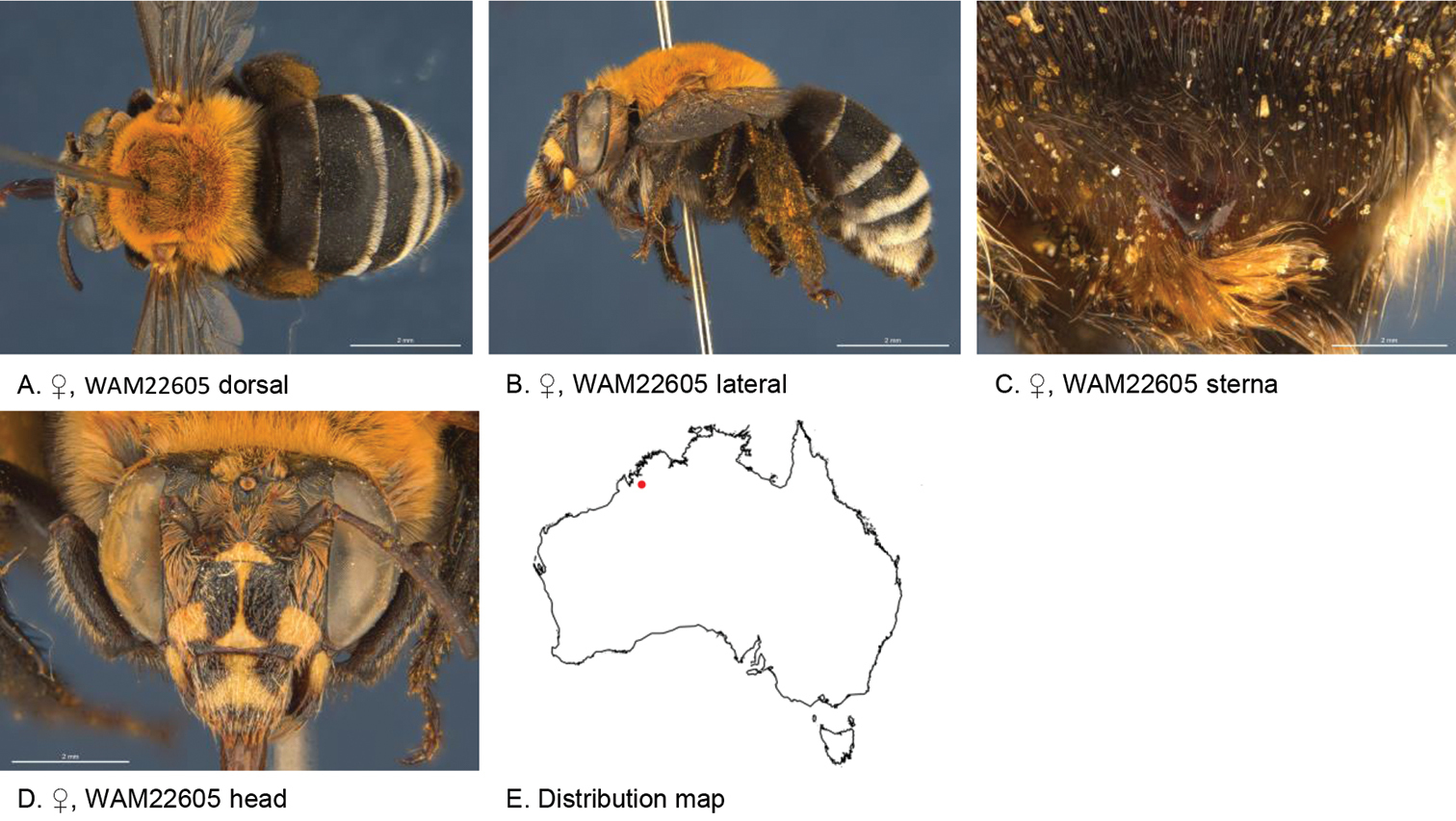

Scientific classification
- Kingdom: Animalia
- Phylum: Arthropoda
- Clade: Pancrustacea
- Class: Insecta
- Order: Hymenoptera
- Family: Apidae
- Genus: Amegilla
- Species: A. houstoni

Binomial name
- Amegilla houstoni Brooks, 1988

= Amegilla houstoni =

Species of bee

Amegilla houstoni or Amegilla (Asaropoda) houstoni is a species of digger bee. It is endemic to Australia. It was described in 1988 by entomologist Robert Brooks.

== Description ==
The species is known only from the female holotype. It has metasomal terga with black fur and white posterior hair bands.

== Distribution and habitat ==
The species occurs in the Kimberley region of northern Western Australia. The type locality is the top of the Napier Range, Windjana Gorge.

== Behaviour ==
The bees are flying mellivores. Flowering plants visited by the bees include Trichodesma species.
