= Amegilla karlba =

Scientific classification
- Kingdom: Animalia
- Phylum: Arthropoda
- Clade: Pancrustacea
- Class: Insecta
- Order: Hymenoptera
- Family: Apidae
- Genus: Amegilla
- Species: A. karlba

Binomial name
- Amegilla karlba Remko Leijs, Batley & Hogendoorn, 2017

Species of bee

Amegilla karlba or Amegilla (Zonamegilla) karlba is a species of digger bee. It is endemic to Australia. It was described in 2017 by entomologists Remko Leijs, Michael Batley and Katja Hogendoorn.

== Etymology ==
The specific epithet karlba (Kuninjku dialect: “yellow ochre”) refers to the colour of the tergal fur bands.

== Description ==
The body length of the species is 11–13 mm, forewing length 8–9 mm. The metasomal fur bands of both sexes are yellow ochre in colour.

== Distribution and habitat ==
The species occurs in the tropical Kimberley regions of northern Western Australia, and Kakadu National Park and Arnhem Land in the Top End of the Northern Territory. The holotype female and allotype male were collected near Mount Cahill.
