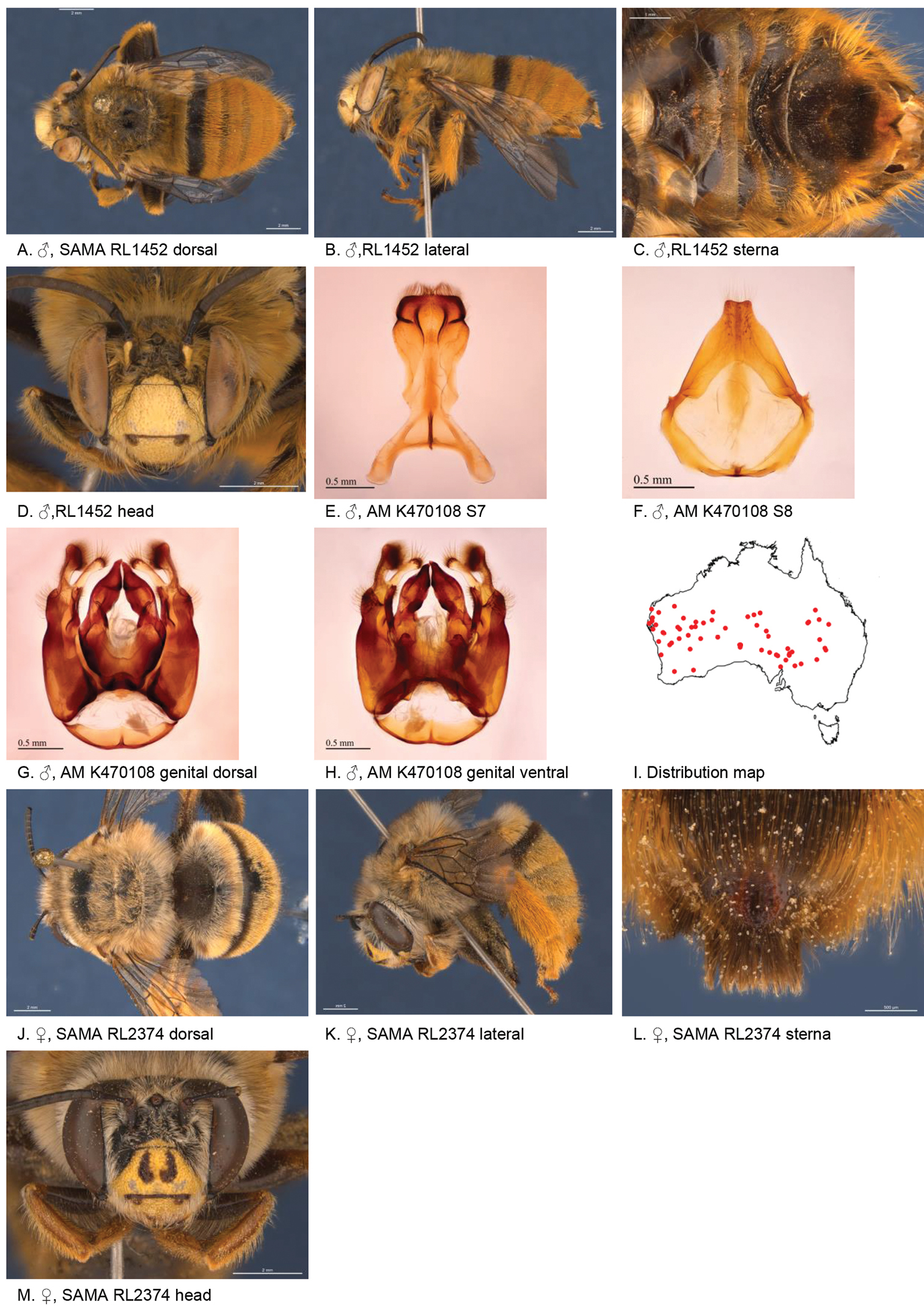

Scientific classification
- Kingdom: Animalia
- Phylum: Arthropoda
- Clade: Pancrustacea
- Class: Insecta
- Order: Hymenoptera
- Family: Apidae
- Genus: Amegilla
- Species: A. scoparia

Binomial name
- Amegilla scoparia Remko Leijs, 2020

= Amegilla scoparia =

Species of bee

Amegilla scoparia or Amegilla (Asaropoda) scoparia is a species of digger bee. It is endemic to Australia. It was described in 2020 by entomologist Remko Leijs.

== Etymology ==
The specific epithet scoparia refers to the wide brush of stiff setae on the male.

== Description ==
The body length is 15–17 mm, forewing length 11 mm, head width 5–6 mm.

== Distribution and habitat ==
The species occurs widely across central Australia, with the northern limit of the range just north of the Tropic of Capricorn. The male holotype was collected on Beltana Station and the female allotype at Andamooka Homestead, both in South Australia.

== Behaviour ==
Flowering plants visited by the bees include Cassia, Senna, Petalostylis, Eremophila, Goodenia, Trichodesma, Keraudrenia and Tecoma species.
