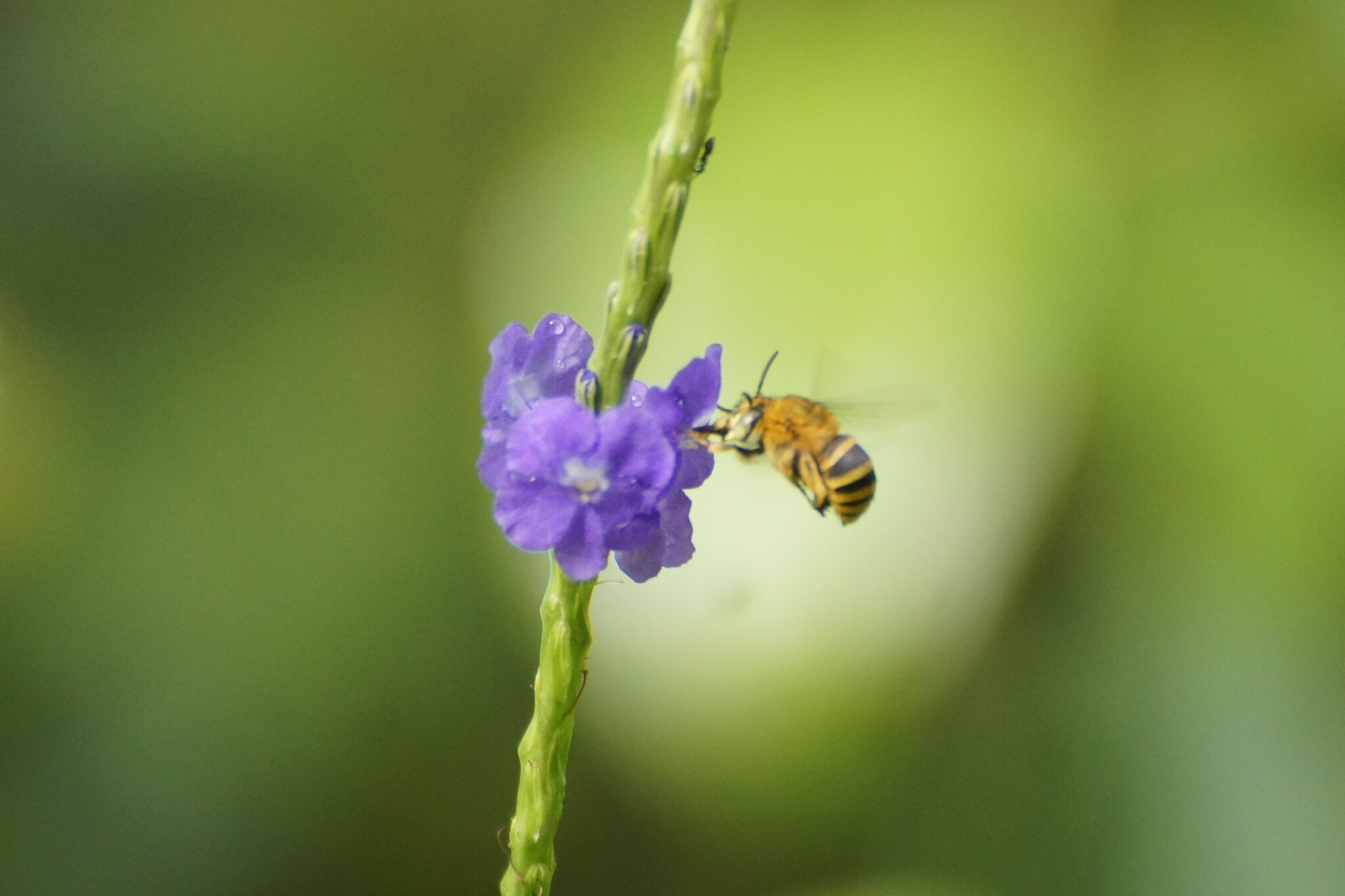

Scientific classification
- Kingdom: Animalia
- Phylum: Arthropoda
- Clade: Pancrustacea
- Class: Insecta
- Order: Hymenoptera
- Family: Apidae
- Genus: Amegilla
- Species: A. paeninsulae

Binomial name
- Amegilla paeninsulae Remko Leijs, Batley & Hogendoorn, 2017

= Amegilla paeninsulae =

Species of bee

Amegilla paeninsulae or Amegilla (Zonamegilla) paeninsulae is a species of digger bee. It is endemic to Australia. It was described in 2017 by entomologists Remko Leijs, Michael Batley and Katja Hogendoorn.

== Etymology ==
The specific epithet paeninsulae refers to its distribution.

== Description ==
The body length of the species is 12–14 mm, forewing length 8–9 mm. The bees have orange tergal fur bands, sometimes with green iridescence, and orange fur on the scutum.

== Distribution and habitat ==
The species occurs on the Cape York Peninsula of Far North Queensland, where it occupies patches of tropical rainforest. The holotype female and allotype male were collected north of Bamaga.
