= Amegilla thorogoodi =

Scientific classification
- Kingdom: Animalia
- Phylum: Arthropoda
- Clade: Pancrustacea
- Class: Insecta
- Order: Hymenoptera
- Family: Apidae
- Genus: Amegilla
- Species: A. thorogoodi

Binomial name
- Amegilla thorogoodi (Rayment, 1939)

Synonyms
- Anthophora thorogoodi Rayment, 1939; Amegilla thorogoodi (Rayment) Michener, 1965; Amegilla (Zonamegilla) thorogoodi (Rayment) Brooks, 1988

Species of bee

Amegilla thorogoodi or Amegilla (Zonamegilla) thorogoodi is a species of digger bee. It is native to Australia and New Guinea. It was described in 1939 by Australian entomologist Tarlton Rayment.

== Description ==
The body length of the species is 13 mm, forewing length 8–9 mm. The scutal fur is brown, the apical tergal fur bands mainly blue.

== Distribution and habitat ==
The species occurs in the tropics and subtropics of northern and eastern coastal Queensland as well as in southern New Guinea. The type locality is Proserpine.

== Behaviour ==
The adults are flying mellivores.
