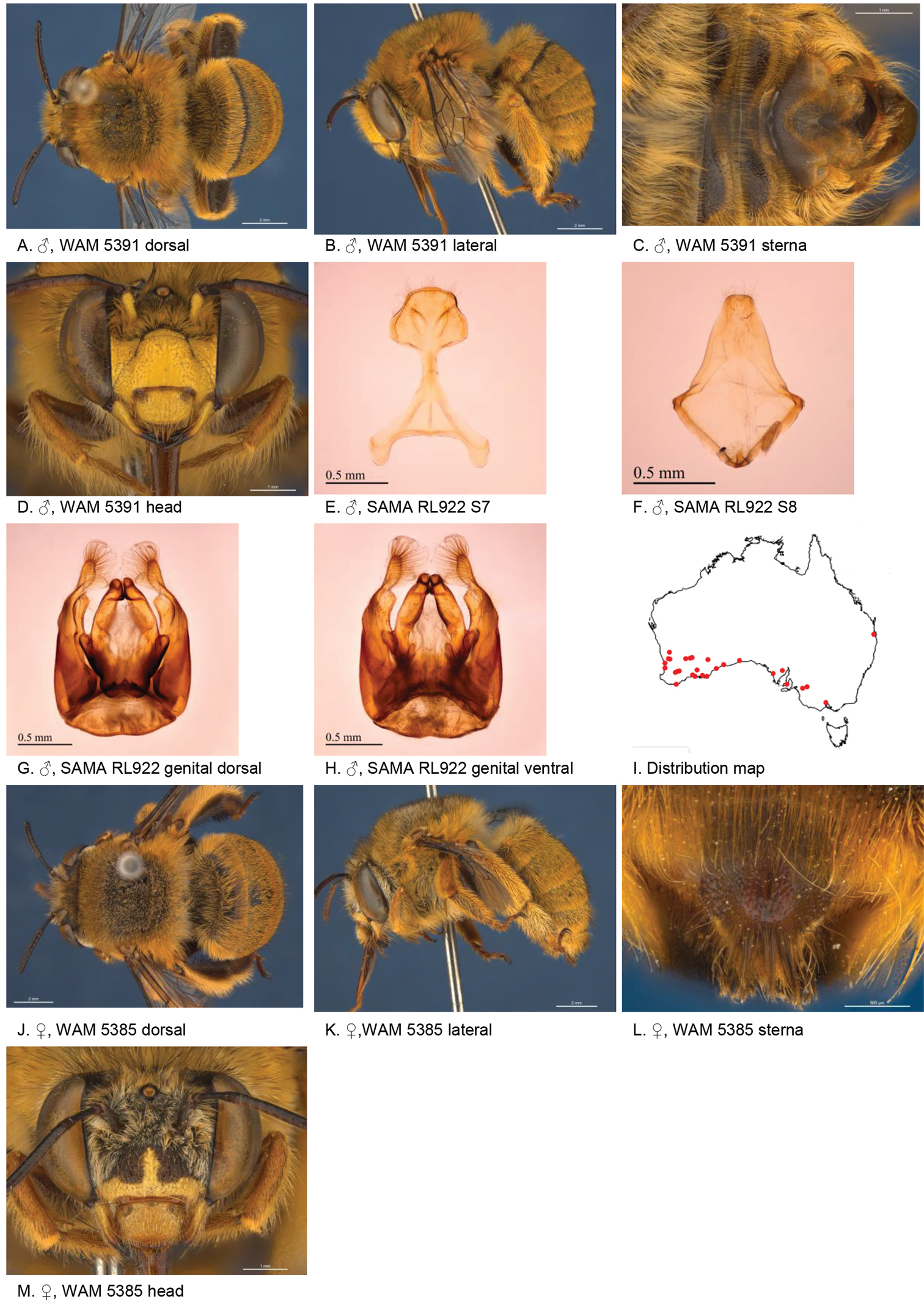

Scientific classification
- Kingdom: Animalia
- Phylum: Arthropoda
- Clade: Pancrustacea
- Class: Insecta
- Order: Hymenoptera
- Family: Apidae
- Genus: Amegilla
- Species: A. flava

Binomial name
- Amegilla flava (Friese, 1911)

Synonyms
- Anthophora flava Friese, 1911; Asaropoda cygni Rayment, 1931; Asaropoda rickae Rayment, 1951

= Amegilla flava =

Species of bee

Amegilla flava or Amegilla (Asaropoda) flava is a species of digger bee. It is endemic to Australia. It was described in 1911 by German entomologist Heinrich Friese.

== Description ==
The body length is 12–13 mm, forewing length 9 mm, head width 5 mm.

== Distribution and habitat ==
The species occurs across southern temperate mainland Australia. Type localities include Swan River and Bolgart in Western Australia.

== Behaviour ==
Flowering plants visited by the bees include Eremophila, Eucalyptus and Melaleuca species.
