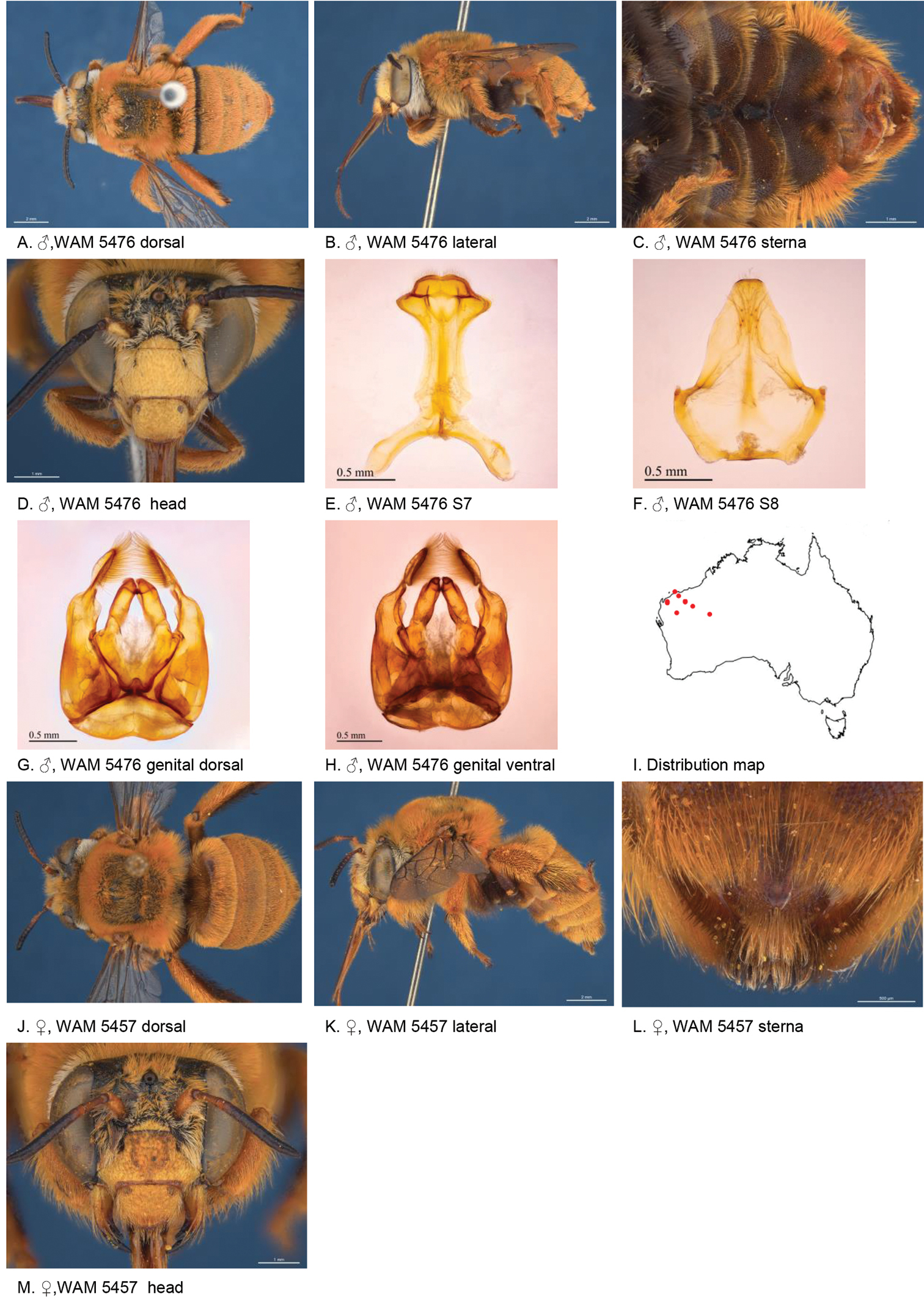

Scientific classification
- Kingdom: Animalia
- Phylum: Arthropoda
- Clade: Pancrustacea
- Class: Insecta
- Order: Hymenoptera
- Family: Apidae
- Genus: Amegilla
- Species: A. aurantia

Binomial name
- Amegilla aurantia Remko Leijs, 2020

= Amegilla aurantia =

Species of bee

Amegilla aurantia or Amegilla (Asaropoda) aurantia is a species of digger bee. It is endemic to Australia. It was described in 2020 by entomologist Remko Leijs.

== Etymology ==
The specific epithet aurantia refers to the orange general appearance of the bees.

== Description ==
The body length is 13–14 mm, forewing length 9–10 mm, head width 4–5 mm.

== Distribution and habitat ==
The species occurs in north-west Western Australia. The male holotype was collected at Mount Augustus, the female allotype at Yampire Gorge.

== Behaviour ==
Flowering plants visited by the bees include Eremophila and Eucalyptus species.
