= Amegilla alpha =

Scientific classification
- Kingdom: Animalia
- Phylum: Arthropoda
- Clade: Pancrustacea
- Class: Insecta
- Order: Hymenoptera
- Family: Apidae
- Genus: Amegilla
- Species: A. alpha

Binomial name
- Amegilla alpha (Cockerell, 1904)

Synonyms
- Sarapoda bombiformis var. α Smith, 1854; Saropoda alpha Cockerell, 1904; Amegilla (Asaropoda) alpha (Cockerell) Michener, 1965

Species of bee

Amegilla alpha or Amegilla (Zonamegilla) alpha is a species of digger bee. It is endemic to Australia. It was described in 1904 by British-American entomologist Theodore Dru Alison Cockerell.

== Description ==
The body length is 11–14 mm, forewing length 7–9 mm. Both sexes are distinguishable from other Australian Zonamegilla species by the orange fur covering the upper surface of the metasoma.

== Distribution and habitat ==
The species occurs in tropical areas of north-western Australia, including the Kimberley region of Western Australia and the adjacent part of the Northern Territory. The type locality is Jasper Gorge, 54 km north-west of Victoria River Downs.

== Behaviour ==
The adults are flying mellivores.
