= Amegilla viridicingulata =

Scientific classification
- Kingdom: Animalia
- Phylum: Arthropoda
- Clade: Pancrustacea
- Class: Insecta
- Order: Hymenoptera
- Family: Apidae
- Genus: Amegilla
- Species: A. viridicingulata

Binomial name
- Amegilla viridicingulata Remko Leijs, Batley & Hogendoorn, 2017

Species of bee

Amegilla viridicingulata or Amegilla (Zonamegilla) viridicingulata is a species of digger bee. It is endemic to Australia. It was described in 2017 by entomologists Remko Leijs, Michael Batley and Katja Hogendoorn.

== Etymology ==
The specific epithet viridicingulata (Latin: “green-banded”) refers to its colouration.

== Description ==
The body length of the species is 11–12 mm, forewing length 8 mm. The bees have green iridescence on the tergal fur bands, orange-brown fur on the scutum, and orange fur on the hind legs.

== Distribution and habitat ==
The species occurs in coastal north-eastern Queensland. The holotype female and allotype male were collected at Cooktown.
