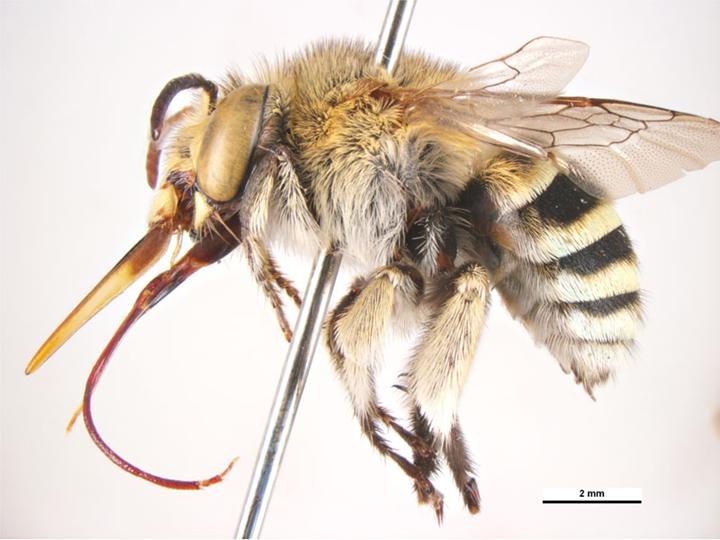
- Male

Scientific classification
- Kingdom: Animalia
- Phylum: Arthropoda
- Clade: Pancrustacea
- Class: Insecta
- Order: Hymenoptera
- Family: Apidae
- Genus: Amegilla
- Species: A. adelaidae

Binomial name
- Amegilla adelaidae (Cockerell, 1905)

Synonyms
- Anthophora adelaidae Cockerell, 1905; Amegilla adelaidae (Cockerell) Michener, 1965; Amegilla (Zonamegilla) adelaidae (Cockerell) Brooks, 1988

= Amegilla adelaidae =

Species of bee

Amegilla adelaidae or Amegilla (Zonamegilla) adelaidae is a species of digger bee. It is endemic to Australia. It was described in 1905 by British-American entomologist Theodore Dru Alison Cockerell.

== Description ==
The body length is 12–13 mm, forewing length 8 mm.

== Distribution and habitat ==
The species occurs mainly in tropical and subtropical areas of Australia, including the arid zone. The type locality is the Adelaide River in the Top End of the Northern Territory.

== Behaviour ==
The adults are flying mellivores. Flowering plants visited by the bees include Plectranthus and Ricinus species.
