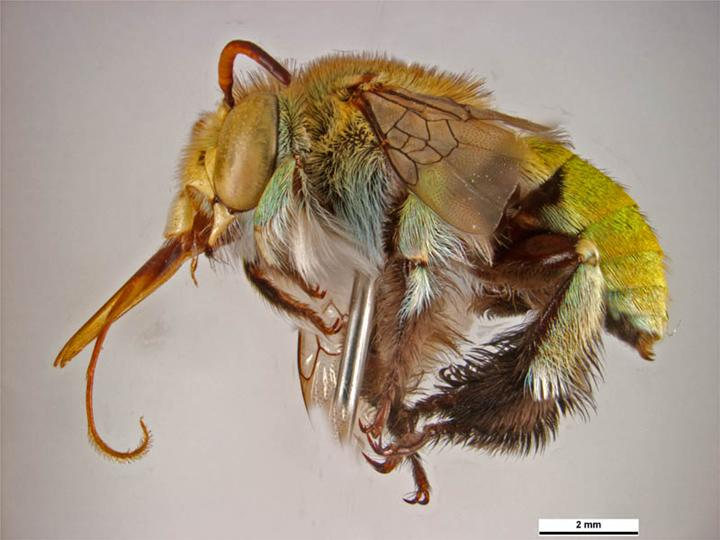
- Female

Scientific classification
- Kingdom: Animalia
- Phylum: Arthropoda
- Clade: Pancrustacea
- Class: Insecta
- Order: Hymenoptera
- Family: Apidae
- Genus: Amegilla
- Species: A. aeruginosa

Binomial name
- Amegilla aeruginosa (Smith, 1854)

Synonyms
- Anthophora aeruginosa Smith, 1854; Amegilla aeruginosa (Smith) Michener, 1965; Amegilla (Notomegilla) aeruginosa (Smith) Brooks, 1988; Anthophora kershawi Rayment, 1944; Anthophora sybilae Rayment, 1944; Amegilla sybilae (Rayment) Michener; Amegilla (Notomegilla) sybilae (Rayment) Brooks, 1988

= Amegilla aeruginosa =

Species of bee

Amegilla aeruginosa or Amegilla (Notomegilla) aeruginosa is a species of digger bee. It is endemic to Australia. It was described in 1854 by English entomologist Frederick Smith.

== Description ==
The body length is 10 mm, forewing length 8–9 mm. The species is distinguished from Australian congeners by the green- or bronze-coloured fur covering most of the upper surface.

== Distribution and habitat ==
The species is widely distributed across the coastal and subcoastal tropics and subtropics of northern and north-eastern Australia.

== Behaviour ==
The adults are flying mellivores. Flowering plants visited by the bees include Solanum species.
