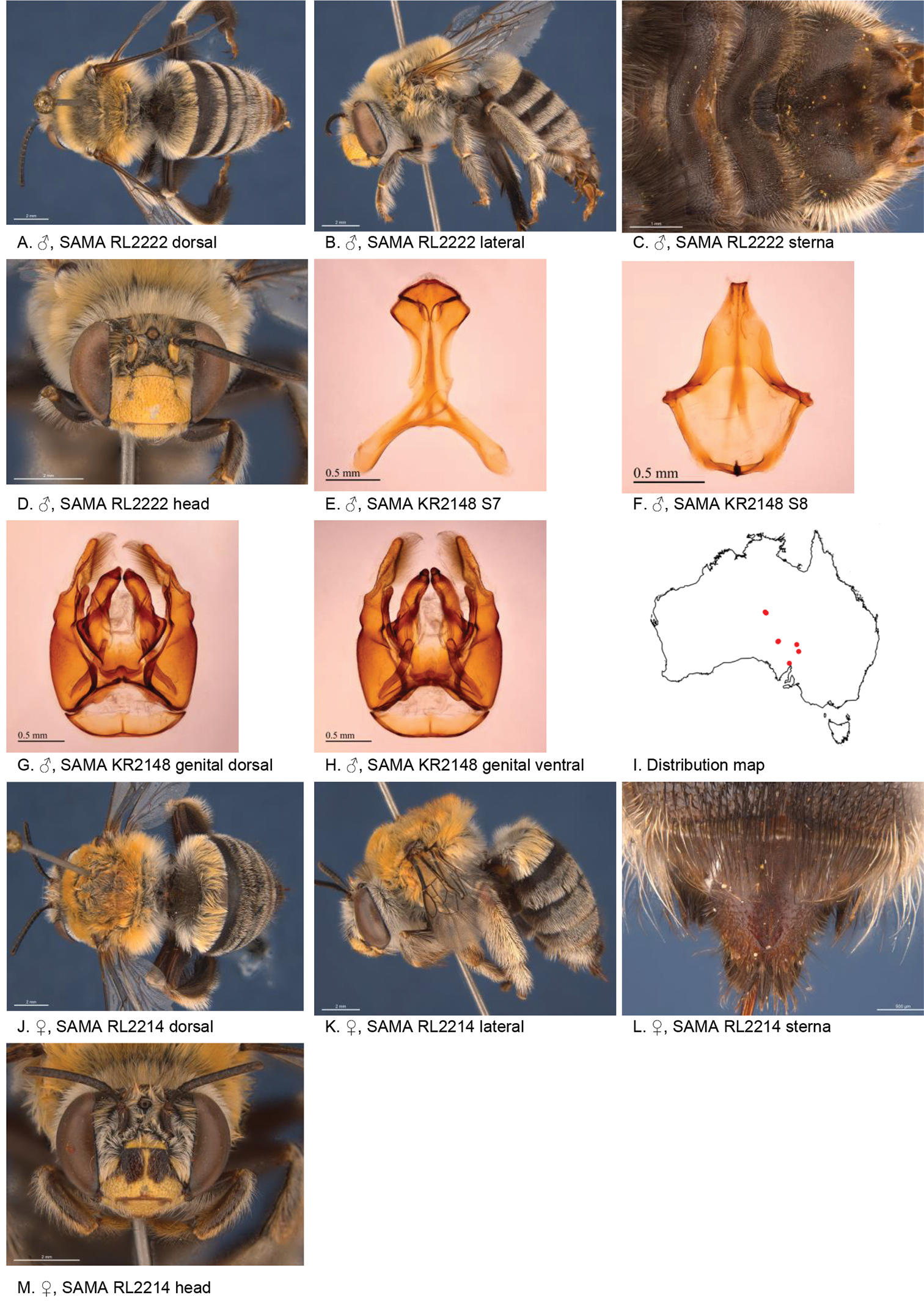

Scientific classification
- Kingdom: Animalia
- Phylum: Arthropoda
- Clade: Pancrustacea
- Class: Insecta
- Order: Hymenoptera
- Family: Apidae
- Genus: Amegilla
- Species: A. griseocincta

Binomial name
- Amegilla griseocincta Remko Leijs, 2020

= Amegilla griseocincta =

Species of bee

Amegilla griseocincta or Amegilla (Asaropoda) griseocincta is a species of digger bee. It is endemic to Australia. It was described in 2020 by entomologist Remko Leijs.

== Etymology ==
The specific epithet griseocincta refers to the greyish hair bands on the metasomal terga.

== Description ==
The body length is 16–17 mm, forewing length 10–11 mm, head width 5–6 mm.

== Distribution and habitat ==
The species occurs in South Australia and the Northern Territory. The male holotype and female allotype were collected at Henbury Station.

== Behaviour ==
Flowering plants visited by the bees include Amyema and Eremophila species.
