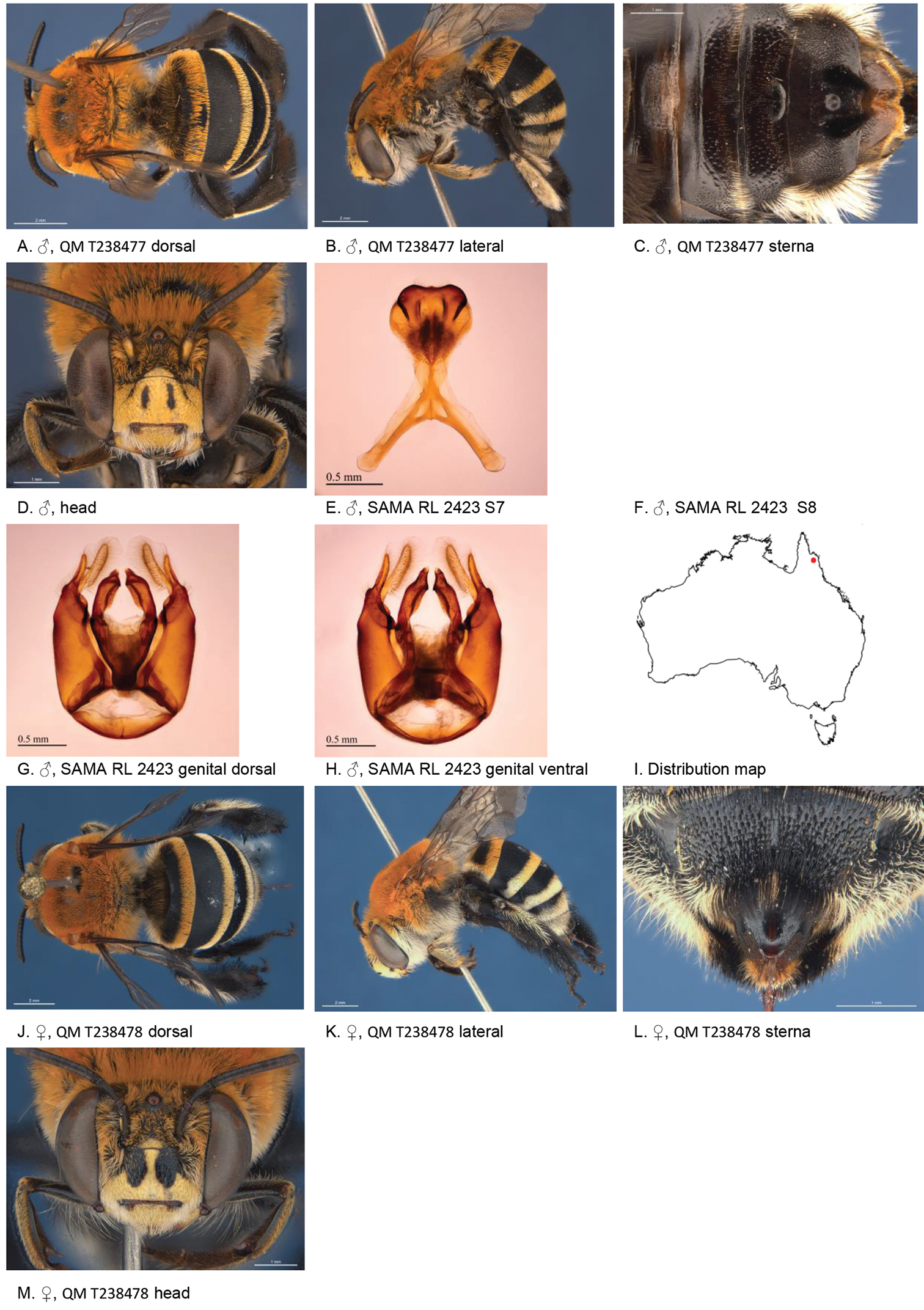

Scientific classification
- Kingdom: Animalia
- Phylum: Arthropoda
- Clade: Pancrustacea
- Class: Insecta
- Order: Hymenoptera
- Family: Apidae
- Genus: Amegilla
- Species: A. nitidiventris

Binomial name
- Amegilla nitidiventris Remko Leijs, 2020

= Amegilla nitidiventris =

Species of bee

Amegilla nitidiventris or Amegilla (Asaropoda) nitidiventris is a species of digger bee. It is endemic to Australia. It was described in 2020 by entomologist Remko Leijs.

== Etymology ==
The specific epithet nitidiventris refers to the shiny black metasomal sterna of both sexes.

== Description ==
The body length is 12–15 mm, forewing length 9–10 mm, head width 4–5 mm.

== Distribution and habitat ==
The species occurs in Far North Queensland. The male holotype and female allotype were collected in the vicinity of Laura on the Cape York Peninsula.

== Behaviour ==
Flowering plants visited by the bees include Hibiscus and Turnera species.
