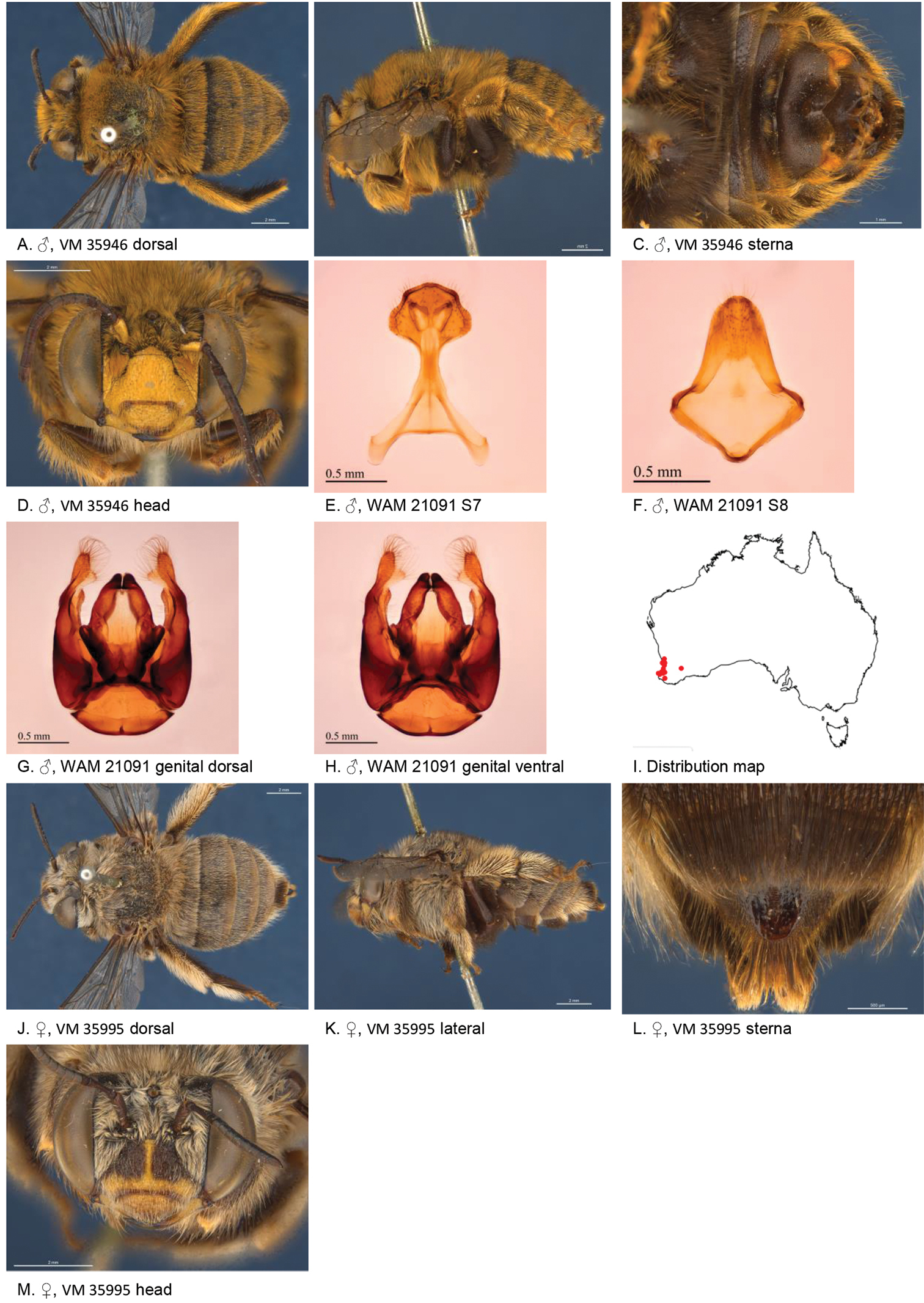

Scientific classification
- Kingdom: Animalia
- Phylum: Arthropoda
- Clade: Pancrustacea
- Class: Insecta
- Order: Hymenoptera
- Family: Apidae
- Genus: Amegilla
- Species: A. preissi

Binomial name
- Amegilla preissi (Cockerell, 1910)

Synonyms
- Anthophora preissi Cockerell, 1910; Asaropoda sordidula Rayment, 1931; Asaropoda sordida Rayment, 1931; Asaropoda grisescens Rayment, 1931

= Amegilla preissi =

Species of bee

Amegilla preissi or Amegilla (Asaropoda) preissi is a species of digger bee. It is endemic to Australia. It was described in 1910 by British-American entomologist Theodore Dru Alison Cockerell.

== Description ==
The body length is 13–15 mm, forewing length 10 mm, head width 5 mm.

== Distribution and habitat ==
The species occurs in south-west Western Australia in the Avon Wheatbelt, Jarrah Forest, Mallee, Swan Coastal Plain and Warren bioregions. Type localities include Swan River and Geraldton.

== Behaviour ==
Flowering plants visited by the bees include Corymbia calophylla.
