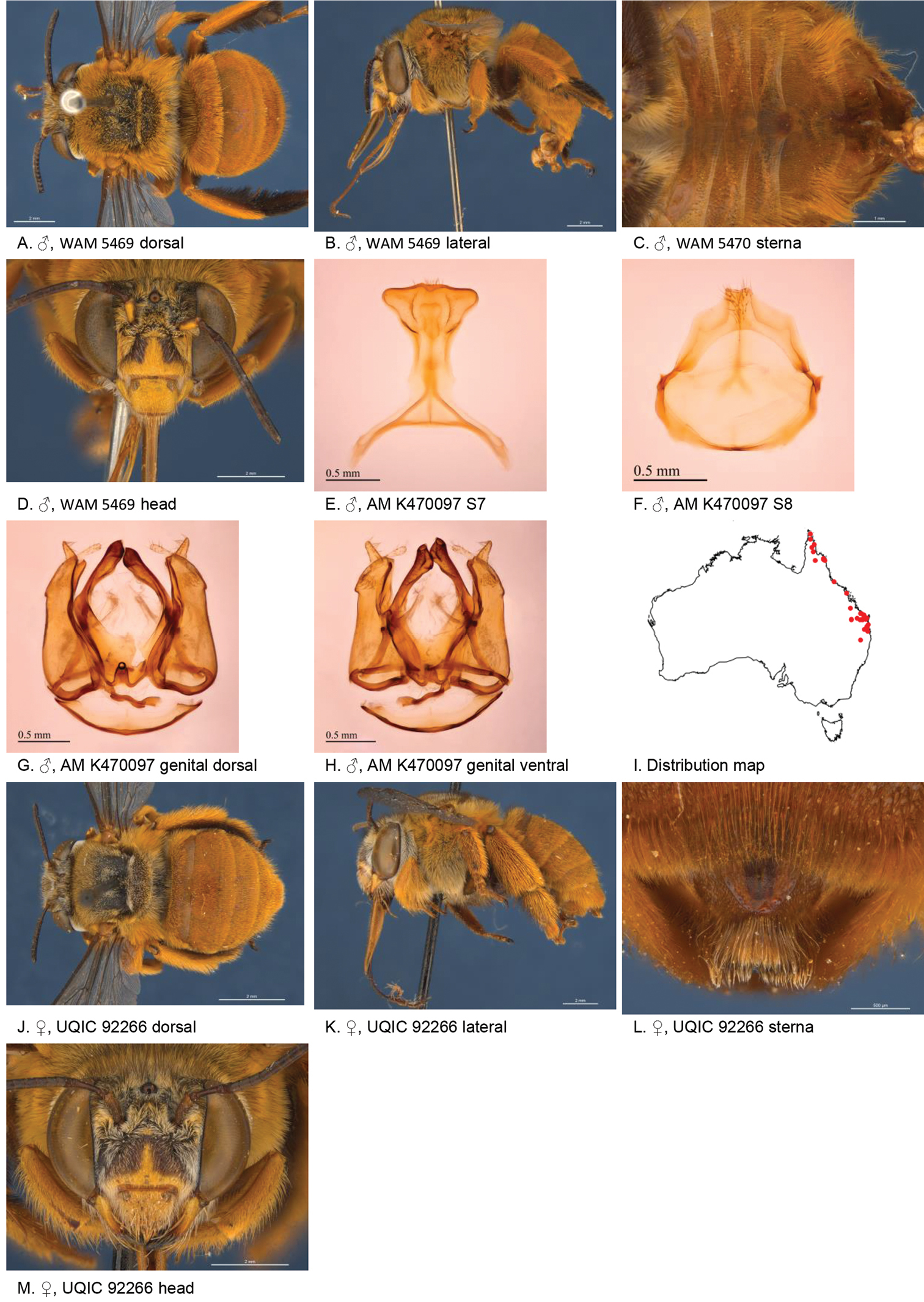

Scientific classification
- Kingdom: Animalia
- Phylum: Arthropoda
- Clade: Pancrustacea
- Class: Insecta
- Order: Hymenoptera
- Family: Apidae
- Genus: Amegilla
- Species: A. rhodoscymna

Binomial name
- Amegilla rhodoscymna (Cockerell, 1905)

Synonyms
- Anthophora rhodoscymna Cockerell, 1905; Anthophora rufescens Friese, 1911

= Amegilla rhodoscymna =

Species of bee

Amegilla rhodoscymna or Amegilla (Asaropoda) rhodoscymna is a species of digger bee. It is endemic to Australia. It was described in 1905 by British-American entomologist Theodore Dru Alison Cockerell.

== Description ==
The body length is 13–14 mm, forewing length 10–11 mm, head width 5–6 mm.

== Distribution and habitat ==
The species occurs along the east coast of Australia from the Cape York Peninsula southwards to northern New South Wales. The type locality is Mackay.

== Behaviour ==
The adults are flying mellivores. Flowering plants visited by the bees include Angophora and Xanthorrhoea species.

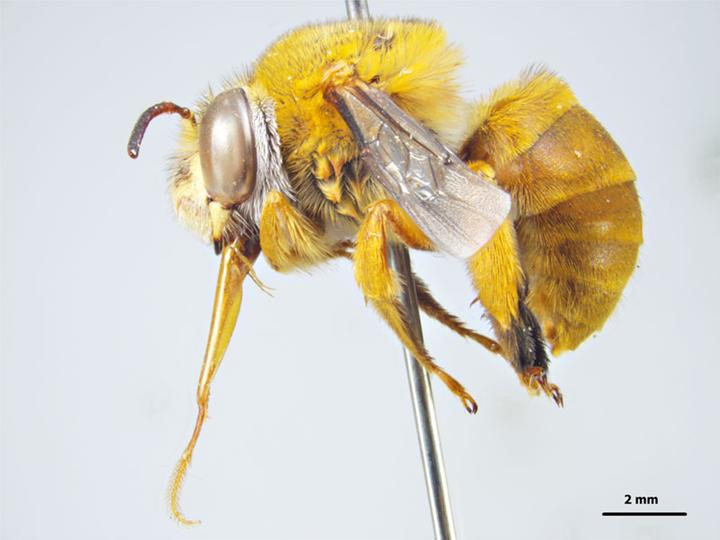
Male

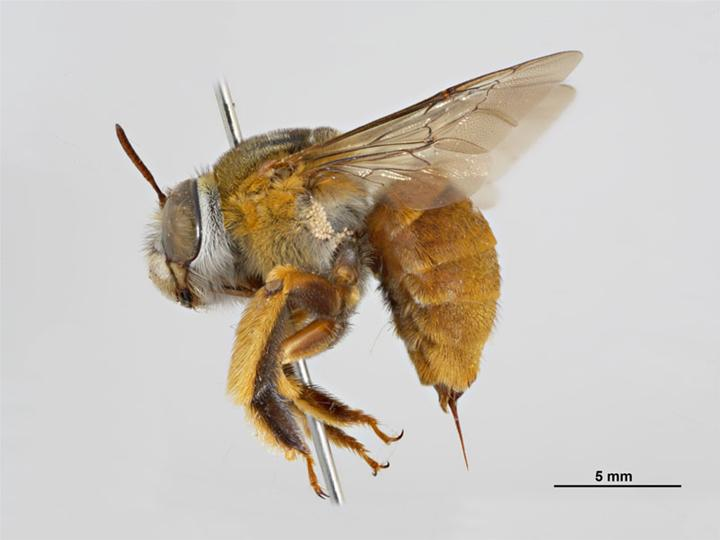
Female
