= Amegilla scymna =

Scientific classification
- Kingdom: Animalia
- Phylum: Arthropoda
- Clade: Pancrustacea
- Class: Insecta
- Order: Hymenoptera
- Family: Apidae
- Genus: Amegilla
- Species: A. scymna

Binomial name
- Amegilla scymna (Gribodo, 1893)

Synonyms
- Anthophora scymna Gribodo, 1893

Species of bee

Amegilla scymna or Amegilla (Asaropoda) scymna is a species of digger bee. It is endemic to Australia. It was described in 1893 by Italian entomologist Giovanni Gribodo.

== Distribution and habitat ==
Published localities include Adelaide in South Australia, and Waroona, Geraldton and Fremantle in Western Australia. The female holotype is from Queensland.

== Behaviour ==
The adults are flying mellivores.
