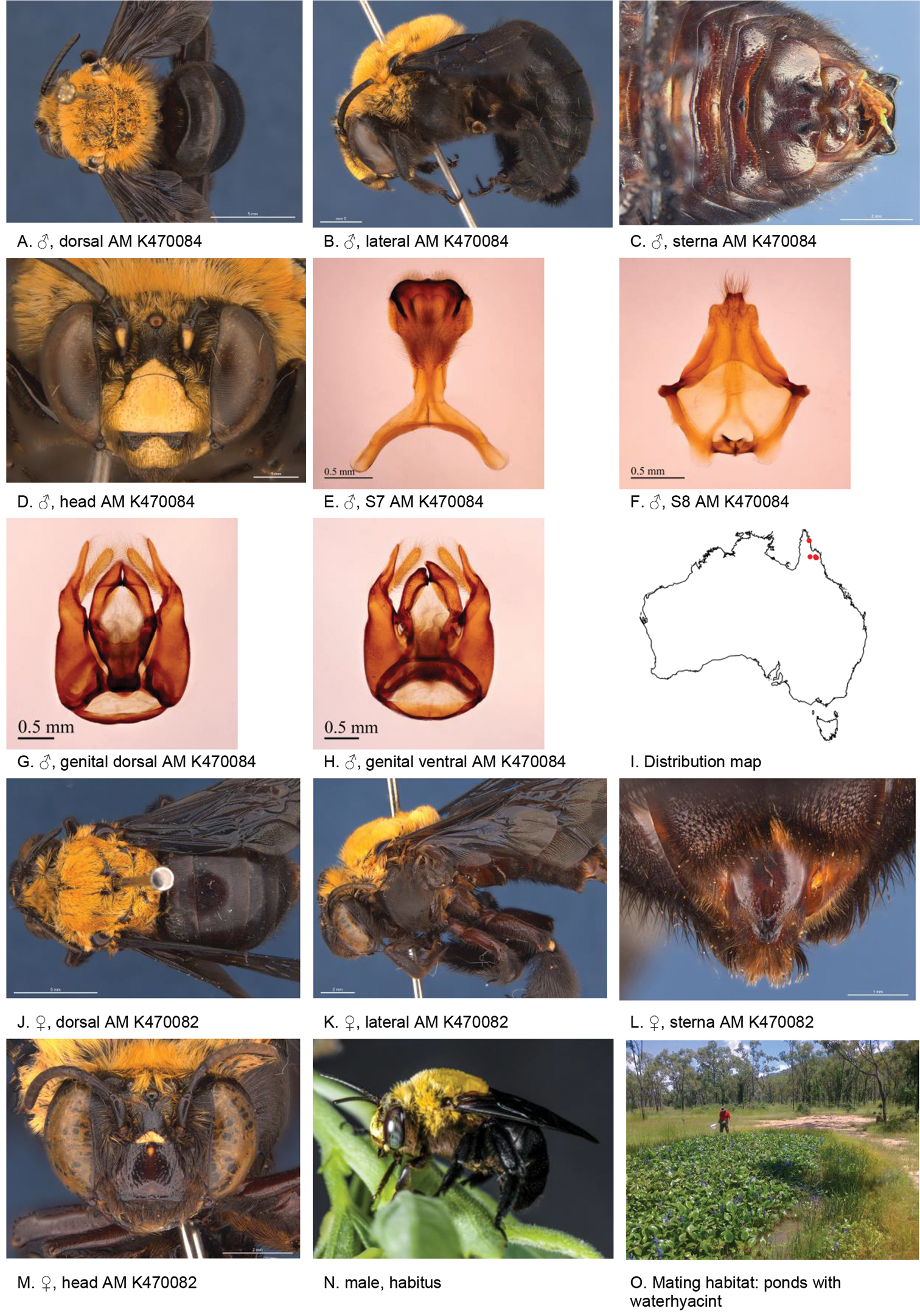

Scientific classification
- Kingdom: Animalia
- Phylum: Arthropoda
- Clade: Pancrustacea
- Class: Insecta
- Order: Hymenoptera
- Family: Apidae
- Genus: Amegilla
- Species: A. xylocopoides

Binomial name
- Amegilla xylocopoides Remko Leijs, 2020

= Amegilla xylocopoides =

Species of bee

Amegilla xylocopoides or Amegilla (Asaropoda) xylocopoides is a species of digger bee. It is endemic to Australia. It was described in 2020 by entomologist Remko Leijs.

== Etymology ==
The specific epithet xylocopoides refers to a superficial resemblance, in hair and wing colouration, to female carpenter bees Xylocopa (Koptortosoma) spp.

== Description ==
The body length is 16–19 mm, forewing length 13–16 mm, head width 6–7 mm.

== Distribution and habitat ==
The species occurs in Far North Queensland on the Cape York Peninsula. The male holotype was collected 19 km south-east of Laura and the female allotype at Iron Range.

== Behaviour ==
Male territorial behaviour has been observed taking place over water vegetated with native water hyacinth, Monochoria australasica.
