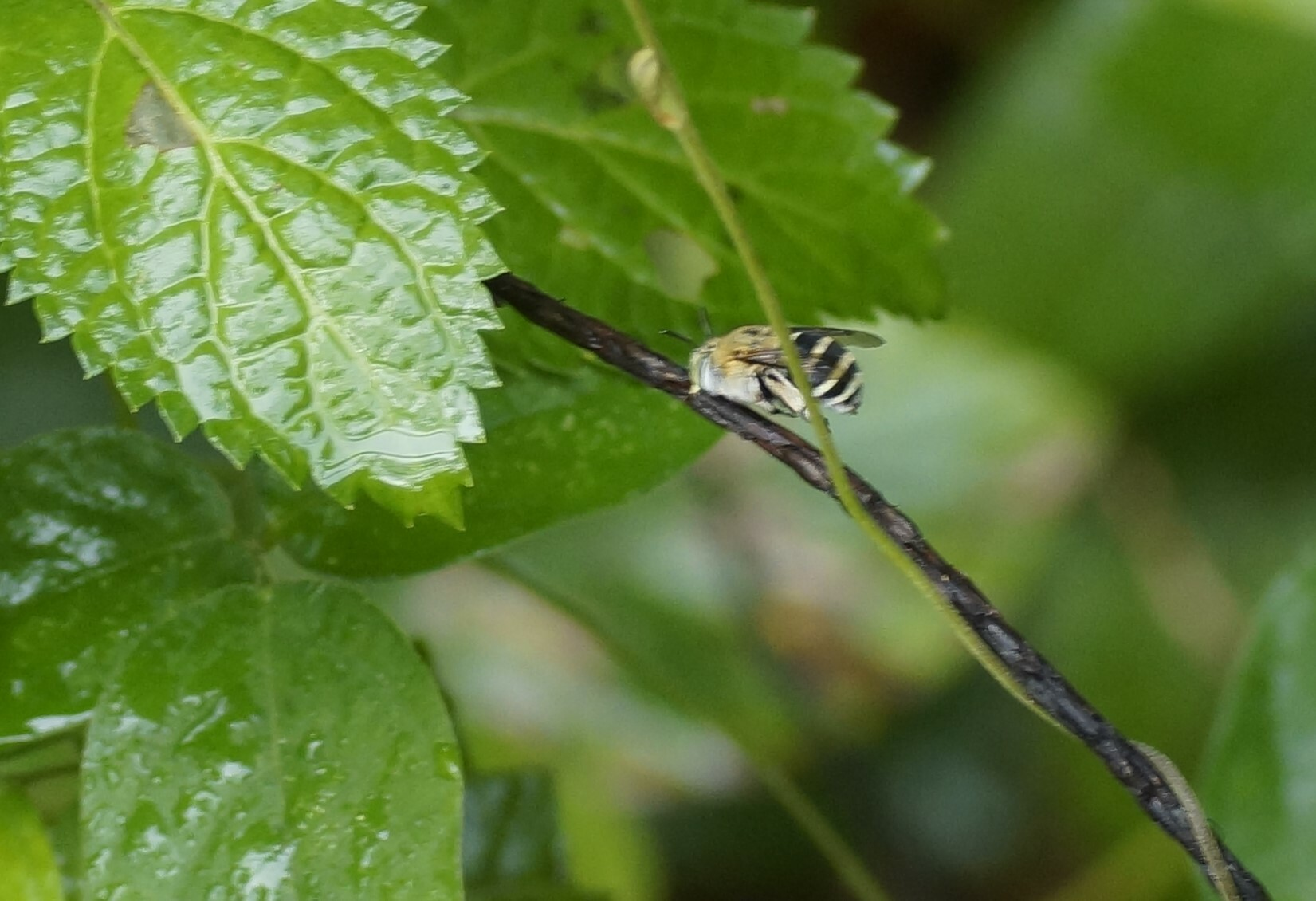

Scientific classification
- Kingdom: Animalia
- Phylum: Arthropoda
- Clade: Pancrustacea
- Class: Insecta
- Order: Hymenoptera
- Family: Apidae
- Genus: Amegilla
- Species: A. indistincta

Binomial name
- Amegilla indistincta Remko Leijs, Batley & Hogendoorn, 2017

= Amegilla indistincta =

Species of bee

Amegilla indistincta or Amegilla (Zonamegilla) indistincta is a species of digger bee. It is endemic to Australia. It was described in 2017 by entomologists Remko Leijs, Michael Batley and Katja Hogendoorn.

== Etymology ==
The specific epithet indistincta (Latin: “not distinguished”) refers to its not being previously distinguished among specimens of other species.

== Description ==
The body length of the species is 12–14 mm, forewing length 9 mm. The tergal fur bands usually have a yellowish tint.

== Distribution and habitat ==
The species occurs in the tropics and subtropics of eastern coastal Queensland. The holotype female was collected at Millstream Falls, the male allotype at Iron Range.
