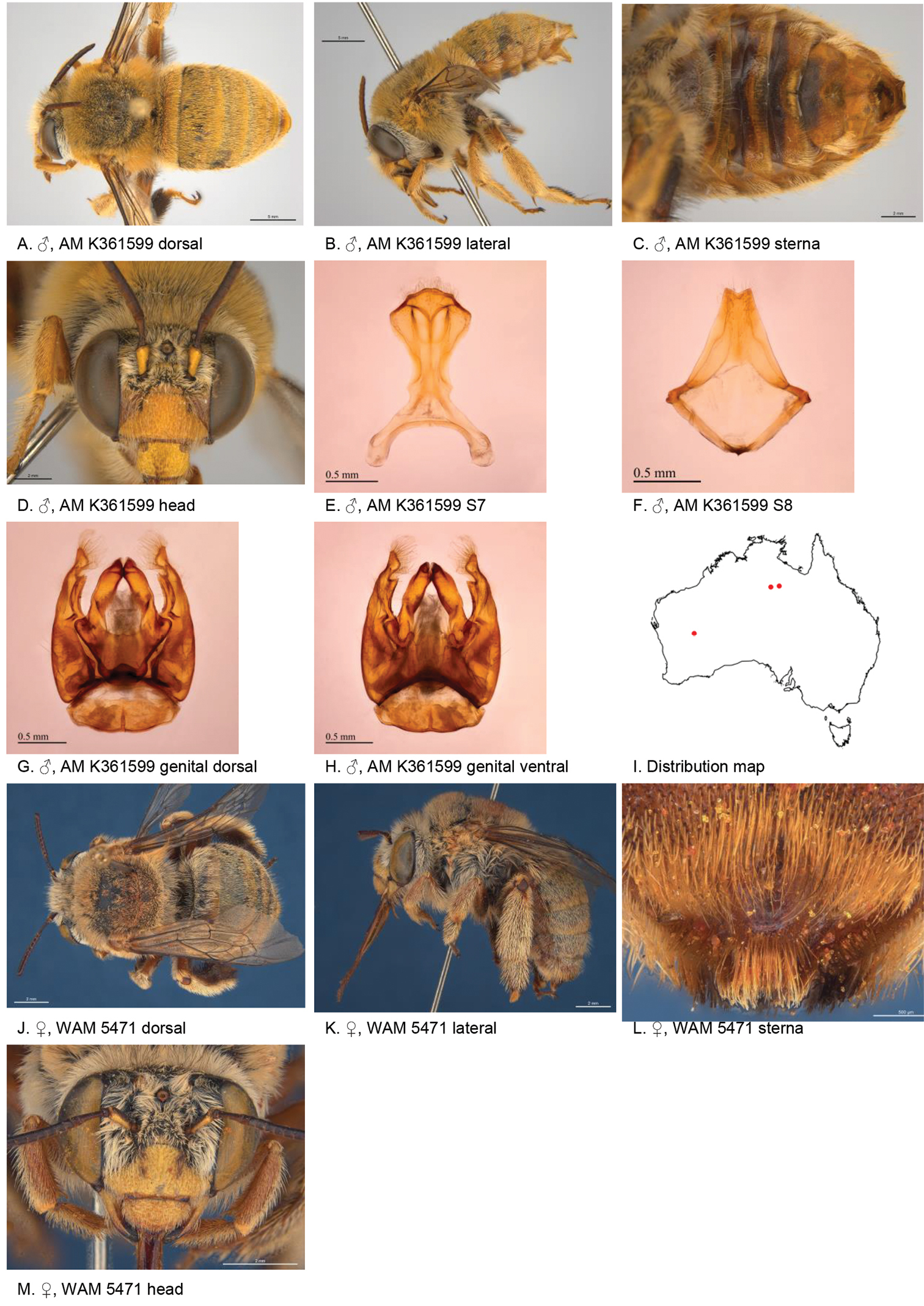

Scientific classification
- Kingdom: Animalia
- Phylum: Arthropoda
- Clade: Pancrustacea
- Class: Insecta
- Order: Hymenoptera
- Family: Apidae
- Genus: Amegilla
- Species: A. batleyi

Binomial name
- Amegilla batleyi Remko Leijs, 2020

= Amegilla batleyi =

Species of bee

Amegilla batleyi or Amegilla (Asaropoda) batleyi is a species of digger bee. It is endemic to Australia. It was described in 2020 by entomologist Remko Leijs.

== Etymology ==
The specific epithet batleyi honours Michael Batley for his contributions to Australian bee taxonomy.

== Description ==
The body length is 14 mm, forewing length 9–10 mm, head width 5–6 mm.

== Distribution and habitat ==
The species occurs in Western Australia and the Northern Territory. The male holotype was collected 7 km north-west of the Barkly Roadhouse, the female allotype 29 km south of Tennant Creek.

== Behaviour ==
Flowering plants visited by the bees include Eucalyptus species.
