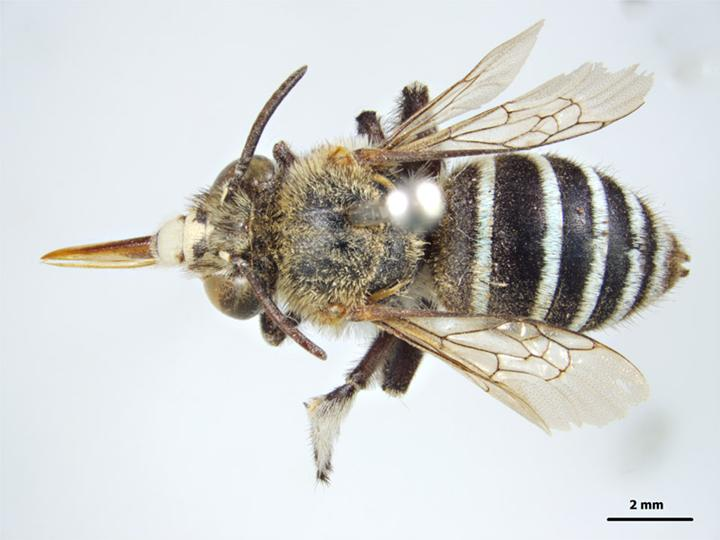
- Male

Scientific classification
- Kingdom: Animalia
- Phylum: Arthropoda
- Clade: Pancrustacea
- Class: Insecta
- Order: Hymenoptera
- Family: Apidae
- Genus: Amegilla
- Species: A. pulchra

Binomial name
- Amegilla pulchra ( Smith, 1854)

Synonyms
- Anthophora pulchra Smith, 1854; Amegilla pulchra (Smith) Michener, 1965; Amegilla (Zonamegilla) pulchra (Smith) Brooks, 1988; Anthophora holmesi Rayment, 1947; Amegilla holmesi (Rayment) Michener, 1965; Amegilla (Zonamegilla) holmesi (Rayment) Brooks, 1988; Anthophora parapulchra Rayment, 1947; Amegilla parapulchra (Rayment) Michener, 1965; Amegilla (Zonamegilla) parapulchra (Rayment) Brooks, 1988; Anthophora salteri Cockerell, 1905; Amegilla salteri (Cockerell) Michener, 1965; Amegilla (Zonamegilla) salteri (Cockerell) Brooks, 1988; Anthophora pulchra townleyella Rayment, 1947; Amegilla townleyella (Rayment) Michener, 1965; Anthophora shafferyella Rayment, 1947; Amegilla shafferyella (Rayment) Michener, 1965; Amegilla (Zonamegilla) shafferyella (Rayment) Brooks, 1988; Anthophora perpulchra wallaciella Rayment, 1947; Amegilla wallaciella (Rayment) Michener, 1965

= Amegilla pulchra =

Species of bee

Amegilla pulchra or Amegilla (Zonamegilla) pulchra is a species of digger bee. It is native to Australia. It was described in 1854 by English entomologist Frederick Smith, and redescribed by Remko Leys, Michael Batley and Katja Hogendoorn in 2017.

== Description ==
The body length of the species is 12–14 mm, forewing length 8–9 mm. It has ivory face marks and bands of pale blue or white fur on the tergites.

== Distribution and habitat ==
The species occurs in New South Wales, Queensland, South Australia and Victoria, mainly east of the Great Dividing Range, and is thought to have been introduced to Fiji.

== Behaviour ==
The adults are flying mellivores with sedentary larvae. They nest gregariously in soil burrows, in mortar between bricks, and in mud-bricks. Females are attracted to old nests. Flowering plants visited by the bees include Hypochaeris, Ipomoea, Leptospermum and Solanum species.
