= Amegilla comberi =

Scientific classification
- Kingdom: Animalia
- Phylum: Arthropoda
- Class: Insecta
- Order: Hymenoptera
- Family: Apidae
- Genus: Amegilla
- Subgenus: Zebramegilla
- Species: A. comberi

Binomial name
- Amegilla comberi (Cockerell, 1911)

Synonyms
- Anthophora comberi Cockerell, 1911

Species of blue-banded bee

Amegilla comberi, is a species of bee belonging to the family Apidae subfamily Apinae.
