= Amegilla puttalama =

Scientific classification
- Kingdom: Animalia
- Phylum: Arthropoda
- Class: Insecta
- Order: Hymenoptera
- Family: Apidae
- Genus: Amegilla
- Subgenus: Zebramegilla
- Species: A. puttalama

Binomial name
- Amegilla puttalama (Strand, 1913)

Synonyms
- Anthophora zonata puttalama Strand, 1913

Species of blue-banded bee

Amegilla puttalama, is a species of bee belonging to the family Apidae subfamily Apinae.
