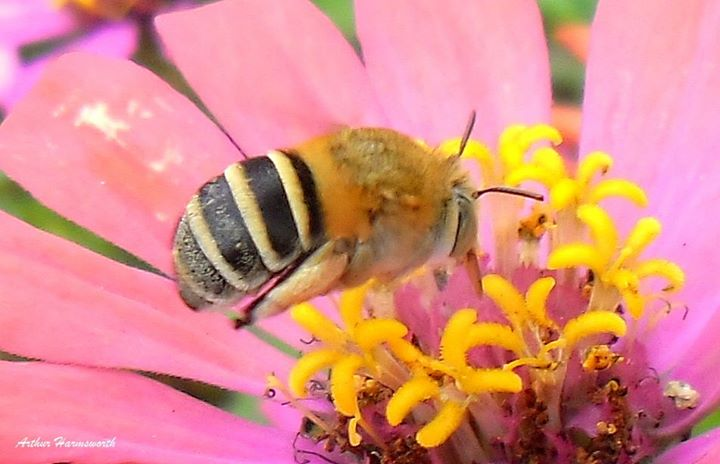

Scientific classification
- Kingdom: Animalia
- Phylum: Arthropoda
- Class: Insecta
- Order: Hymenoptera
- Family: Apidae
- Genus: Amegilla
- Species: A. calens

Binomial name
- Amegilla calens (Le Peletier, 1841)

= Amegilla calens =

Species of bee

Amegilla calens is a species of bees in the genus Amegilla. They were first described by Lepeletier in 1841. They are found in several countries in Africa, mainly in the south but as far north as Nigeria.

This are solitary species and they construct their nests in dry, clay rich grounds.
