= Amegilla fallax =

Scientific classification
- Kingdom: Animalia
- Phylum: Arthropoda
- Class: Insecta
- Order: Hymenoptera
- Family: Apidae
- Genus: Amegilla
- Subgenus: Zebramegilla
- Species: A. fallax

Binomial name
- Amegilla fallax (Smith, 1879)

Synonyms
- Anthophora fallax Smith, 1879; Anthophora diloloensis Cockerell, 1932; Anthophora ogilviei Cockerell, 1932; Anthophora nubana Cockerell, 1949

Species of blue-banded bee

Amegilla fallax is a species of bee belonging to the family Apidae subfamily Apinae.
