= Amegilla subcoerulea =

Scientific classification
- Kingdom: Animalia
- Phylum: Arthropoda
- Class: Insecta
- Order: Hymenoptera
- Family: Apidae
- Genus: Amegilla
- Subgenus: Zebramegilla
- Species: A. subcoerulea

Binomial name
- Amegilla subcoerulea (Lepeletier, 1841)

Synonyms
- Anthophora subcoerulea Lepeletier, 1841; Anthophora zonata var cingulata subvar subcaerulea Dours, 1870 emend; Anthophora lucknoviensis Radoszkowski, 1882; Anthophora rothneyi Cameron, 1897; Anthophora amolita Cockerell, 1911

Species of blue-banded bee

Amegilla subcoerulea is a species of bee belonging to the family Apidae subfamily Apinae.
