= Amegilla mucorea =

Scientific classification
- Kingdom: Animalia
- Phylum: Arthropoda
- Class: Insecta
- Order: Hymenoptera
- Family: Apidae
- Genus: Amegilla
- Subgenus: Micramegilla
- Species: A. mucorea

Binomial name
- Amegilla mucorea (Klug, 1845)

Species of blue-banded bee

Amegilla mucorea, is a species of bee belonging to the family Apidae subfamily Apinae.
