= Amegilla subinsularis =

Scientific classification
- Kingdom: Animalia
- Phylum: Arthropoda
- Class: Insecta
- Order: Hymenoptera
- Family: Apidae
- Genus: Amegilla
- Subgenus: Glossamegilla
- Species: A. subinsularis

Binomial name
- Amegilla subinsularis (Strand, 1910)

Species of blue-banded bee

Amegilla subinsularis, is a species of bee belonging to the family Apidae subfamily Apinae.
