= Amegilla violacea =

Scientific classification
- Kingdom: Animalia
- Phylum: Arthropoda
- Class: Insecta
- Order: Hymenoptera
- Family: Apidae
- Genus: Amegilla
- Subgenus: Glossamegilla
- Species: A. violacea

Binomial name
- Amegilla violacea (Lepeletier, 1841)

Synonyms
- Megilla albopunctata Illiger, 1806, nomen nudum; Anthophora violacea Lepeletier 1841; Anthophora indica Radoszkowski 1882; Anthophora cyanipennis Saussure, 1890, unconfirmed probable synonym; Anthophora violacea anthracina Gribodo, 1893; Amegilla (Aframegilla) cyanipennis (Saussure, 1890)

Species of blue-banded bee

Amegilla violacea is a species of bee belonging to the family Apidae subfamily Apinae.
