= Amegilla niveocincta =

Scientific classification
- Kingdom: Animalia
- Phylum: Arthropoda
- Class: Insecta
- Order: Hymenoptera
- Family: Apidae
- Genus: Amegilla
- Subgenus: Zebramegilla
- Species: A. niveocincta

Binomial name
- Amegilla niveocincta (Smith, 1854)

Species of blue-banded bee

Amegilla niveocincta, is a species of bee belonging to the family Apidae subfamily Apinae.
