= Amegilla confusa =

Scientific classification
- Kingdom: Animalia
- Phylum: Arthropoda
- Clade: Pancrustacea
- Class: Insecta
- Order: Hymenoptera
- Family: Apidae
- Genus: Amegilla
- Species: A. confusa

Binomial name
- Amegilla confusa (Smith, 1854)

Synonyms
- Anthophora confusa Smith, 1854

Species of blue-banded bee

Amegilla confusa, is a species of bee belonging to the family Apidae subfamily Apinae.
