= Amegilla cingulifera =

Scientific classification
- Kingdom: Animalia
- Phylum: Arthropoda
- Class: Insecta
- Order: Hymenoptera
- Family: Apidae
- Genus: Amegilla
- Subgenus: Zebramegilla
- Species: A. cingulifera

Binomial name
- Amegilla cingulifera (Cockerell, 1910)

Synonyms
- Anthophora cingulifera Cockerell, 1910

Species of blue-banded bee

Amegilla cingulifera, is a species of bee belonging to the family Apidae subfamily Apinae.
