= Calothamnus formosus =

Scientific classification
- Kingdom: Plantae
- Clade: Tracheophytes
- Clade: Angiosperms
- Clade: Eudicots
- Clade: Rosids
- Order: Myrtales
- Family: Myrtaceae
- Genus: Calothamnus
- Species: C. formosus

Binomial name
- Calothamnus formosus Hawkeswood

Synonyms
- Calothamnus formosus Hawkeswood subsp. formosus; Calothamnus formosus subsp. rigidus Hawkeswood; Melaleuca aglaia Craven & R.D.Edwards

Species of flowering plant

Calothamnus formosus is a plant in the myrtle family, Myrtaceae and is endemic to the south-west of Western Australia. It is a large, spreading, densely foliaged shrub with almost cylindrical, pointed leaves and red flowers in spring or summer. There are two subspecies, differing mainly in the length of their leaves. (In 2014 Craven, Edwards and Cowley proposed that the species be renamed Melaleuca aglaia.)

== Description ==
Calothamnus formosus is a large, spreading, densely branched shrub growing to a height of about 2.5 metres (8 ft), sometimes higher, with thick bark on the older stems. Its leaves are crowded on the ends of the younger branches, 40–90 millimetres (2–4 in) long, 0.8–1.2 millimetres (0.03–0.05 in) wide, linear, almost circular in cross section and tapering to a sharp but not prickly point.

The flowers are crimson and arranged in short clusters of 3 to 5, usually on the older, leafless stems. The petals are thin and papery, 3.5–6 millimetres (0.1–0.2 in) long. The stamens are arranged in claw-like bundles with 26 to 32 stamens per bundle. The claws are yellow-green near the base but otherwise crimson. Flowering occurs from August to December and is followed by fruits which are woody, roughly cylindrical capsules, 6.6–8 millimetres (0.26–0.31 in) long, 5–6 millimetres (0.20–0.24 in) in diameter and have a warty surface.

== Taxonomy and naming ==
Calothamnus formosus was first formally described in 1984 in Nuytsia by Trevor Hawkeswood from a specimen found on a roadside about 65 kilometres (40 mi) south east of Denham. The specific epithet (formosus) is a Latin word meaning “beautifully formed” or "handsome".

There are two subspecies:

- Calothamnus formosus subsp. formosus, which has leaves that are mostly less than 70 millimetres (3 in) long and occurs in the Shark Bay area
- Calothamnus formosus subsp. rigidus, which has leaves that are mostly more than 70 millimetres (3 in) long and occurs between the Overlander Roadhouse and Yuna district

== Distribution and habitat ==
Calothamnus formosus is found in and between the Shark Bay and Yuna districts in the Carnarvon, Geraldton Sandplains and Yalgoo biogeographic regions. It grows in sand on sandplains.

== Conservation ==
Calothamnus formosus is classified as "not threatened" by the Western Australian government department of parks and wildlife.
