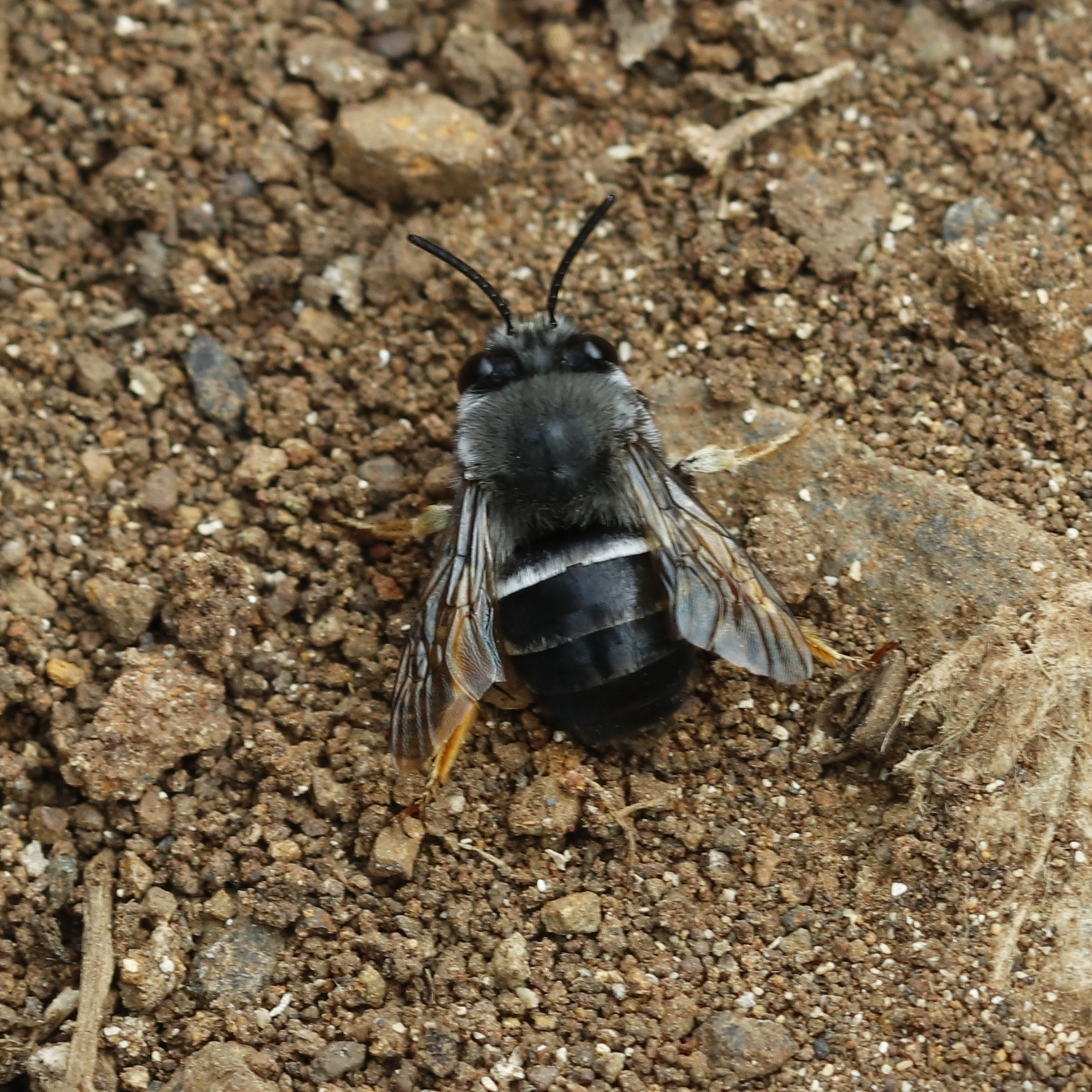
- female

Scientific classification
- Kingdom: Animalia
- Phylum: Arthropoda
- Clade: Pancrustacea
- Class: Insecta
- Order: Hymenoptera
- Family: Apidae
- Genus: Amegilla
- Species: A. godofredi

Binomial name
- Amegilla godofredi (Dours, 1869)

Synonyms
- Anthophora godofredi Sichel, 1869; Anthophora modesta F. Smith, 1879; Podalirius godefredii (Dours, 1869)

= Amegilla godofredi =

Species of bee

Amegilla godofredi is a species of solitary digger bees in the subgenus Micramegilla, endemic to Cape Verde.

== Distribution ==
Amegilla godofredi is reported from three islands in Cape Verde: São Vicente, Santo Antão and São Nicolau. It inhabits open woodlands, pastures and roadsides up to 1,500 m (4,900 ft) in altitude.

== Description ==
It is essentially all black with a characteristic pale band of hair on the apical end of the first tergite and bright orange-haired legs. It is generally somewhat larger and the strip of pale hair is noticeably broader than in the similar Amegilla modestoides that occurs on Santiago. Amegilla capeverdensis is found on Sal and Boa Vista and is smaller and much brighter than A. godofredi.

== Biology ==
Amegilla godofredi is a species of solitary bees. It is polylectic and can be encountered from November to April, feeding and collecting pollen and nectar on plants with elongated floral tubes, among them Aeonium gorgoneum (Crassulaceae), Echium stenosiphon (Boraginaceae), Campylanthus glaber (Plantaginaceae) and Lotus sp. (Fabaceae).
