= Baudin Island (Kimberley coast) =

Island in Western Australia

Baudin Island (14°7′44″S 125°36′12″E) is located off the Kimberley coast of Western Australia.
