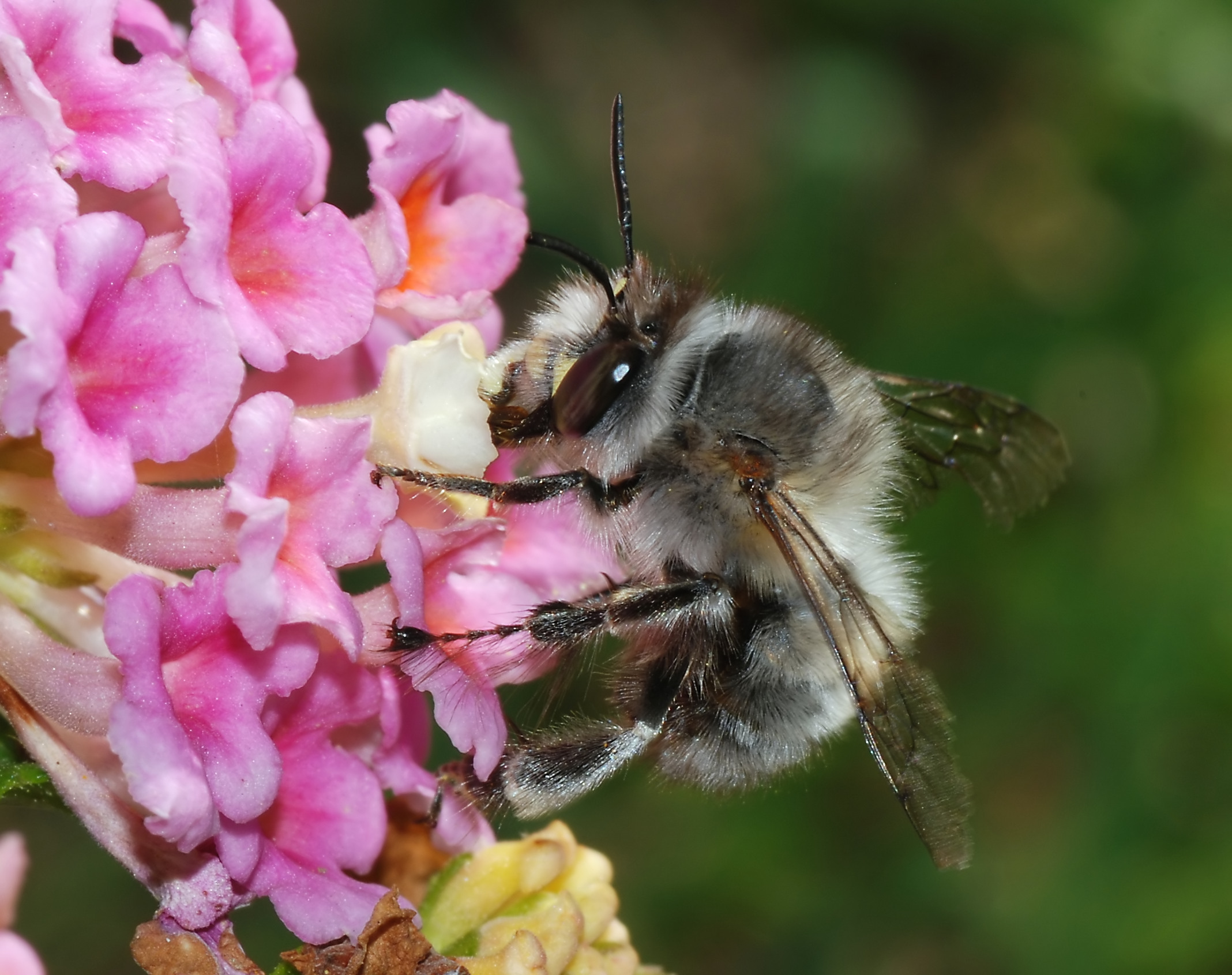
- Male Anthophora plumipes

Scientific classification
- Kingdom: Animalia
- Phylum: Arthropoda
- Clade: Pancrustacea
- Class: Insecta
- Order: Hymenoptera
- Family: Apidae
- Subfamily: Apinae
- Tribe: Anthophorini

Genera
- Amegilla; Anthophora; Deltoptila; Elaphropoda; Habrophorula; Habropoda; Pachymelus

= Anthophorini =

Anthophorini Temporal range: Late Oligocene – Holocene

Tribe of bees

The Anthophorini are a large tribe in the subfamily Apinae of the family Apidae. Species in this tribe are often referred to as digger bees, although this common name is sometimes also applied to members of the tribe Centridini. It contains over 750 species worldwide, all of which were previously classified in the obsolete family Anthophoridae along with members of several other tribes; the vast majority of species in the tribe Anthophorini are in the genera Amegilla and Anthophora.

== Description ==
All Anthophorini species are solitary, though many nest in large aggregations. Nearly all species make nests in the soil, either in banks or in flat ground; the larvae develop in cells with waterproof linings and do not spin cocoons.

The characters used to define this group are subtle, but they are nonetheless fairly recognizable.

- They are generally large (up to 3 cm), very robust, hairy bees, with visibly protruding faces, and the apical portion of the wings are studded with microscopic papillae.
- The abdomen is often banded, and in many Old World species of Amegilla, these bands are metallic blue.
- The wings often appear disproportionately short compared to other bees.
- Their "buzz" is often a high-pitched whine, as they hover and feed on flowers.
- Males commonly have pale white or yellow facial markings, and/or peculiarly modified leg armature and hairs.

=== Genera ===
- Amegilla
- Anthophora
- Deltoptila
- Elaphropoda
- Habrophorula
- Habropoda
- Pachymelus
- †Protohabropoda
