= Australian native bees =

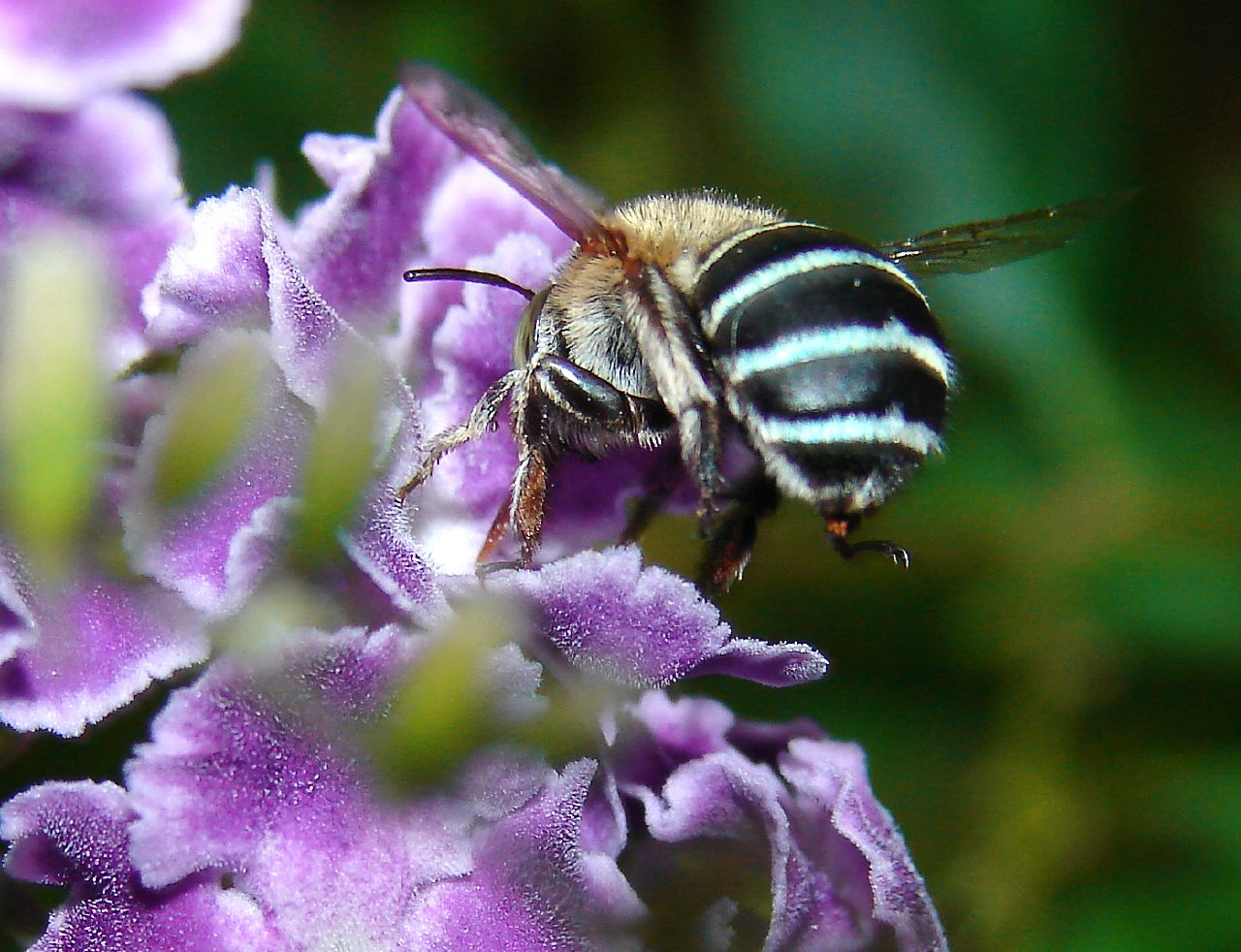
Australian Blue Banded Bee Amegilla spp.

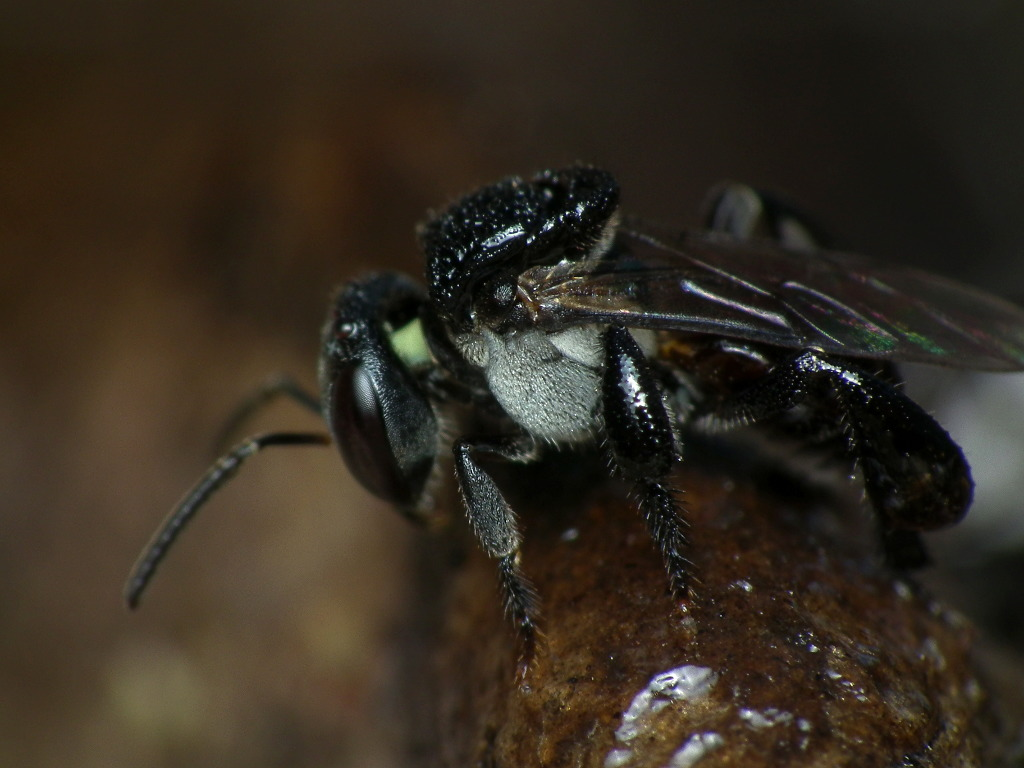
Australian Sugarbag Bee Tetragonula carbonaria

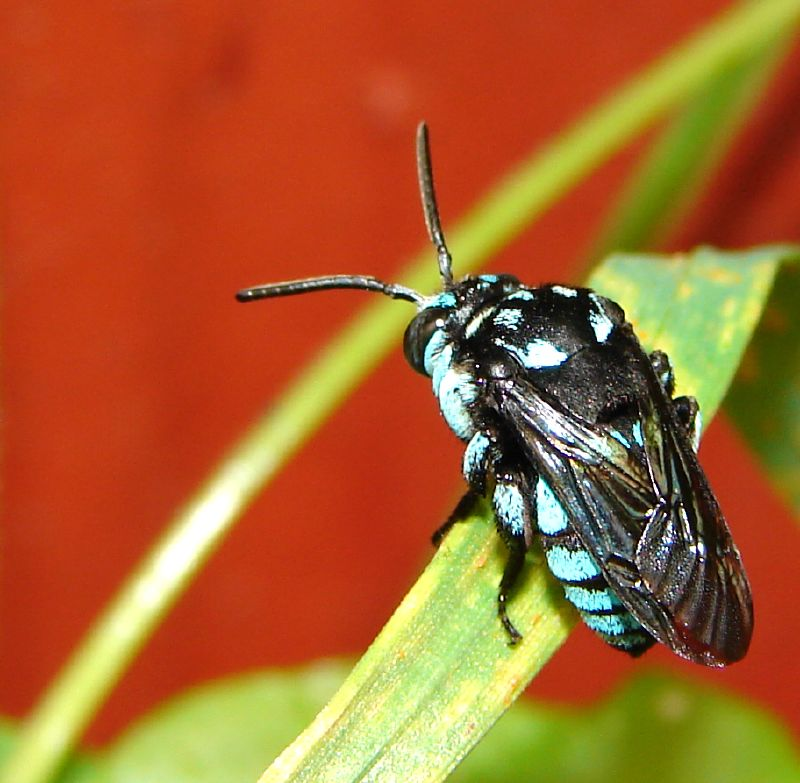
Cloak and dagger cuckoo bee Thyreus spp.

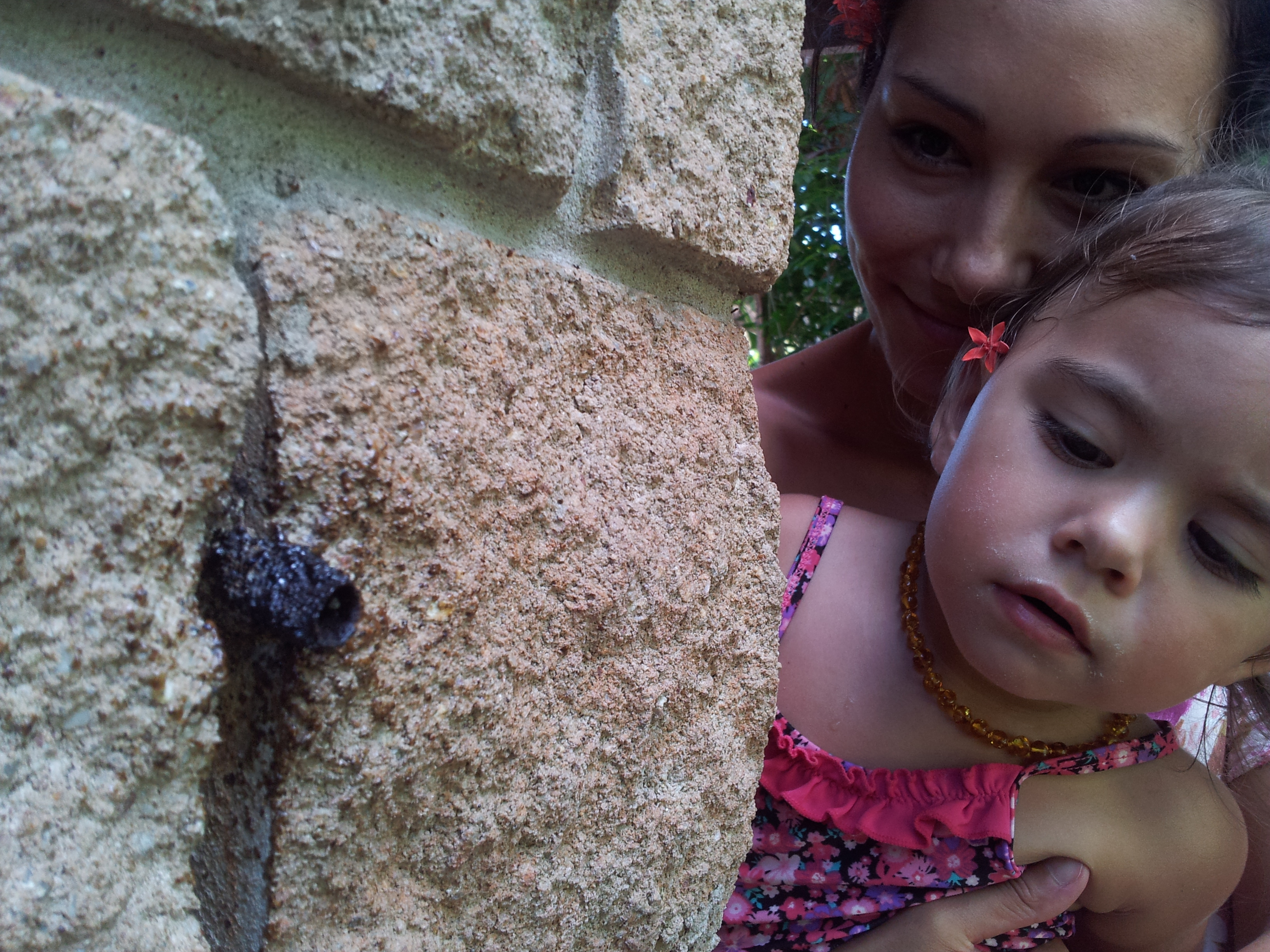
The entry and exit spout of a native bee hive forming in the brickwork of a house in Darwin, Australia

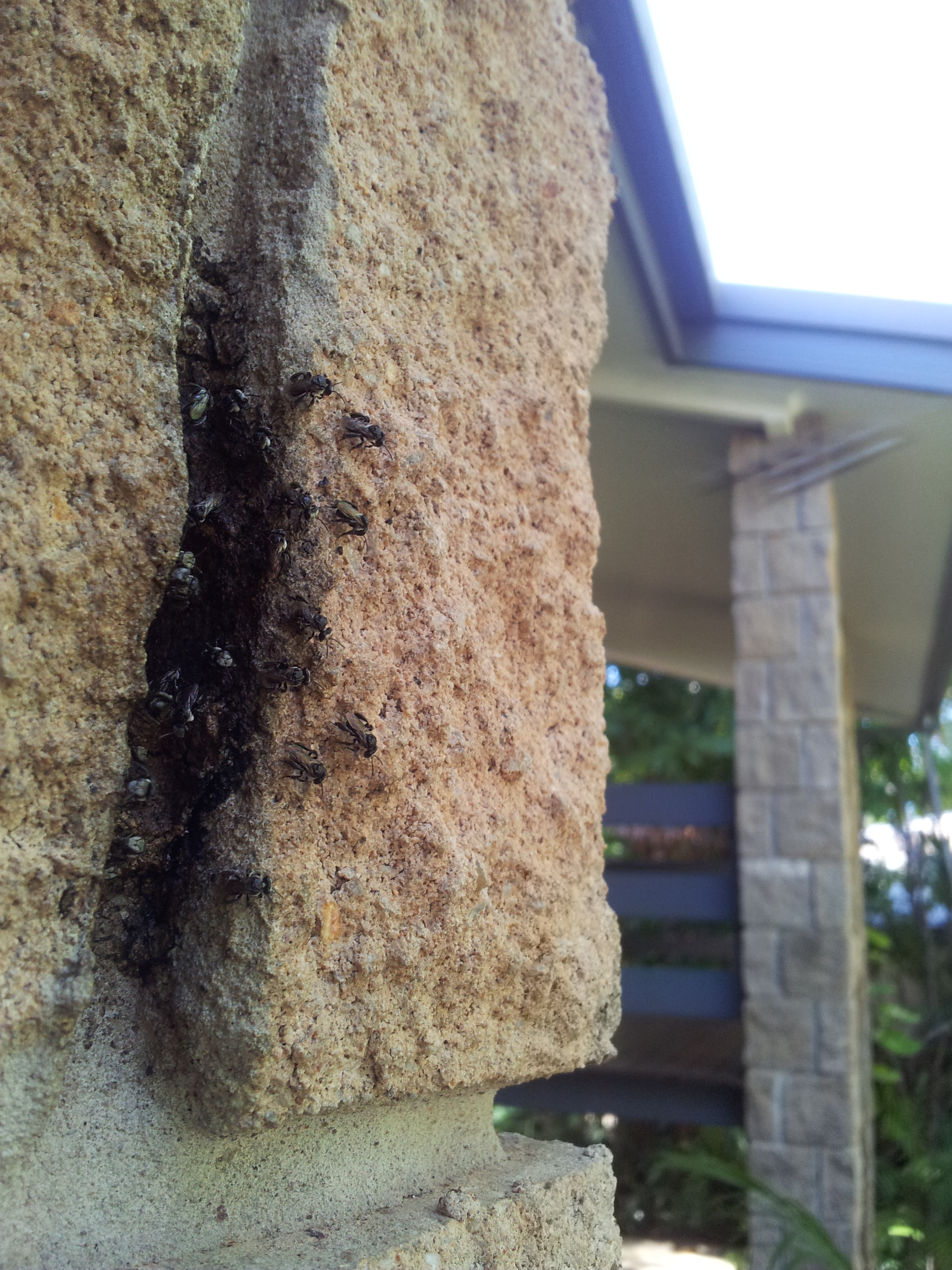
Native bees forming a hive in the brickwork of a house in Darwin, Australia

Australian native bees are a group of bees that play a crucial role in the pollination of native plants. There are over 1,700 species of native bees in Australia, ranging from small solitary bees to the social stingless bees. Native bees are important for native ecosystems, providing pollination services to native plants, and hold value for Australian agriculture.

== Defense ==
Eleven species, of these social native bees, are in two genera, Tetragonula and Austroplebeia, and have no sting.

The stings of most Australian native species of bee will cause relatively minor discomfort to most people and are, "not as painful as those of a bull ant or paper wasp and last only a few minutes". However, they do not have barbed stings and may sting more than once, and can cause an allergic reaction—increasing effect associated with repeated exposure to the antigen.

== Honey ==
The native species of bee in Australia are not true honey bees, which are native to Europe, Asia and Africa. The vast majority of native Australian bees are solitary, and so do not produce honey, however Australian sugarbag bees are eusocial and produce honey in a similar manner to the European honey bee. As a relatively primitive social species of native bees, they do not produce honey in great quantities relative to true honey bees. Sugarbag bees store their honey in "small resinous pots which look like bunches of grapes", giving them their common name of "sugarbag bees". Storage in these pots allows the honey to naturally ferment, making the honey a tangy in comparison with commercial honey taken from the European honey bee. The honey also has a higher relative water content, meaning it does not keep as well as traditional honey, and must be stored carefully to avoid further fermentation.

As sugarbag bees do not produce honey in combs like true honeybees, to collect honey, beekeepers pierce the pots within the hive and pour the honey out of the hive into a container. Collecting honey from Australian native bee nests can cause many of the bees to drown in spilt honey, and can be destructive to the hive, so it can be difficult to collect large amounts of honey. In cool-climate areas of Australia, all the honey the bees produce is needed by the hive to live through winter. While many hobbyists keep stingless bees as pets and to collect honey in Australia, there is no wider Australian stingless bee honey industry currently.

== Pollination ==
The different species of Australian native bee gather pollen in different manners, allowing each species to fit into its own niche within the Australian ecosystem. Native bees range from generalist pollinator species that forage on many species, like Australian stingless bees, to more specialist pollinators including Amegilla ("blue-banded bees"), which can be buzz pollination specialists. Australian native bees are effective pollinators of Australian native flora, and are key to the success and proliferation of plant life across the country. For some native flora, and even some crop species, native bees are considered to be more effective/prolific pollinators than introduced species such as the European honeybee.

Most agricultural/commercial pollination in Australia relies on the introduced European honeybee, however there is currently a push for more research into the use of native bees for agricultural pollination to supplement this system following the introduction of the honeybee pest Varroa destructor to Australia. For example, some species of social stingless bees are used for pollination of crops including macadamias, avocadoes, and capsicums. As well as this, research is currently underway into use of blue-banded bees for use in pollinating hydroponic tomatoes due to their potential as native buzz-pollinators. However, some hydroponic growers are petitioning for introduction to the Australian mainland of the European bumblebee, Bombus terrestris. The island continent of Australia has a history of sensationally poor outcomes from introduced species so the question of use of native vs introduced bees for pollination in Australia is controversial.

== Western Australian native bees ==
Approximately 800 species of native bee occur in Western Australia, and many of them are endemic. Like all bees, native Australian bees are a type of specialized wasp (Apoidea) that has evolved to vegetarianism. They feed on nectar, but it is the female native Australian bee that will thicken the nectar to make honey before taking it back to the nest. Australian bees are mostly solitary insects. A female bee will build a nest with the aid of "workers". Native Australian bees face many threats, particularly from parasitic insects such as some wasps, flies and beetles.

== Selected Species ==
- Amegilla albiceps (Rayment, 1951)
- Amegilla chlorocyanea (Cockerell, 1914)
- Amegilla asserta (Cockerell, 1926)
- Amegilla bombiformis (Teddy bear bee, Golden haired mortar bee) (Smith, 1854)
- Amegilla cingulata (Blue-banded bee) (Fabricius, 1775)
- Amegilla dawsoni (Dawson's burrowing bee) (Rayment, 1951)
- Exoneura robusta (Cockerell, 1922)
- Hylaeus alcyoneus (Banksia bee) (Erichson, 1842)
- Hylaeus proximus (Lesser red masked bee) (Smith, 1879)
- Hyleoides concinna (Common wasp-mimic bee) (Fabricius, 1775)
- Lipotriches australica (Smith, 1875)
- Lipotriches flavoviridis (Cockerell, 1905)
- Megachile aurifrons (Red-eyed bee, Golden-browed resin bee) (Smith, 1853)
- Megachile erythropyga (Smith, 1853)
- Megachile nigrovittata (Cockerell, 1906)
- Thyreus caeruleopunctatus (Blanchard, 1840)
- Thyreus waroonensis (Cockerell, 1913)
- Xylocopa aerata (Golden-green carpenter bee, Green carpenter bee) (Smith, 1851)
- Xylocopa bombylans (Peacock carpenter bee) (Fabricius, 1775)

=== Stingless bees ===
- Austroplebeia australis (Friese, 1898)
- Austroplebeia cassiae (Cockerell, 1910)
- Austroplebeia cincta (Mocsáry, 1898)
- Austroplebeia essingtoni (Cockerell, 1905)
- Austroplebeia magna (Dollin, Dollin, & Rasmussen, 2015)
- Tetragonula carbonaria (Sugarbag bee) (Smith, 1854)
- Tetragonula hockingsi (Cockerell, 1929)
- Tetragonula mellipes (Friese, 1898)

== See also ==
- Elizabeth Exley, an Australian native bee entomologist
- Kit Prendergast, an Australian wild bee ecologist
