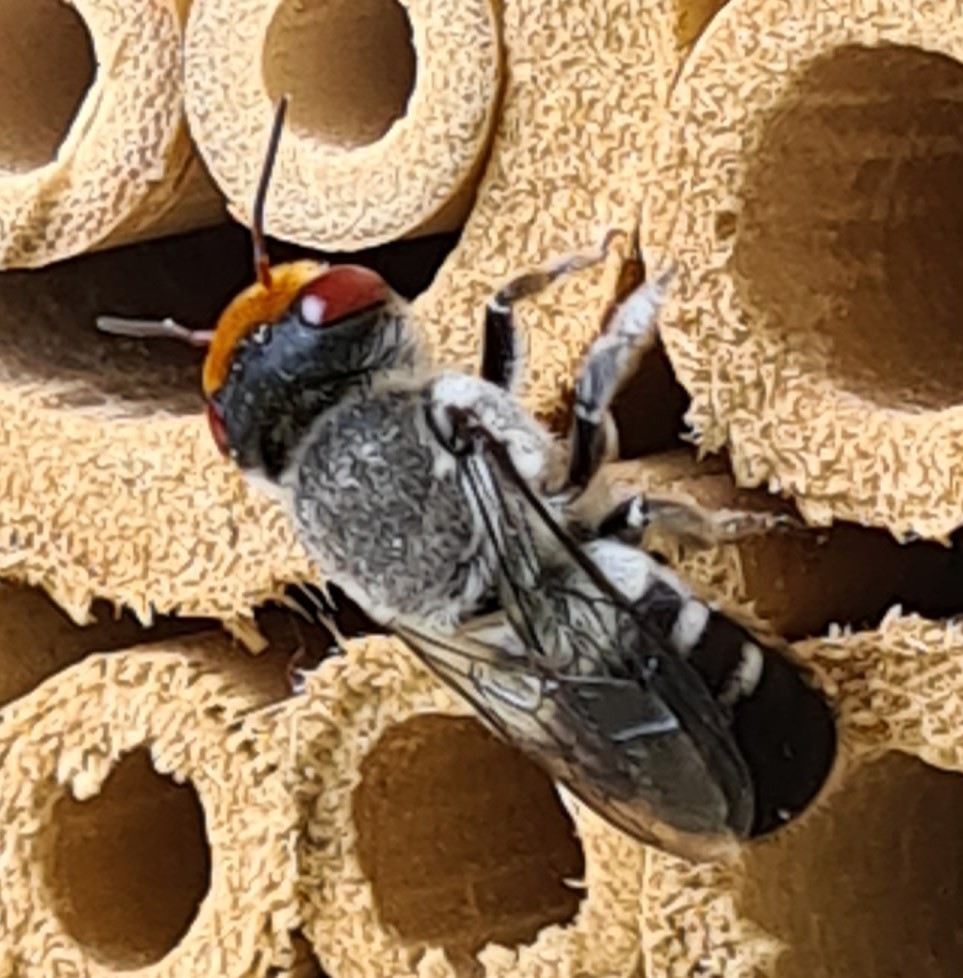

Scientific classification
- Kingdom: Animalia
- Phylum: Arthropoda
- Clade: Pancrustacea
- Class: Insecta
- Order: Hymenoptera
- Family: Megachilidae
- Genus: Megachile
- Species: M. aurifrons

Binomial name
- Megachile aurifrons Smith, 1853

= Megachile aurifrons =

Species of leafcutter bee (Megachile)

Megachile aurifrons, commonly known as the red-eyed resin bee or golden-browed resin bee, is a species of solitary bee in the family Megachilidae. It was first described in 1853 by Frederick Smith, and it can be found throughout mainland Australia. Females are approximately 12 millimetres in length, with bright red eyes and orange facial hair. Males are approximately 10 millimetres in length, with bicoloured eyes, mostly white facial hair and modified front legs. Nests are constructed in various natural and man-made cavities. This species has been recorded visiting flowers from a wide range of plant families.

== Taxonomy ==
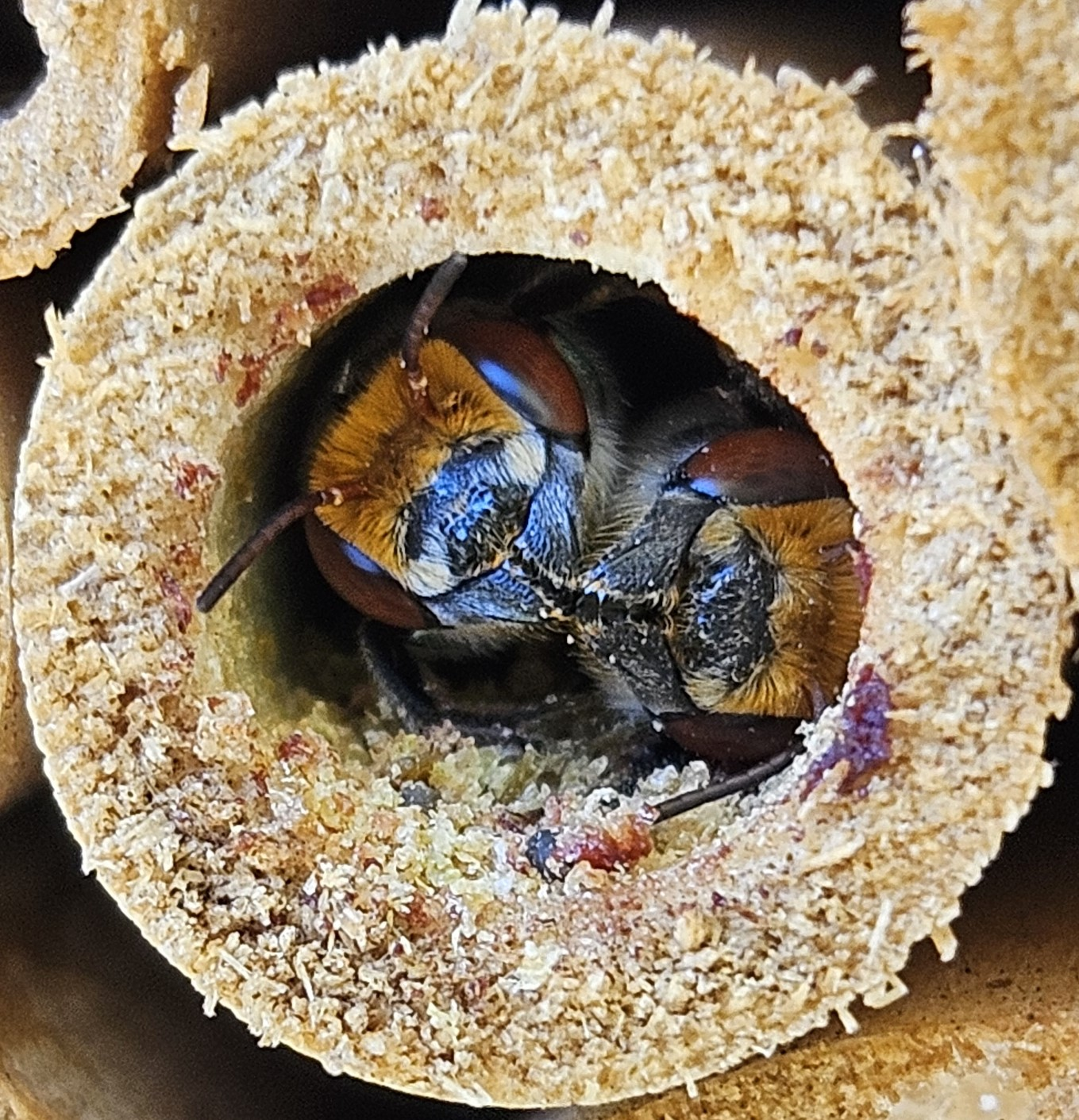
Two females

Megachile aurifrons was first described by British entomologist Frederick Smith in 1853. The specific name (aurifrons) means “golden brow” in Latin. The holotype was a female. The male was first described in 1910 by American entomologist Theodore D. A. Cockerell, who named it Megachile oculipes. That specimen was collected in Townsville, Queensland. After the two specific names were eventually synonymised, the species was placed in the genus Chalicodoma. Professor Charles Michener returned it to the Megachile genus in his magnum opus – The Bees of the World, which was published in 2000.

The common names of red-eyed bee and golden-browed resin bee refer to the eye colour and golden hair on the vertex of both sexes, as well as the resin that females use to seal their nests.

== Description ==
=== Females ===
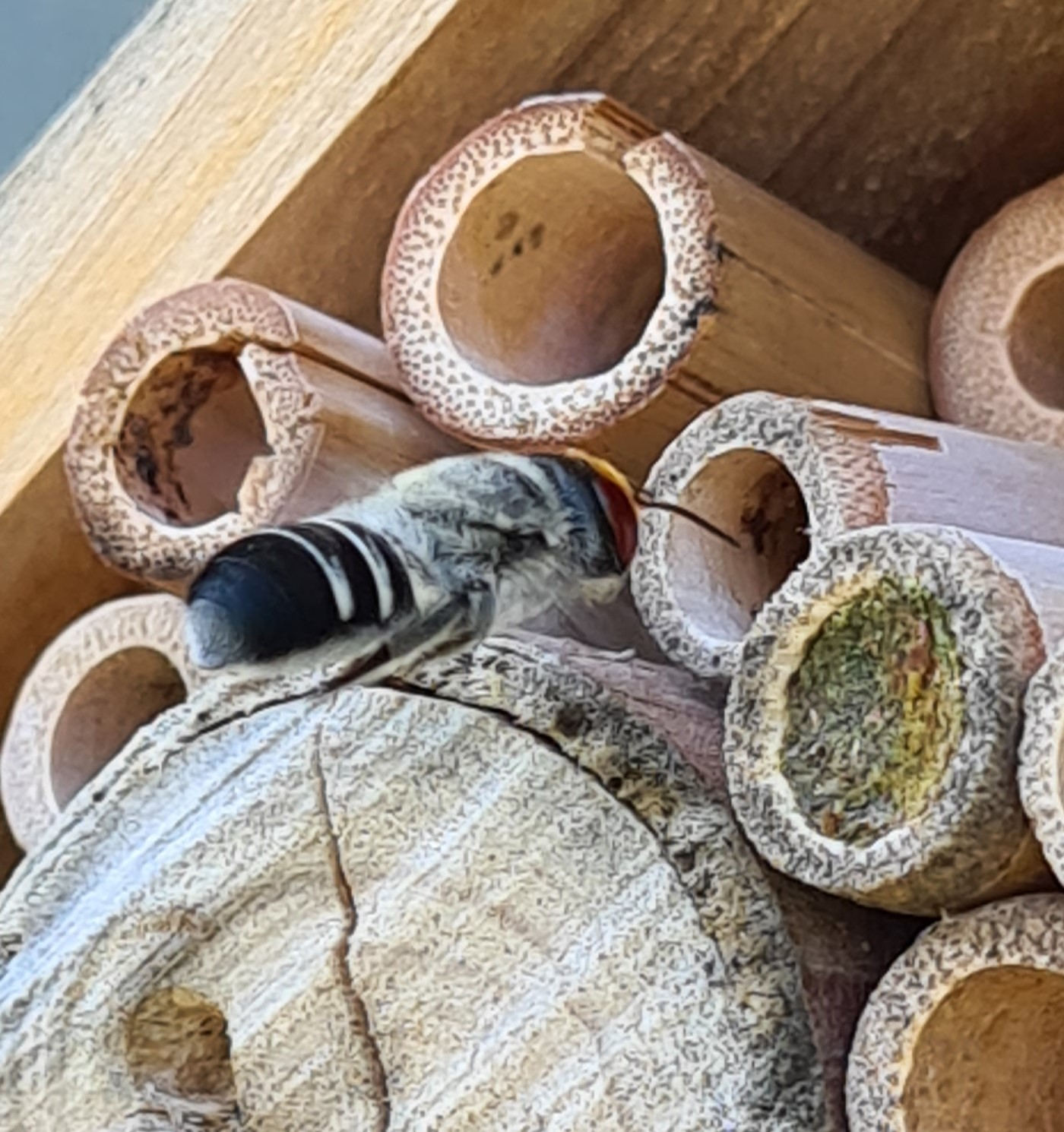
Female

Females are approximately 12 mm in length. The eyes are vivid red, but this colour quickly fades in dead specimens. The facial hair is bright orange, with a patch of white hair above the base of each mandible. The clypeus has a distinctive projection, like a pig’s snout. This is believed to aid the female in carrying and manipulating resin during nest construction. The antennae are red at the base, becoming darker towards the tips. There is white hair on the side of the head.

The wings are translucent near the base, becoming clouded towards the tips. The thorax has white hair on the sides. The abdomen has white hair bands on the first three segments and white hair on the final segment. The female has white scopal hairs underneath the abdomen for collecting pollen. These scopal hairs can appear to be different colours due to the colour of the pollen being collected.

The legs are covered with short white hair, with reddish brown hair beneath the tarsi. The claws are rust-coloured with black tips.

=== Males ===
Males are approximately 10 mm in length. The eyes are red in the upper part and a very light green in the lower part. The facial hair is white, with some orange hair near the ocelli. The antennae are long and slender, and red at the base. The antennae are black above and red beneath, except for the last three segments, which are entirely black. There is thick white hair on each side of the head below the eyes.

The wings are translucent with a dark streak in the marginal cell of the forewing, and the tegulae are brown. The thorax has white hair. The abdomen has white hair bands on the hind margins of the first three segments, and sparse white hair on the final segments.

The forelegs are red, and they (as in the males of many Megachile species) have expanded tarsi. This modification consists of a large oval lobe, which is white with a grey central spot (the spot is black on the inner side). The spot is believed to be a signal to the female during copulation. The middle legs are mostly red with a black band on each tibia. The hind legs are black.

== Distribution and habitat ==
Megachile aurifrons can be found throughout mainland Australia, including arid and urban areas.

== Behaviour and ecology ==
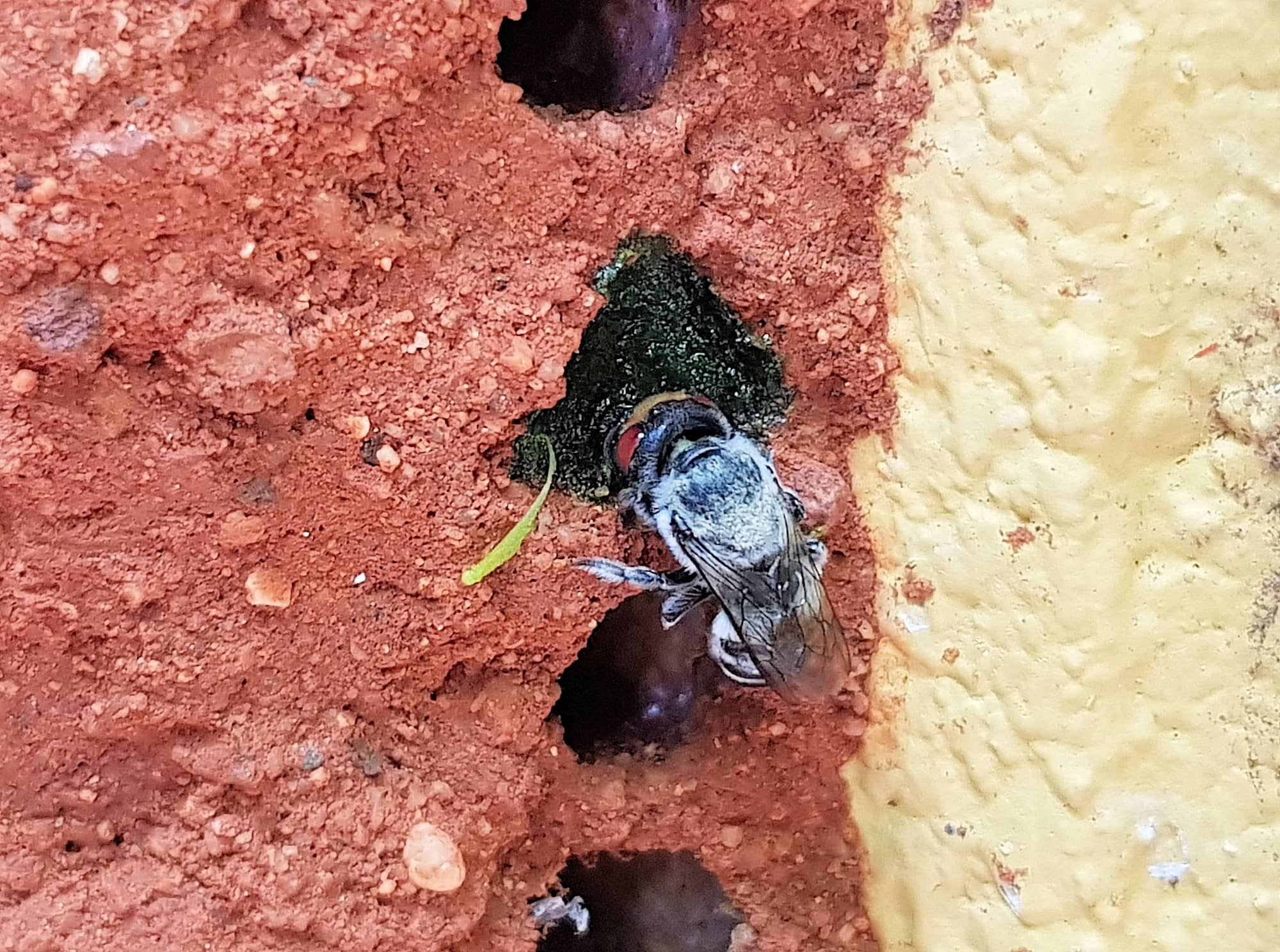
Female sealing her nest with resin. This nest was made in a cavity of an old mud wasp nest (Eumenes latreilli).

Megachile aurifrons nests in various natural cavities, including holes created by wood-boring beetles, large gum nuts, and the vacated nests of mud wasps from the genera Abispa, Delta, Eumenes and Sceliphron. It will also nest in man-made cavities, such as bee hotels, plastic piping, screw holes in outdoor furniture, and holes in fence posts, mortar or sandstone. Their preferred cavity diameter is 6 to 10 millimetres.

Unlike most other species in this genus, Megachile aurifrons do not build individual cells in their nests. Instead, they create a communal mass of pollen provision, and then deposit eggs in separate cavities within it. Females can be seen entering the nest head first, and then backing out and re-entering tail first to scrape the pollen into the nest. The nest is finally sealed using resin and masticated leaf tissue. It’s sometimes finished off with other materials, such as wood dust or fibres from old flowers.

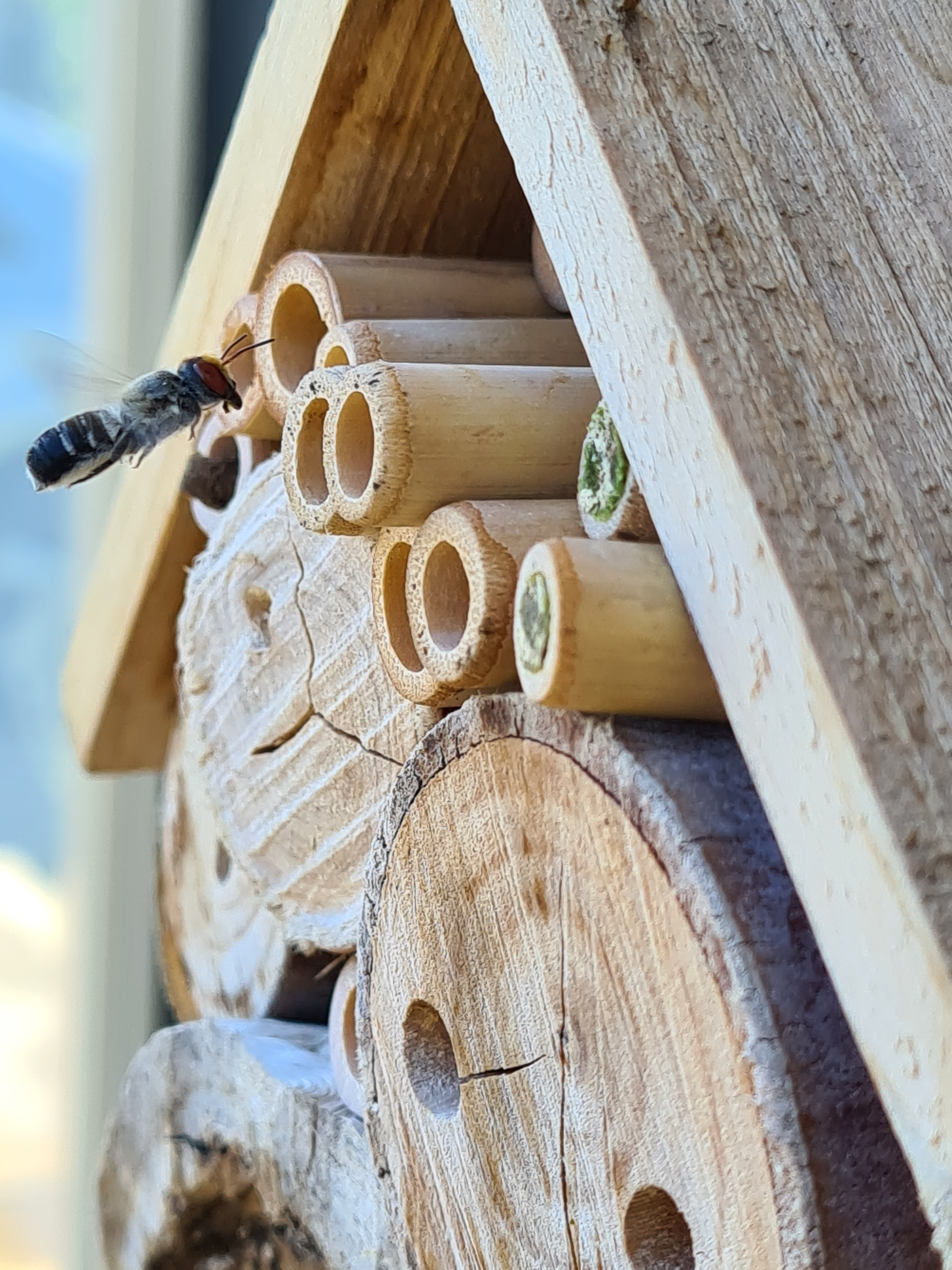
Female using a bee hotel for nesting.

As the larvae develop, they may start competing for the last scraps of food, which might explain the size variation noted among adults. When fully fed, the larvae spin brown, firm cocoons in a cluster, before developing into pupae and then adults. Under ideal conditions, it takes two to three months for the new generation to emerge after the nest is sealed. However warmer temperatures can shorten the development time, and cooler conditions can lengthen it. If the eggs are laid late in the season, the offspring will enter diapause until warmer conditions return.

This species has been recorded visiting flowers from a wide range of plant families, including Myrtacea, Fabaceae, Goodeniaceae, Loranthaceae, Papilionaceae, Polygalaceae and Proteacea. Adults can be seen all year in northern Australia, and from spring to late summer in cooler areas.

Males have been observed carrying nymphs of the parasitic mite Chaetodactylus. Females can sting if handled, but they are not aggressive.
