= Disassortative mating =

Mating with individuals with dissimilar phenotypes

Disassortative mating (also known as negative assortative mating or heterogamy) is a mating pattern in which individuals with dissimilar phenotypes mate with one another more frequently than would be expected under random mating. Disassortative mating reduces the mean genetic similarities within the population and produces a greater number of heterozygotes. The pattern is character specific, but does not affect allele frequencies. This nonrandom mating pattern will result in deviation from the Hardy-Weinberg principle (which states that genotype frequencies in a population will remain constant from generation to generation in the absence of other evolutionary influences, such as "mate choice" in this case).

Disassortative mating is different from outbreeding, which refers to mating patterns in relation to genotypes rather than phenotypes.

Due to homotypic preference (bias toward the same type), assortative mating occurs more frequently than disassortative mating. This is because homotypic preferences increase relatedness between mates and between parents and offspring that would promote cooperation and increase inclusive fitness. With disassortative mating, heterotypic preference (bias towards different types) in many cases has been shown to increase overall fitness. When this preference is favored, it allows a population to generate and/or maintain polymorphism (genetic variation within a population).

The fitness advantage aspect of disassortative mating seems straightforward, but the evolution of selective forces involved in disassortative mating are still largely unknown in natural populations.

== Types of disassortative mating ==
Imprinting is one example of disassortative mating. A model shows that individuals imprint on a genetically transmitted trait during early ontogeny and choosy females later use those parental images as a basis of mate choice. A viability-reducing trait may be maintained even without the fertility cost of same-type matings. With imprinting, preference can be established even if it is initially rare, when there is a fertility cost of same-type matings.

One uncommon type of disassortative mating is the female preference on rare (or novel) male phenotypes. A study on guppies, Poecilia reticulata, revealed that the female preference was sufficient to tightly maintain polymorphism in male traits. This type of mate choice shows that costly preferences can persist at higher frequencies if mate choice is hindered, which would allow the alleles to approach fixation.

== Effects ==
Disassortative mating may result in balancing selection and the maintenance of high genetic variation in the population. This is due to the excess heterozygotes that are produced from disassortative mating relative to a randomly mating population.

== In humans ==
The best-known example of disassortative mating in humans is preference for genes in the major histocompatibility complex (MHC) region on chromosome 6. Individuals feel more attracted to odors of individuals who are genetically different in this region. This promotes MHC heterozygosity in the children, making them less vulnerable to pathogens.

== In non-human species ==
Evidence from research regarding coloration in Heliconius butterflies suggests that disassortative mating is more likely to emerge when phenotypic variation is based on self-referencing (mate preference depends on phenotype of the choosing individual, therefore dominance in relationships influence the evolution of disassortative mating).

Disassortative mating has been found with traits such as body symmetry in Amphridromus inversus snails. Normally in snails, rarely are individuals of the opposite coil able to mate with individuals of a normal coil pattern. However, it has been discovered that this species of snail frequents mating between individuals of opposing coils. It is said that the chirality of the spermatophore and the females reproductive tract have a greater chance of producing offspring. This example of disassortative mating promotes polymorphism within the population.

In the scale eating predator fish, Perissodus microlepis, disassortative mating allows the individuals with the rare phenotype of mouth-opening direction to have better success as predators.

House mice conduct disassortative mating as they prefer mates genetically dissimilar to themselves. Specifically, odor profiles in mice are strongly linked to genotypes at the MHC loci controlling changes in the immune response. When MHC-heterozygous offspring are produced, it enhances their immunocompetence because of their ability to recognize a large range of pathogens. Thus, the mice tend to prefer providing "good genes" to their offspring so they will mate with individuals with differences at the MHC loci.

In the seaweed fly, Coelopa frigida, heterozygotes at the locus alcohol dehydrogenase (Adh) have been shown to express better fitness by having higher larval density and relative viability. Females displayed disassortative mating in respect to the Adh locus because they would only mate with males of the opposite Adh genotype. It is suspected that they do this to maintain genetic variation in the population.

White-throated sparrows, Zonotrichia albicollis, prefer strong disassortative mating behaviors regarding the color of their head stripe. The single locus that controls this expression is only observed in heterozygotes. Additionally, the heterozygote arrangement of chromosome 2 from disassortative mating produced offspring of high aggression which is shown to be a social behavior that allows them to dominate their opponents.
