= Panmixia =

Random mating

Panmixia (or panmixis) means uniform random fertilization, which means individuals do not select a mate based on physical traits. A panmictic population is one where all potential parents may contribute equally to the gamete pool, and that these gametes are uniformly distributed within the gamete population (gamodeme). This assumes that there are no hybridising restrictions within the parental population: neither genetics, cytogenetics nor behavioural; and neither spatial nor temporal (see also Quantitative genetics for further discussion). True panmixia is rarely, if ever, observed in natural populations. It is a theoretical model used as a null hypothesis in population genetics. It serves as a point of comparison to understand how deviations from random mating affect allele and genotype frequencies. Therefore, all gamete recombination (fertilization) is uniformly possible. Both the Wahlund effect and the Hardy Weinberg equilibrium assume that the overall population is panmictic.

In genetics and heredity, random mating usually implies the hybridising (mating) of individuals regardless of any spatial, physical, genetical, temporal or social preference. That is, the mating between two organisms is not influenced by any environmental, nor hereditary interaction. There is no tendency for similar individuals (positive assortative mating) or dissimilar individuals (negative assortative mating) to mate. Hence, potential mates have an equal chance of being contributors to the fertilizing gamete pool. If there is no random sub-sampling of gametes involved in the fertilization cohort, panmixia has occurred. This scenario is considered rare as it is very idealized. In real life, there are many different factors that can influence mate choice. Such uniform random mating is distinct from lack of natural selection: in viability selection for instance, selection occurs before mating.

== Description ==
In simple terms, panmixia (or panmicticism) is the ability of individuals in a population to interbreed without restrictions; individuals are able to move about freely within their habitat, possibly over a range of hundreds to thousands of miles, and thus breed with other members of the population. By comparing real populations to the panmictic ideal, researchers can identify the evolutionary forces that are acting on those populations.

To signify the importance of this, imagine several different finite populations of the same species (for example: a grazing herbivore), isolated from each other by some physical characteristic of the environment (dense forest areas separating grazing lands). As time progresses, natural selection and genetic drift will slowly move each population toward genetic differentiation that would make each population genetically unique (that could eventually lead to speciation events or extirpation).

However, if the separating factor is removed before this happens (e.g. a road is cut through the forest), and the individuals are allowed to move about freely, the individual populations will still be able to interbreed. As the species's populations interbreed over time, they become more genetically uniform, functioning again as a single panmictic population.

In attempting to describe the mathematical properties of structured populations, Sewall Wright proposed a "factor of Panmixia" (P) to include in the equations describing the gene frequencies in a population, and accounting for a population's tendency towards panmixia, while a "factor of Fixation" (F) would account for a population's departure from the Hardy–Weinberg expectation, due to less than panmictic mating. This equation describes how the allelic and genotypic frequencies remain constant in a non-evolving population. In this formulation, the two quantities are complementary, i.e. P = 1 − F. From this factor of fixation, he later developed the F statistics.

== Background information ==
In a panmictic species, all of the individuals of a single species are potential partners, and the species gives no mating restrictions throughout the population. Panmixia can also be referred to as random mating, referring to a population that randomly chooses their mate, rather than sorting between the adults of the population.

Panmixia allows for species to reach genetic diversity through gene flow more efficiently than monandry species. However, outside population factors, like drought and limited food sources, can affect the way any species will mate. When scientists examine species mating to understand their mating style, they look at factors like genetic markers, genetic differentiation, and gene pool.

== Panmictic species ==
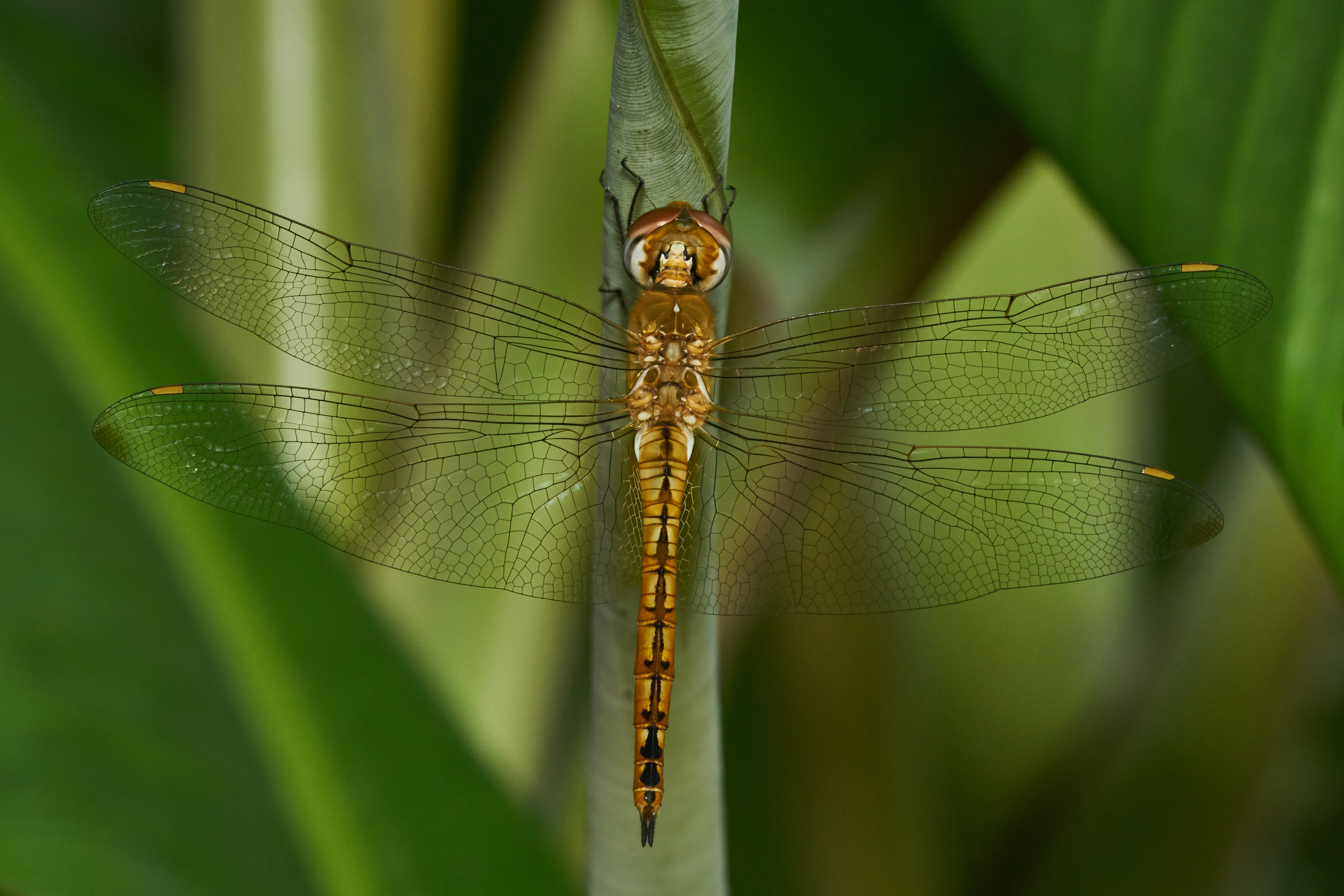
Pantala flavescens forms a global panmictic population.

Dawson's burrowing bee (Amegilla dawsoni) may be forced to aggregate in common mating areas due to uneven resource distribution in its harsh desert environment, resulting in sufficient gene flow to maintain panmixia.

The globe skimmer dragonfly (Pantala flavescens) is considered a global panmictic species.

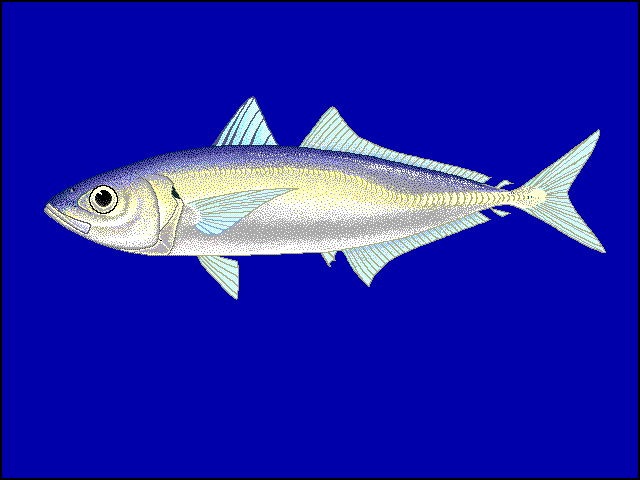
The Indian Scad population of the Indian Ocean is panmictic

Knoxdaviesia proteae, a fungus that lives on flowers of the Cape Floral Kingdom plant (Protea repens), shows extensive genetic variation and weak genetic differentiation. The fungus population is well-mixed and maintains panmixia across the population by spreading widely via beetles. This fungus uses mites to travel short distances, but it has been found to also disperse using beetles. This allows for frequent genetic exchange due to the fungus's interaction with other colonies instead of cloning itself.

Anguilla rostrata, the American eel, exhibits panmixia throughout the entire species. This allows the eel to have phenotypic variation in their offspring and survive in a wide range of environmental conditions.

== Examples of panmixia in populations ==
1. A panmictic population of Monostroma latissimum, a marine green algae, shows sympatric speciation in southwest Japanese islands. Although panmictic, the population is diversifying.
2. Indian Scad (Decapterus russelli) is found in the Indian Ocean. It forms a single panmictic stock across the ecosystem, meaning gametes are uniformly dispersed throughout the population. This panmictic stock suggests that individuals from other locations within the Indian Ocean are interbreeding due to limited genetic variation. This is caused by a rapid growth bottleneck effect due to a random event. However, significant genetic differentiation of Decapterus russelli is found between populations from the Indian Ocean and the Indo-Malay Archinpelago, attributed to isolation and environmental factors.
3. In 2016, a study was conducted on Pachygrapsus marmoratus, the marbled crab, marking them as panmictic species. The study claimed that the crabs' mating behavior is characterized by genetic differentiation due to geographic breaks across its distribution range and not panmixia.
4. In a heterogeneous environment such as the forests of Oregon, United States, Douglas squirrels (Tamiasciurus douglasii) exhibit local patterns of adaptation. In a study conducted by Chaves (2014) a population along an entire transect was found to be panmictic. Traits observed in this study included skull shape, fur color, etc.
5. Swordfish based in the Indian Ocean (Xiphias gladius) have been found to be a single panmictic population. Markers used in the study carried out by Muths et al. (2013) found large spatial and temporal homogeneity in genetic structure satisfactory in order to consider the swordfish a singular panmictic population.

== See also ==
- Population genetics
- Quantitative genetics
- Assortative mating (one form of non-random mating, where similar phenotypes hybridise)
- Disassortative mating (where phenotypic opposites are hybridised)
- Monogamy: A mating system in which one male mates with just one female, and one female mates with just one male, in breeding season
- Polygyny: A mating system in which a male fertilizes the eggs of several partners in breeding season
- Sexual selection: A form of natural selection that occurs when individuals vary in their ability to compete with others for mates or to attract members of the opposite sex
- Fitness: A measure of the genes contributed to the next generation by an individual, often stated in terms of the number of surviving offspring produced by the individual
