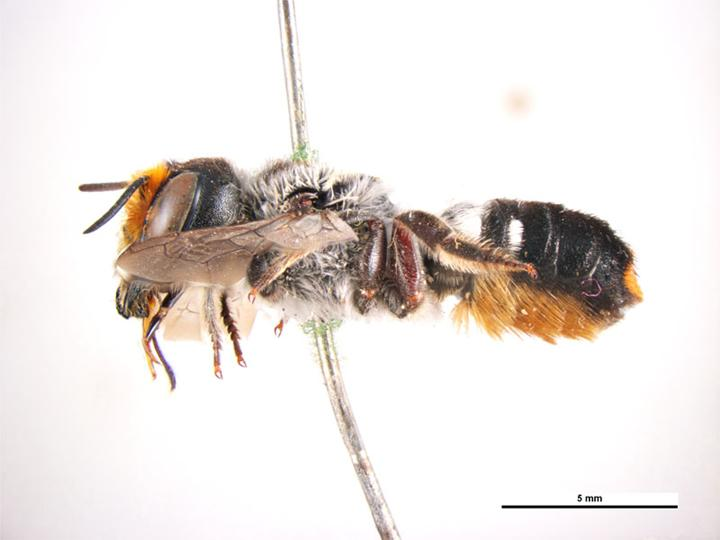

Scientific classification
- Kingdom: Animalia
- Phylum: Arthropoda
- Clade: Pancrustacea
- Class: Insecta
- Order: Hymenoptera
- Family: Megachilidae
- Genus: Megachile
- Species: M. erythropyga

Binomial name
- Megachile erythropyga Smith, 1853

= Megachile erythropyga =

Species of resin bee (Megachile)

Megachile erythropyga is a species of bee native to southern Australia. A member of the family Megachilidae, it was described in 1853. Males and females both have orange facial hair and an orange hair spot on the end of the abdomen. The male forelegs are unmodified. This species is commonly found using man-made bee hotels, in which it seals each nest with a resin plug.

== Taxonomy ==
Megachile erythropyga was described by British entomologist Frederick Smith in 1853.

== Description ==
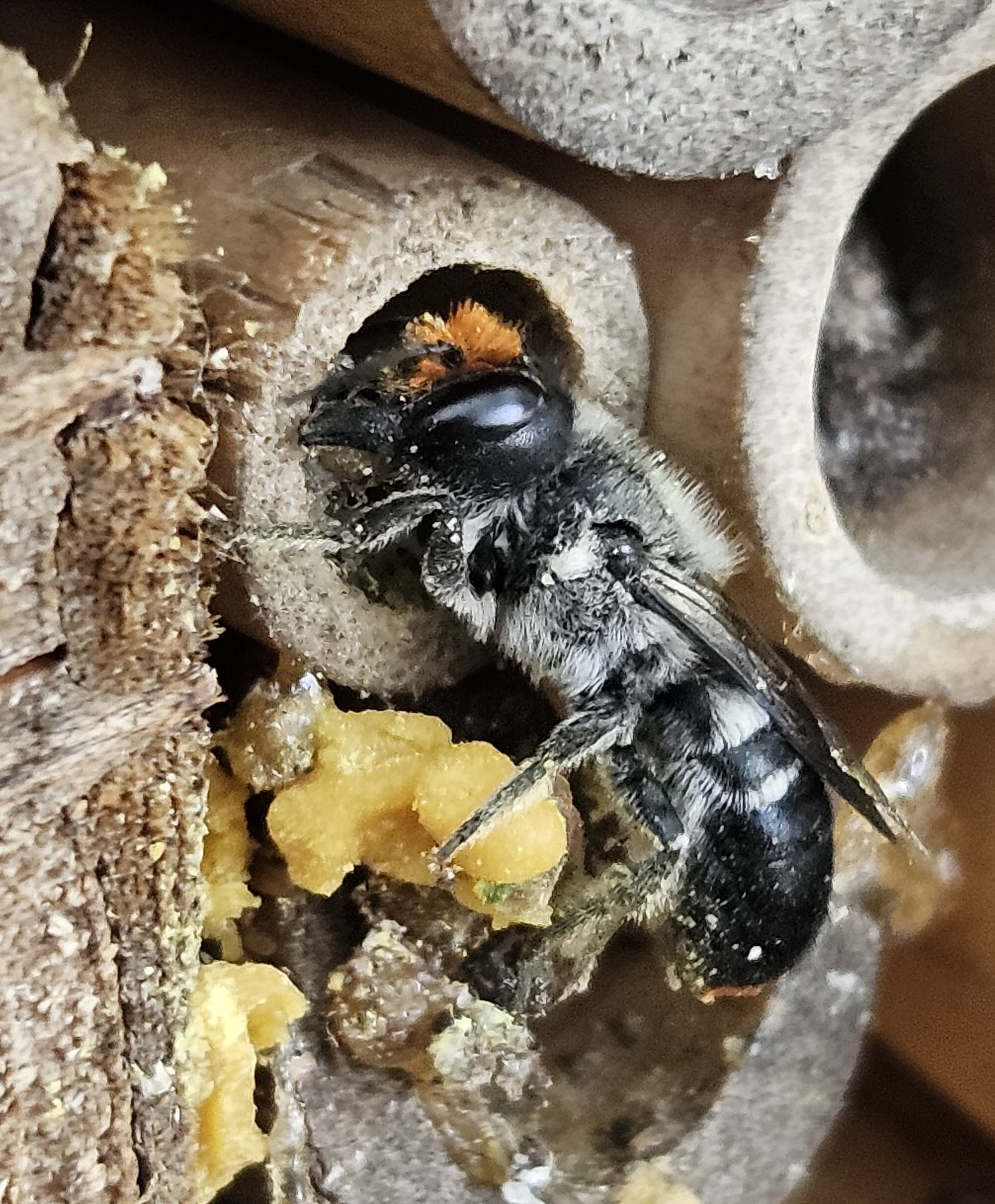
Female

Males are around 10mm long, and females are larger at around 14mm long. Both sexes have bright orange facial hair and an orange spot of hair on the end of the abdomen. There is long white hair on the first abdominal segment and a small patch of white hair on each side of the second segment. The wings are smoky with black veins. The female’s scopal hairs for collecting pollen are a very pale yellow, and located under the abdomen. The forelegs of the male do not have any of the modifications that can be seen on the males of many other Megachile species.

== Distribution and habitat ==
M. erythropyga occurs across southern Australia in the states of Western Australia, South Australia, Victoria, New South Wales and Tasmania. It can be found in bushland and urban areas.

== Nesting and Ecology ==
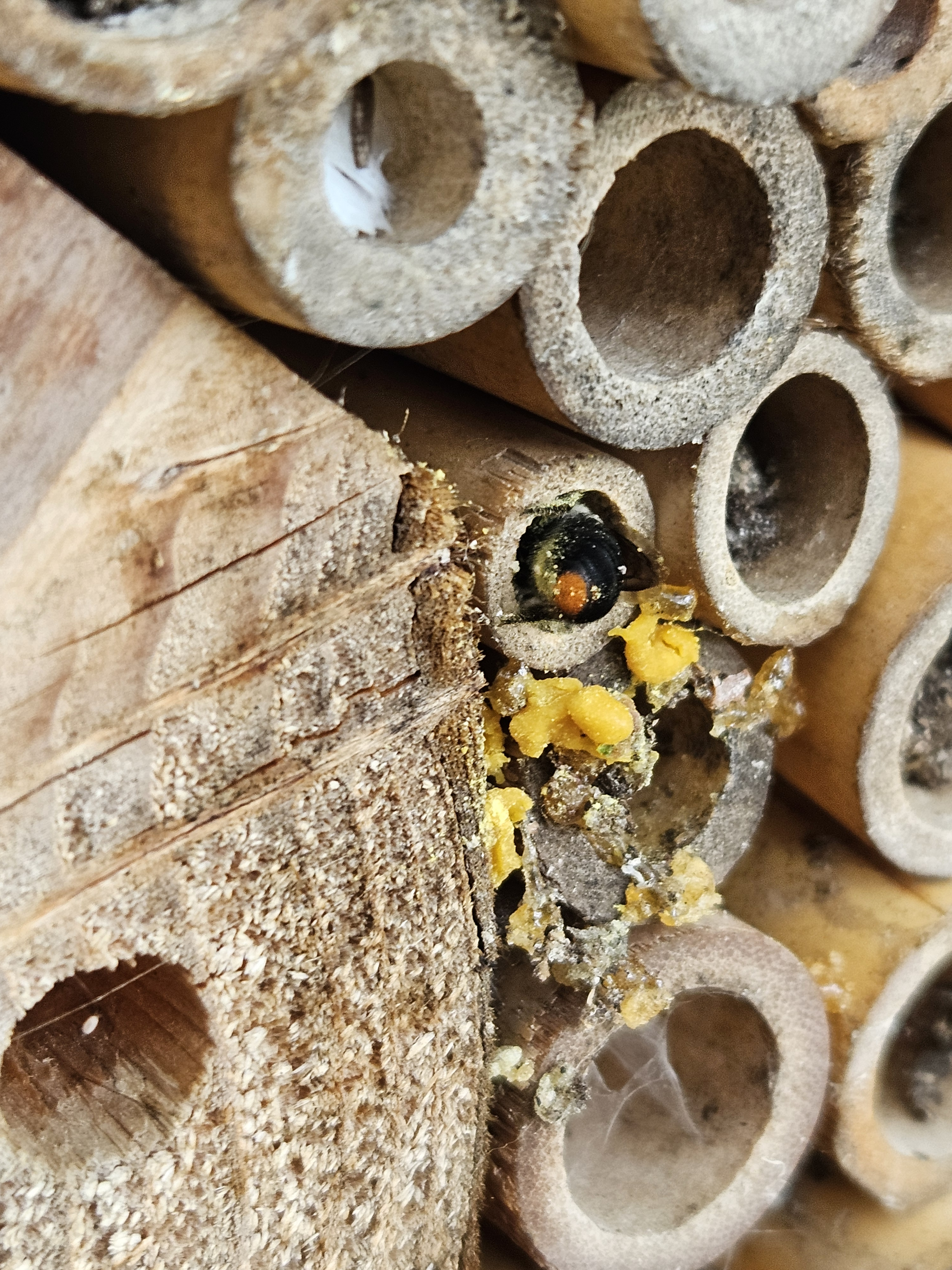
Female nesting in a bee hotel.

Megachile erythropyga females nest in narrow cavities such as beetle borer holes in dead wood. They will also use man-made holes including hose reel bolt holes and bee hotels. This was the most recorded species in a study on bee hotel use in southwest Western Australia. Nests are made in cavities ranging from 5mm to 8mm in diameter. The female uses resin to create individual cells within a nest. She lays an egg in each cell and provides each one with a pollen and nectar provision to feed the larva until pupation. Research conducted in Victoria using paper straw bee hotels found the number of cells within a nest ranged from 3 to 9, with an average of about 5 cells per nest. Each nest is sealed with a resin plug, which sometimes incorporates other materials like sand, wood drillings, grass or leaf pieces. The nests are susceptible to invasion by wasps of the Gasteruption genus; however, Megachile erythropyga females have been documented fighting back and evicting these wasps from nesting cavities.

Megachile erythropyga is polylectic. It has been observed visiting the flowers of Lotus, Cullen, Eucalyptus and Melaleuca. The adult lifespan is about six weeks.
