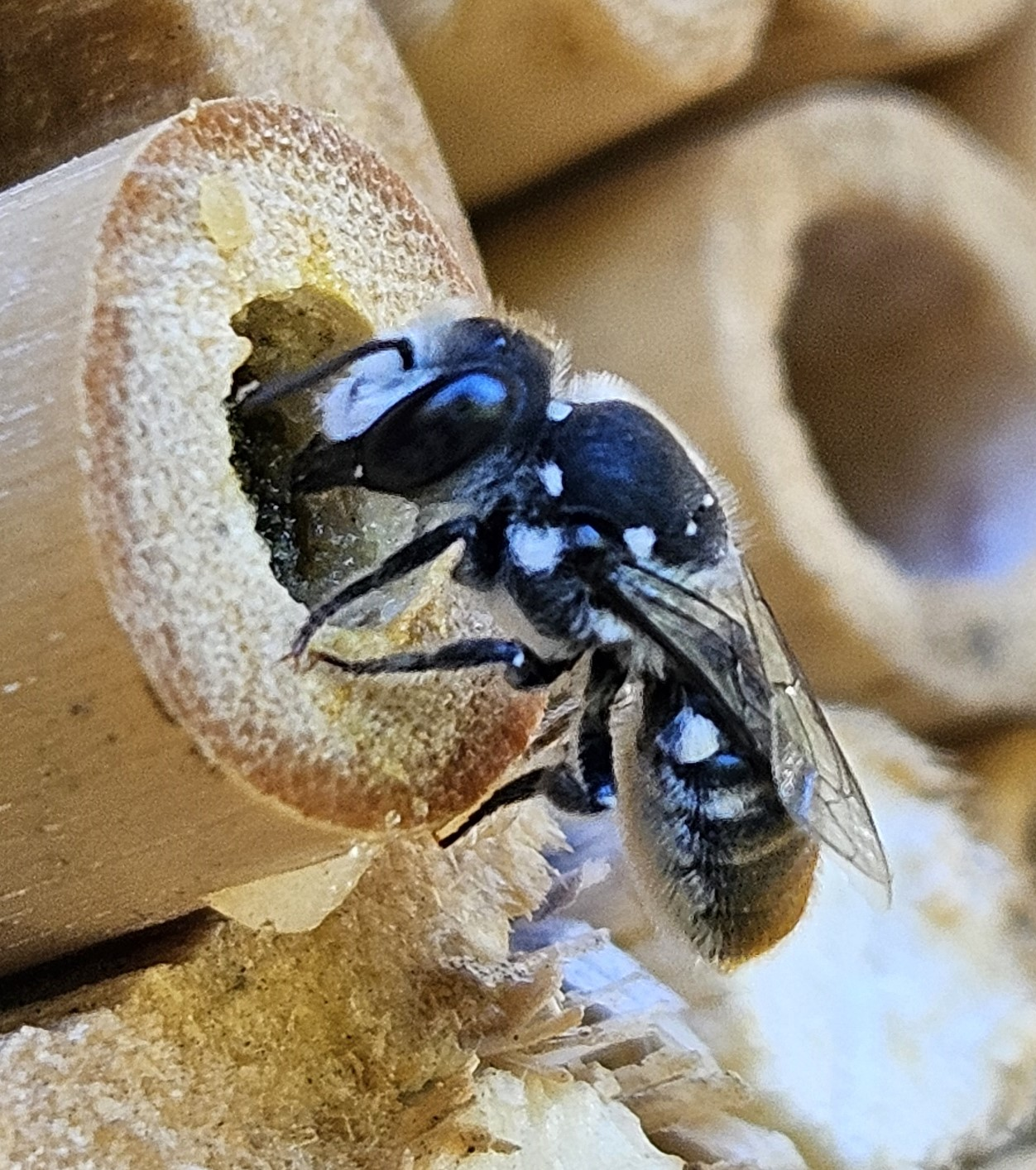
- Female sealing nest

Scientific classification
- Kingdom: Animalia
- Phylum: Arthropoda
- Class: Insecta
- Order: Hymenoptera
- Family: Megachilidae
- Genus: Megachile
- Species: M. nigrovittata

Binomial name
- Megachile nigrovittata Cockerell, 1906

= Megachile nigrovittata =

Species of leafcutter bee (Megachile)

Megachile nigrovittata is a species of solitary bee from the family Megachilidae. It is native to Australia, where it can be found in most mainland states and territories. It was described by Theodore D. A. Cockerell in 1906. In both sexes the last three abdominal segments are covered in short orange hair, and the males have elaborately modified front legs. Females construct nests in existing cavities which they seal with resin. This species visits the flowers of various native plants, and it has shown potential to be an important pollinator of lucerne crops.

== Taxonomy ==
Megachile nigrovittata was first described by American entomologist Theodore D. A. Cockerell in 1906. The holotype is a male that was collected near the north-west coast of Australia, and stored in the Natural History Museum, London. The hind legs were missing when it was described.

In the 1960s Charles Michener redescribed the genus Chalicodoma, and included in it the species that use resin or mud to make their nests, such as M. nigrovittata. Therefore, the binomial name became Chalicodoma nigrovittata. In the 2000s the same author merged Chalicodoma back into the Megachile genus, which reverted this species back to its original name.

== Description ==
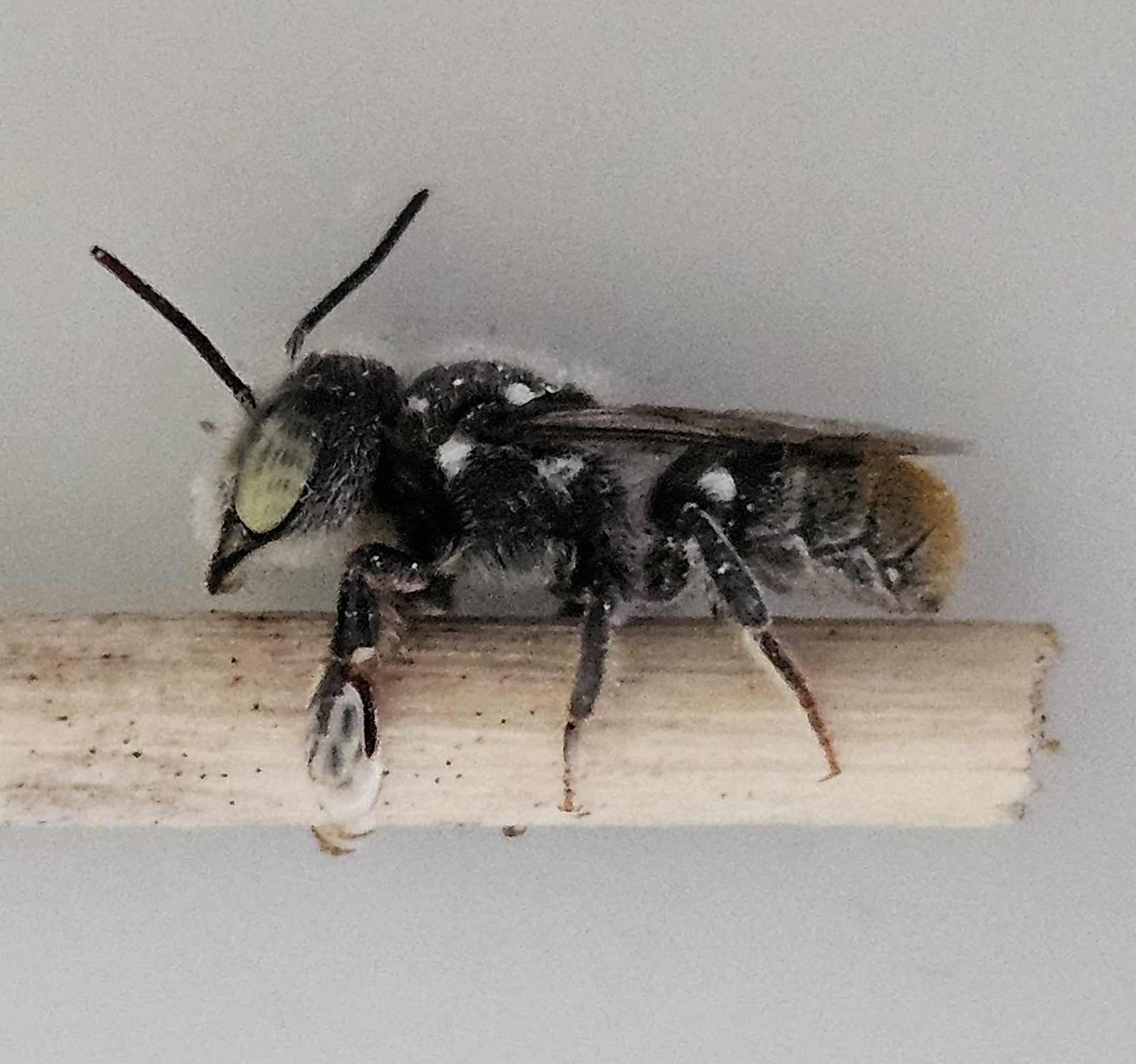
Male

Males are slightly over 8 mm in length. The last three abdominal segments are covered in short, orange hair. The middle legs are dark reddish, with a small light patch on the tibia, a white spur, and a bend in the basal joint of the tarsus. The labrum is long with the corners rounded at the front. The face is covered with yellowish-white hair and the eyes are light yellowish-green. The antennae are brown on the underside. The wings are transparent, and the stigma (thickened spot on the front margin of the forewing) is pale with a dark margin. There is a row of pits across the base of the propodeum.

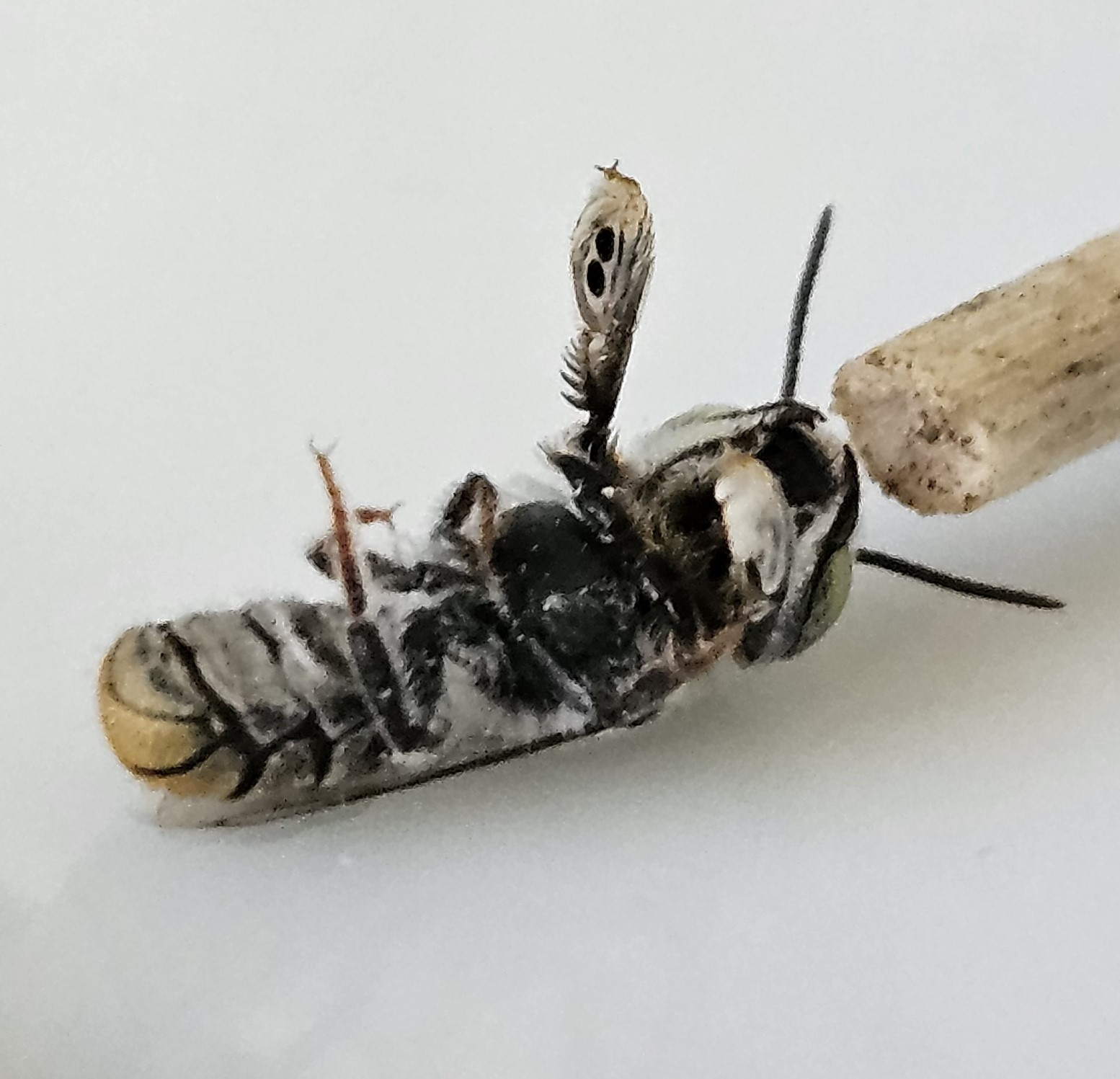
Male

The males of Megachile nigrovittata (as in the males of many species from this genus) have elaborately modified front legs. The tibiae are black and shiny with a white patch on the end. The tarsi are white and expanded, with the first three joints forming a large oblong structure. The structure is concave on the underside, and on the upper side it has a long black streak with two branches coming off the front. There is also a dark red-brown band extending around the hind margin of the first joint. In the middle of the oblong structure there are two oblong black spots, which appear as blue shades on the upper surface. The fourth and fifth joints are much smaller, but also broadened. The fifth joint has a lateral projection, and the claws are white.

== Distribution and habitat ==
Megachile nigrovittata has been recorded in New South Wales, Northern Territory, Queensland, South Australia and Western Australia.

== Behaviour and ecology ==
This species has been recorded visiting the flowers of Eucalyptus, Acacia and Atalaya hemiglauca. Females carry pollen using specialised hairs on the underside of the abdomen, and they are solitary. They construct nests in existing cavities, including man-made bee hotels. The female deposits an egg and larval provision in each brood cell, and then seals the nest with resin collected from nearby vegetation.

== Importance to humans ==
Researchers from the University of Adelaide have found Megachile nigrovittata to be a potentially important pollinator of lucerne crops.
