= Leioproctus zephyr =

Scientific classification
- Kingdom: Animalia
- Phylum: Arthropoda
- Clade: Pancrustacea
- Class: Insecta
- Order: Hymenoptera
- Family: Colletidae
- Genus: Leioproctus
- Species: L. zephyr

Binomial name
- Leioproctus zephyr Prendergast 2022

Species of bee, endemic to Australia

Leioproctus zephyr

Scientific classification
- Kingdom: Animalia
- Phylum: Arthropoda
- Clade: Pancrustacea
- Class: Insecta
- Order: Hymenoptera
- Family: Colletidae
- Genus: Leioproctus
- Species: L. zephyr

Binomial name
- Leioproctus zephyr Prendergast, 2022

Leioproctus zephyr is a species of bee in the family Colletidae and subfamily Colletinae. It is endemic to Australia. It was collected by Australian entomologist Kit Prendergast and described by her in 2022.

== Etymology ==
Prendergast named the species after her dog, "Zephyr".

== Distribution and habitat ==
The species occurs in south-west Western Australia. The type locality is Star Swamp near Perth, where it was collected in Banksia woodland.

== Behaviour ==
The adults are flying mellivores.
