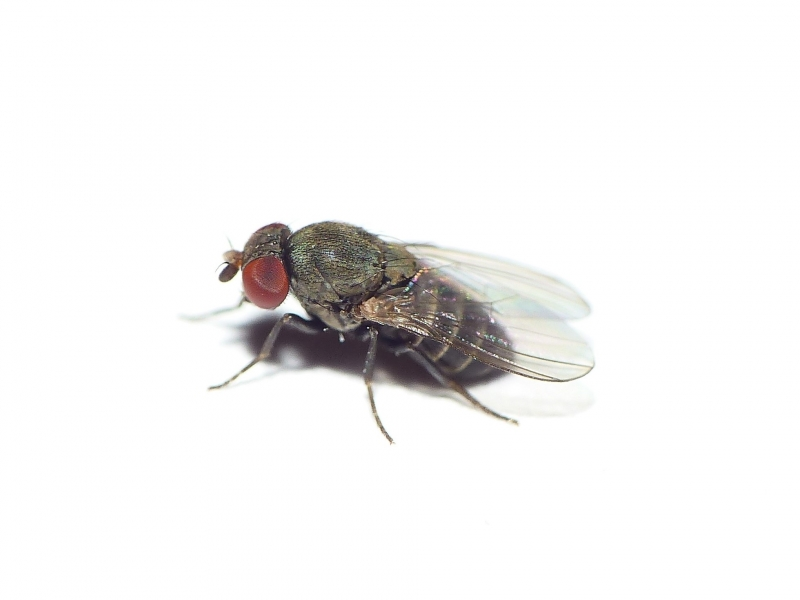

Scientific classification
- Kingdom: Animalia
- Phylum: Arthropoda
- Class: Insecta
- Order: Diptera
- Family: Drosophilidae
- Genus: Cacoxenus
- Species: C. indagator

Binomial name
- Cacoxenus indagator Loew, 1858

= Cacoxenus indagator =

Species of fly

Cacoxenus indagator is a species of fruit fly native to central and southern Europe. It is a kleptoparasite, laying its eggs in the pollen-filled nest cells of mason bees. On account of its ability to break out of those cells once hatched, it is commonly known as the Houdini fly.

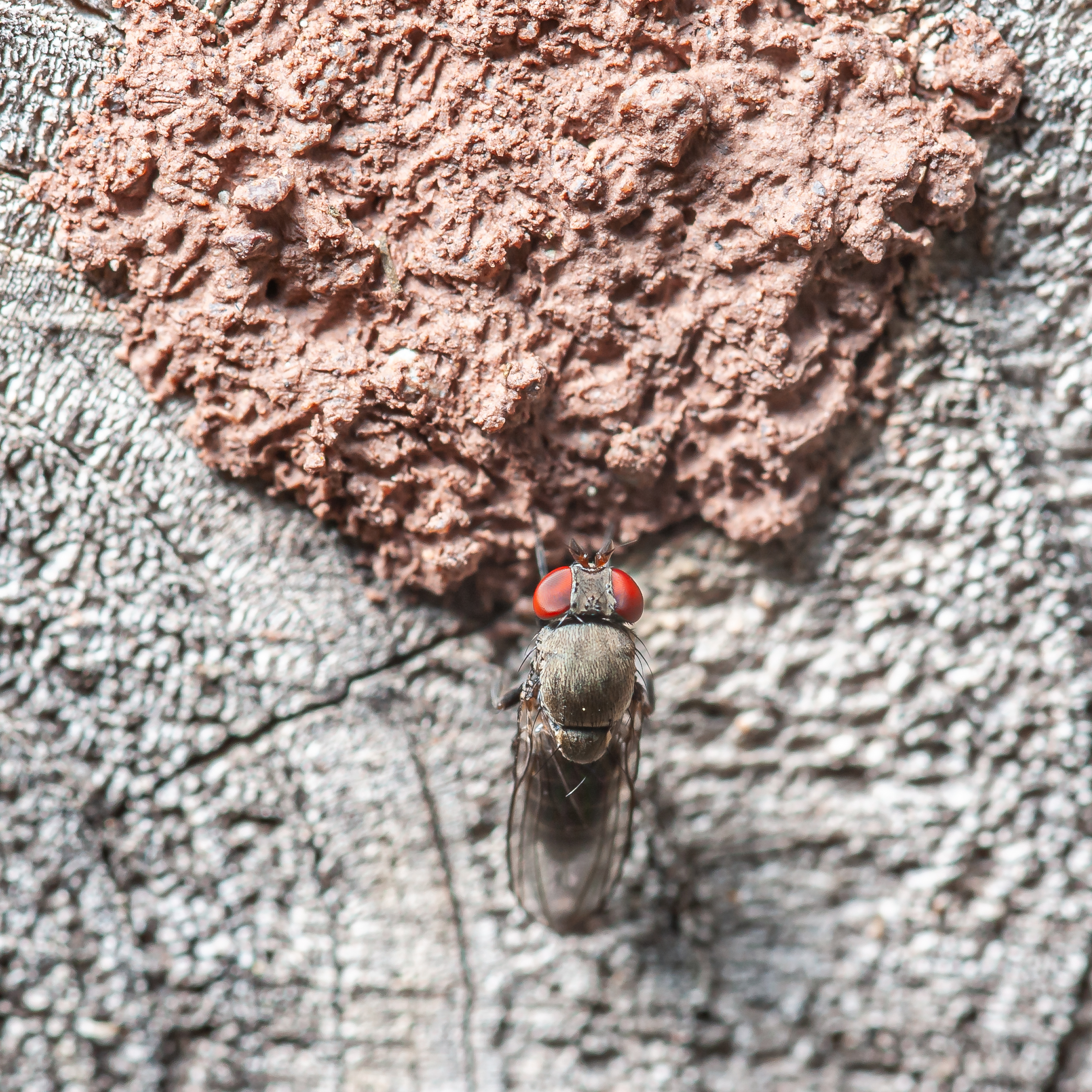
Cacoxenus indagator at a newly closed nest of Osmia cornuta
