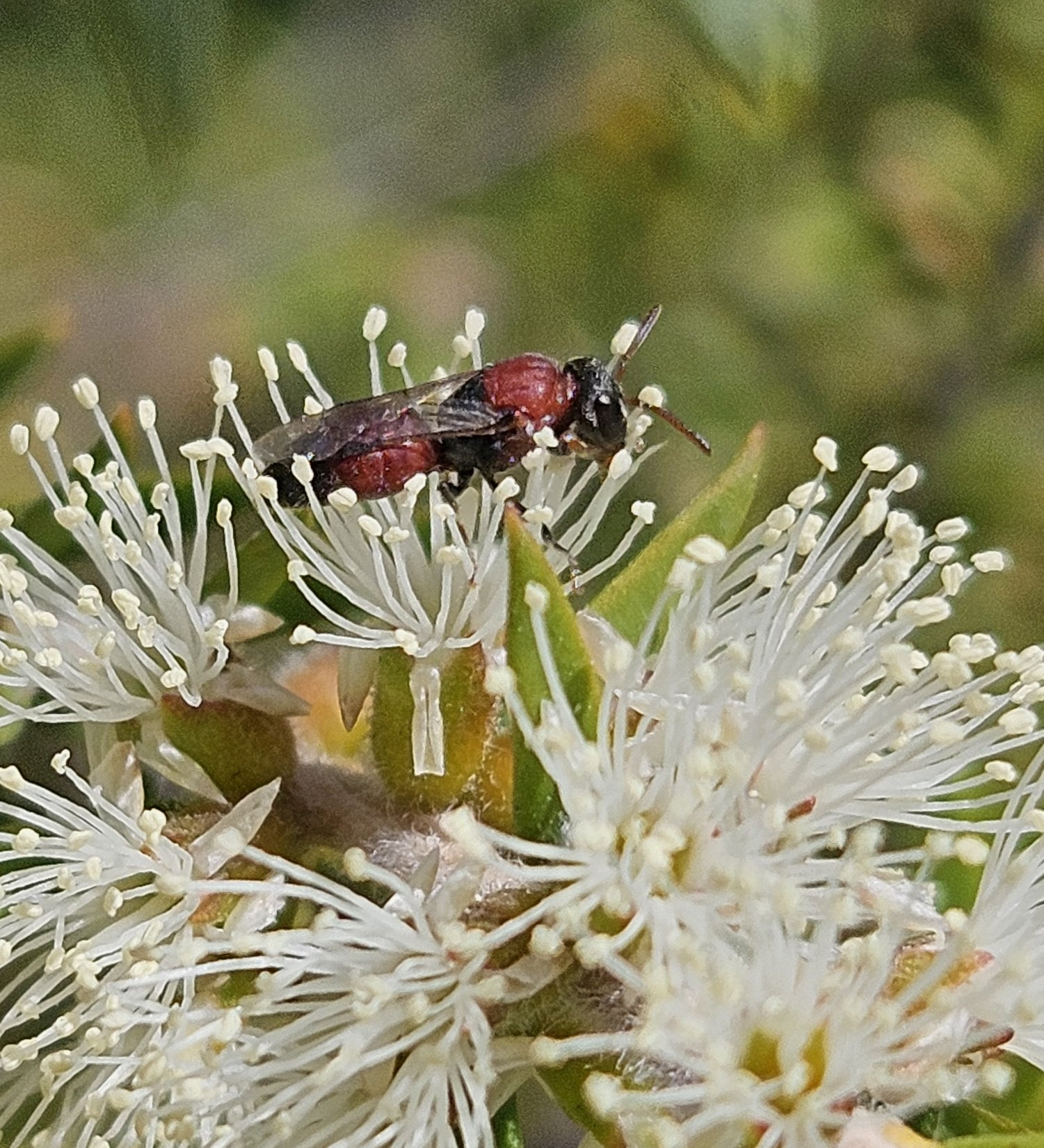
- Female on Melaleuca

Scientific classification
- Kingdom: Animalia
- Phylum: Arthropoda
- Clade: Pancrustacea
- Class: Insecta
- Order: Hymenoptera
- Family: Colletidae
- Genus: Hylaeus
- Species: H. proximus

Binomial name
- Hylaeus proximus (Smith, 1879)

= Hylaeus proximus =

Species of bee

Hylaeus proximus, commonly known as the lesser red masked bee, is a species of bee in the family Colletidae. It was described by Frederick Smith in 1879, and it is widely distributed across mainland Australia. Females are 5mm long, with a partly red abdomen and thorax and two white lines on the face. Males are 4mm long, with a darker abdomen and a black thorax. It forages on a wide variety of native flowering plants.

== Taxonomy ==
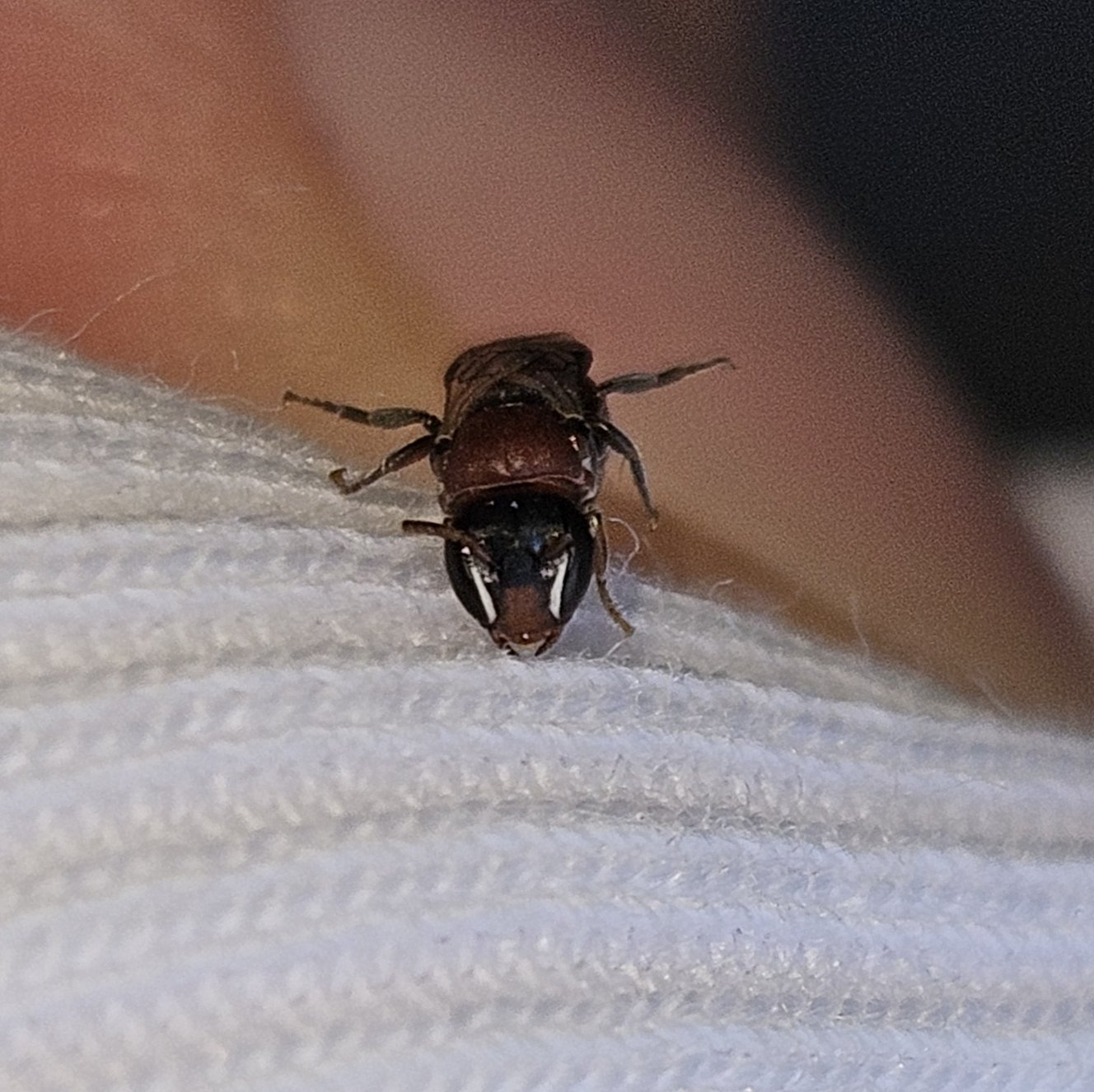
Female with face markings visible.

Hylaeus proximus was first described by British entomologist Frederick Smith in 1879. The holotype was a female collected in Geraldton, Western Australia.

In 1913 Theodore Cockerell described a female from Purnong, South Australia, which differed from the type specimen. He called it "variety A". In 1935 Tarlton Rayment described a similar female, also from Purnong, which he called "variety B". Rayment also produced a key which could be used to separate Hylaeus proximus from similar species.

== Description ==
This is a small species of bee, with females measuring approximately 5mm long and males approximately 4mm long. The propodeum is roughly textured in both sexes.

Females are partly black, but much of the thorax and the front segments of the abdomen are red. The antennae, clypeus, labrum and mandibles are red. Females have a narrow white line on each side of the face, which extend along the eyes and up to the antennae. The front and middle legs have red tibiae and tarsi, with the middle tibiae darker above. The hind legs have reddish joints. The wings are transparent and iridescent. The abdomen is shiny.

The variety A described by Cockerell has a dull white mark at the base of each hind tibia, red axillae, two white marks on the prothorax, and the tubercles have the apical half white.

The variety B described by Rayment lacks the white marks on the hind tibiae and the prothorax.

Males have an entirely black thorax and a darker abdomen than females.

== Distribution and habitat ==
Hylaeus proximus is widely distributed across Australia, with records from all states and territories except for Tasmania.

== Behaviour and ecology ==
This species can be very abundant at flowers of Eucalyptus and Melaleuca. It has also been recorded foraging on flowers of the following genera: Scaevola, Angophora, Hakea, Banskia, Grevillea, Acacia, Bursaria, Eremophila, Leucopogon, Senna, Callistemon, Jacksonia, Brachychiton, Calytrix, Leptospermum and Schinus. Males form roosting aggregations, in which they typically perch crosswise on stems.
