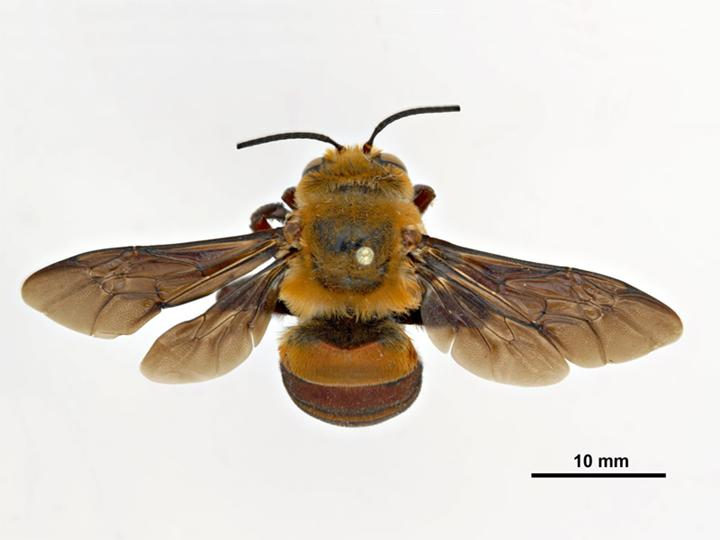

Scientific classification
- Kingdom: Animalia
- Phylum: Arthropoda
- Clade: Pancrustacea
- Class: Insecta
- Order: Hymenoptera
- Family: Apidae
- Genus: Amegilla
- Species: A. dawsoni

Binomial name
- Amegilla dawsoni Rayment, 1951

= Amegilla dawsoni =

Species of burrowing bee from Australia

Amegilla dawsoni, sometimes called the Dawson's burrowing bee, is a species of bee that nests by the thousands in arid claypans in Western Australia. It is a long tongued bee, of the tribe Anthophorini and genus Amegilla, the second largest genus in Anthophorini.

The Dawson's burrowing bee is one of the largest Australian bee species, growing to be 23 millimetres (0.91 in) in length and 45 millimetres (1.8 in) in wingspan. With the exception of their faces, the bees are covered in brown fur, if male, or brown and white fur if female. They are similar in size and coloring to Australian carpenter bees.

They are known solitary nesters. Though each female bee will build her own nest, they aggregate in large communities that give the appearance of colonies. Their nests are dug into the ground, with individual capsules created for each brood cell. Each female will only breed once in their breeding season.

The males of the species are dimorphic, based on brood provisioning strategies during development. The larger males – called majors – tend to aggressively patrol emergence areas, and will compete in physical fights to mate with virgin or recently mated females. On the other hand, the smaller males – called minors – which make up 80% of the male population, will wait at the fringes of the emergence area and will mate only with females who are able to fly away unmated from the immediate vicinity of their natal nests. Females indicate receptiveness or lack of receptiveness to mating by emitting particular mixes of chemical signals based on whether she has mated previously.

The bee feeds only on 4 genera of plants located in the deserts of Western Australia. This resource pressure has been implicated in forcing the bees to be panmictic.

== Taxonomy and phylogeny ==
Amegilla dawsoni is part of the genus Amegilla in the tribe Anthophorini, the long tongued bees. Amegilla is the second largest genus within Anthophorini, behind the genus Anthophora. Amegilla has been divided into 11 subgenera, altogether containing over 250 species. The genus contains bees located purely in Old World, appearing throughout Europe, Africa and Asia, with one subgenus endemic to Australia.

The genera Amegilla and Anthophora are monophyletic, based on a series non-homoplasious traits. Additionally, Amegilla is strongly characterized by several autapomorphies, including a gonostylus, the male phallic organ, that is fused to the gonocoxite, or interior region of copulation, and a curved maxillary palpus with distinctive surrounding fringe. These traits when subjected to bootstrap analysis yielded 100% cladistic support.

== Description and identification ==
=== Appearance ===
This dark-winged bee species is among Australia's largest bees, similar in size and coloring to Xylocopa, or carpenter bee, species. The bee can get up to 23 mm in body length and 45 mm in wing span. Both sexes are densely furry, with the exception of their lower facial regions, which jut outwards and tend to be bare, and colored anywhere from light yellow to dark brown.

=== Sexual dimorphism ===
The females of this bee species tend to be consistently sized, with head widths around 6.4–7.4 mm. The males, however, are dimorphic. They come in two sizes predominantly, the larger majors and the smaller minors. The majors and minors differ greatly in size, with head widths ranging from 4.9 to 7.3 mm. Minor males have been defined as those with head sizes less than 6.3 mm, while major males have head sizes above 6.3 mm. Males are also allometrically sized, meaning that those with larger heads also have larger mandibles and broader abdomens. The largest of the males are comparable in size to the females. Sexual dimorphism can also be seen in the bee coloring. The males of this species are covered in brown hair. Meanwhile, female A. dawsoni heads and thoraxes are covered in white hair.

== Distribution and habitat ==
The Amegilla dawsoni is located only in Australia. The bees can be found in the arid regions on the Western half of the continent. They are widespread across this region, with the northern and southernmost extremes of their mating and nesting distributions being approximately 700 kilometers apart. This region is known for its limited and randomly distributed rainfall, which can result in a resource deficit of flowering plants. In this case, the bee has been known to migrate north and south along its distribution to nest in better-suited environments.

== Nesting ==
=== Nest building ===
This bee species practices solitary nesting, though often the nests are clustered close together. An active nesting colony may contain up to 10,000 burrows. The female bee builds her nest by digging straight down into clay, or other densely packed soil and dirt. She will dig to depths between 15 and 35 centimeters. The female bee will then turn to dig horizontally. In the horizontal shaft, she will dig downwards to create brood cells. The horizontal shaft is extended with each subsequent brood cell that she creates. Occasionally, females will layer two brood cells on top of one another in a doublet formation. The female bee will prepare the inside of each cell by laying down a layer of wax. She fills the layered cell with nectar and pollen from four different plant genera. With this wet mixture in place, she will lay the egg on top of the cell, and then cap the cell with mud. She repeats this until she is done laying her eggs.

=== Nesting cycle ===
The flight season for this bee ranges from the later months of winter to early spring. The bee is univoltine – it produces only one brood per breeding season. After remaining dormant until the following winter, the brood which had been laid the previous year emerges and begins the flight season and mating process. The males of the species will emerge from the nests before their female counterparts. Additionally, the minor males, with head widths less than 6.3 mm, tended to emerge before the major males, with head widths greater than 6.3 mm, over the course of the entire breeding season. Even within the span of single days in the emergence period, minor males tended to surface earlier in the day than major males. This may be due to an evolutionary pressure which forces smaller males to emerge earlier than their larger counterparts to avoid competition for mating with larger individuals. Male emergence is also prolonged, and can last several weeks into the flight season. This results in a large amount of emergence overlap between males and females of the species. This might be due to the increased fitness of late-emerging males to mate with females later in the season, given that the early-emerging competition would already have died.

=== Nesting competition ===
During the beginnings of their nesting cycles, female A. dawsoni often enter occupied nests with absent hosts. In the event of a clash between intruder and resident, the conflict almost always ends with the resident bee evicting the intruder in a short brawl, lasting only a few seconds. There does not appear to be any advantage of size for bees that are attempting an intrusion, in that larger bees do not seem to be more successful in removing the resident bee from her burrow. One explanation for why this species engages in this behavior, despite its low level of success, is that intruding bees are attempting to find nests where the owners have died or disappeared. This is a cost-saving mechanism by which the intruding bee can save energy which she would otherwise spend on burrowing and brood cell creation. When an owner does happen to return, the intruder allows herself to be removed in a short and non-lethal confrontation so she might continue her search for an abandoned nest.

== Mating ==
=== Mating patterns ===
Two distinct mating patterns arise in this bee species, due to the two size classes of males. The larger males (majors) will patrol the emergence areas of the female bees. Meanwhile, the smaller class of male bee, the minors, patrol the outer perimeter of the emergence area, and wait to mate with females who escape the vicinity of their emergence holes without having mated with a major male. 80% of the male population in A. dawsoni is made up of minors, despite the fact that 90% of females mate with the major bees.

When a male locates a receptive female bee, he will mount her back, and ride her over to the nearest available vegetation, after which he will begin copulation, which occurs in 3 phases. In the first phase, the male will mount the female and will flicker his wings. In the second phase, upon insertion of the male genitalia, the male will rapidly thrust for a few seconds. After this, he will enter the third phase, where he will disengage his genitalia and will probe the external female genitalia. After this, copulation is complete. Female bees will rarely mate more than once – this causes fierce competition between males for mating opportunities.

=== Sexual signaling ===
Female bees of this species indicate sexual receptiveness with a mixture of semiochemicals, signalling chemicals. Cuticular hydrocarbons, long chained fatty acids implicated in the prevention of insect desiccation, have also been implicated in the process of sexual signaling. Emergent virgin A. dawsoni females release a particular mix of CHCs to indicate their receptivity to patrolling males. This blend includes significant amounts of tricosane, pentacosane and heptacosane.

This receptivity blend improves fitness for females, who can signal receptivity to mating, and induce competition, such that the strongest competitors with the best phenotypes and genotypes, will father their broods. Male ability to recognize these signals also allows for males to reduce energy wasted by approaching emerging male bees, or to engage in competition with other males over already mated females.

Upon mating, the female A. dawsoni will begin a chemical shift to indicate that she is no longer receptive to mating attempts. Then she will begin the nesting phase of her life cycle. This shift takes some time. Therefore, recently mated females are still attractive to patrolling bees, and must actively resist copulation. The shift involves actively repressing the production of the receptivity chemicals, and creating a chemical called tetramethylhexadecatrienol, which is unique to nesting females. Additionally, other volatile chemical agents potentially produced in the Dufour's gland have been implicated in male repulsion signaling.

=== Panmixia ===
Amegilla dawsoni has been shown to be a panmictic species, where individuals are equally likely to mate with any other individual in the population. This results in completely unmitigated genetic flow, and populations with no genetic differentiation. This is a relatively rare phenomenon, especially in bees, where intraspecies genetic differentiation is common. One explanation that has been offered for this phenomenon in A. dawsoni is the irregular distribution of flowering resources due to the arid conditions of the Australian desert. These conditions could force populations in their flight seasons to aggregate in areas with abundant resources, allowing for populations that are several hundreds of kilometers apart to mix via mating.

== Brood provisioning ==
The female bees of this species can control whether their male offspring are large (major) or small (minor). They control this by differential provisioning – the female will invest more in terms of food and cell size for the major bees.

In the beginning of the flight season when resources are abundant, the females will produce major males almost to the exclusion of minor males. Alternatively, towards the end of the season, when resources are low and foraging times have increased, females produce minor males almost exclusively.

Additionally, when females create doublet brood cells where one egg rests on top of the other, the top cell is almost always a minor male. The bottom cell is either a major male or a female. This is due to the early emergence in the season of minor males.

== Diet and feeding ==
The female bees do not need to enter the flower corollas to collect nectar. They collect nectar by inserting their long proboscis into the flower. These bees collect nectar from four main genera of plant. They will forage at these plants even if there are more readily available sources of nectar and pollen.

These include:

- Cassia
- Eremophila
- Solanum
- Trichodesma

== Interactions with other species ==
=== Parasites ===
Amegilla dawsoni is parasitized by the cleptoparasitic Miltogramma rectangularis, or Miltogrammine fly. These flies enter the brood cells of the bee, and feed off of the provisions meant for the developing brood. They enter the brood cells by means of adult female Miltogrammine flies larvipositing on adult female bees. The adult female bees then enter the cells and deposit the parasitic larvae in the vicinity of their own brood. It has been hypothesized that these parasites, and their proclivity for food theft, have acted as a selective pressure for A. dawsoni to produce smaller males (minors), which require less food, thus explaining the preponderance of minor males despite their reduced sexual fitness. This is unlikely, however, given that the reproductive benefit of producing large males seems to outweigh the losses created by brood parasitization.

== Popular culture ==
Australian wild bee ecologist Kit Prendergast has a large tattoo of two Amegilla dawsoni mating on her right shoulder.
