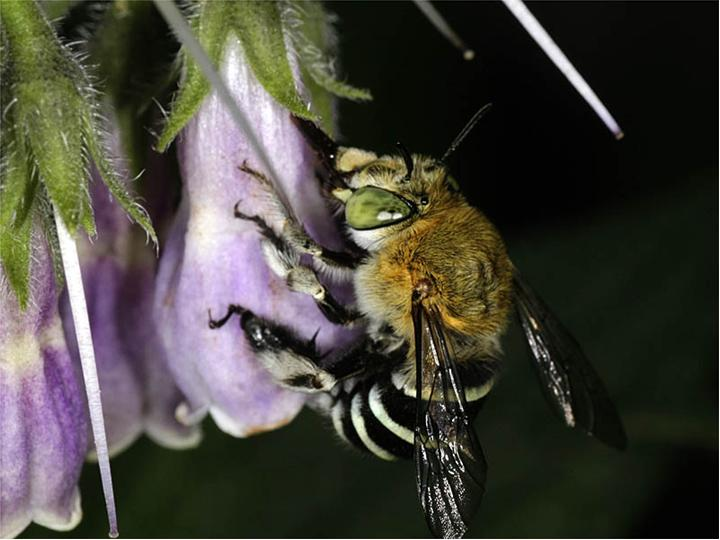
- Foraging female

Scientific classification
- Kingdom: Animalia
- Phylum: Arthropoda
- Class: Insecta
- Order: Hymenoptera
- Family: Apidae
- Genus: Amegilla
- Subgenus: Zonamegilla
- Species: A. asserta

Binomial name
- Amegilla asserta (Cockerell, 1926)

Synonyms
- Amegilla perasserta Rayment, 1947; Anthophora perasserta Rayment, 1947; Anthophora perasserta assertiella Rayment, 1947

= Amegilla asserta =

Species of bee

Amegilla asserta is a species of bee endemic to Australia, belonging to the family Apidae subfamily Apinae. Females forage by performing buzz pollination.

== Distribution ==
Amegilla asserta is found in eastern Australia, from Eyre Peninsula in South Australia, across temperate regions of Victoria and New South Wales, and along the east coast of Queensland. The range includes the cities of Adelaide, Melbourne, Sydney and Brisbane. A. asserta is the more common of the two species found in Melbourne, followed by A. chlorocyanea.
