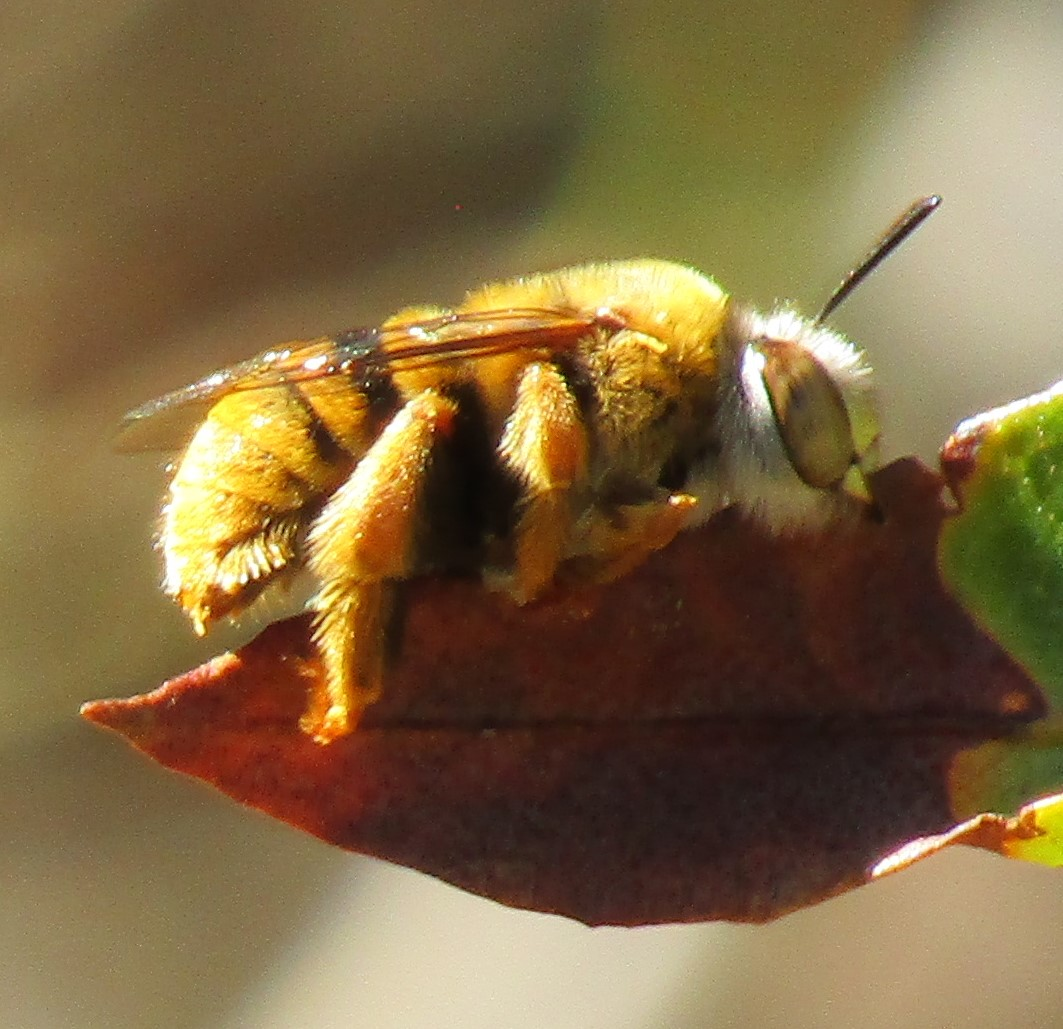

Scientific classification
- Kingdom: Animalia
- Phylum: Arthropoda
- Class: Insecta
- Order: Hymenoptera
- Family: Apidae
- Genus: Amegilla
- Species: A. albiceps

Binomial name
- Amegilla albiceps (Rayment, 1951)

Synonyms
- Asaropoda albiceps (Rayment, 1951); Asaropoda dentiventris (Rayment, 1951); Asaropoda meltonensis (Rayment, 1951); Asaropoda victoriensis (Rayment, 1951)

= Amegilla albiceps =

Species of insect

Amegilla albiceps is a species of bee native to Australia. It has a southern temperate distribution, with records from South Australia, Victoria and New South Wales. A member of the genus Amegilla, it was described in 1951 by Tarlton Rayment. Adults have been found from October to April, and they have been observed visiting flowers of the mistletoe genus Amyema.

== Description ==
With a body length of approximately 14mm, Amegilla albiceps is roughly the same size as a worker honeybee. It has a white head, and a predominantly orange abdomen. There is a band of black hairs on the second abdominal segment. The front legs are mostly orange. The mid and hind legs are orange on the outer surfaces, and brown-black on the inner surfaces. The mandibles are yellow at the base, black-brown at the tip. The proboscis is orange and the clypeus is yellow.
