= Kit Prendergast =

Australian wild bee ecologist

Kit Prendergast, nicknamed "The Bee Babette", is a wild bee ecologist from Perth, Western Australia.

== Education ==
She studied at Curtin University and gained her PhD after researching the biodiversity of native bees and pollination networks in urban areas, along with how to conserve them and the impact of honeybees on native bees. Prendergast has also researched and written about urban area issues for bees, focusing on Perth and the south west of Western Australia.

== Career ==
Prendergast goes under the moniker "The Bee Babette" when performing as a science communicator and has published material about how to create bee sanctuaries. Her other areas of research include undertaking biodiversity assessments, pollination ecology, critiquing methods for surveying pollinators, native bee ecology and behaviour and citizen science. In 2019, Prendergast was named as a finalist for Young Scientist of the Year.

She discovered a new species of native bee, Leioproctus zephyr, named after her dog Zephyr. Prendergast also has a large tattoo of two bees having sex on her right shoulder. She describes the bees, Amegilla dawsoni, as her favourite bee species.

Prendergast discovered two different species of native Australian bee (Xanthesma (Xenohesma) perpulchra and Xanthesma (Xanthesma) brachycera) were actually just one.

Prendergast is also the author of Creating a Haven for Native Bees and Abuzz About Dawson's Burrowing Bee.

== Personal life ==
Outside of her scientific work, Prendergast is a circus performer. She also has an arts degree.
