= Bee hotel =

Artificial bee shelter

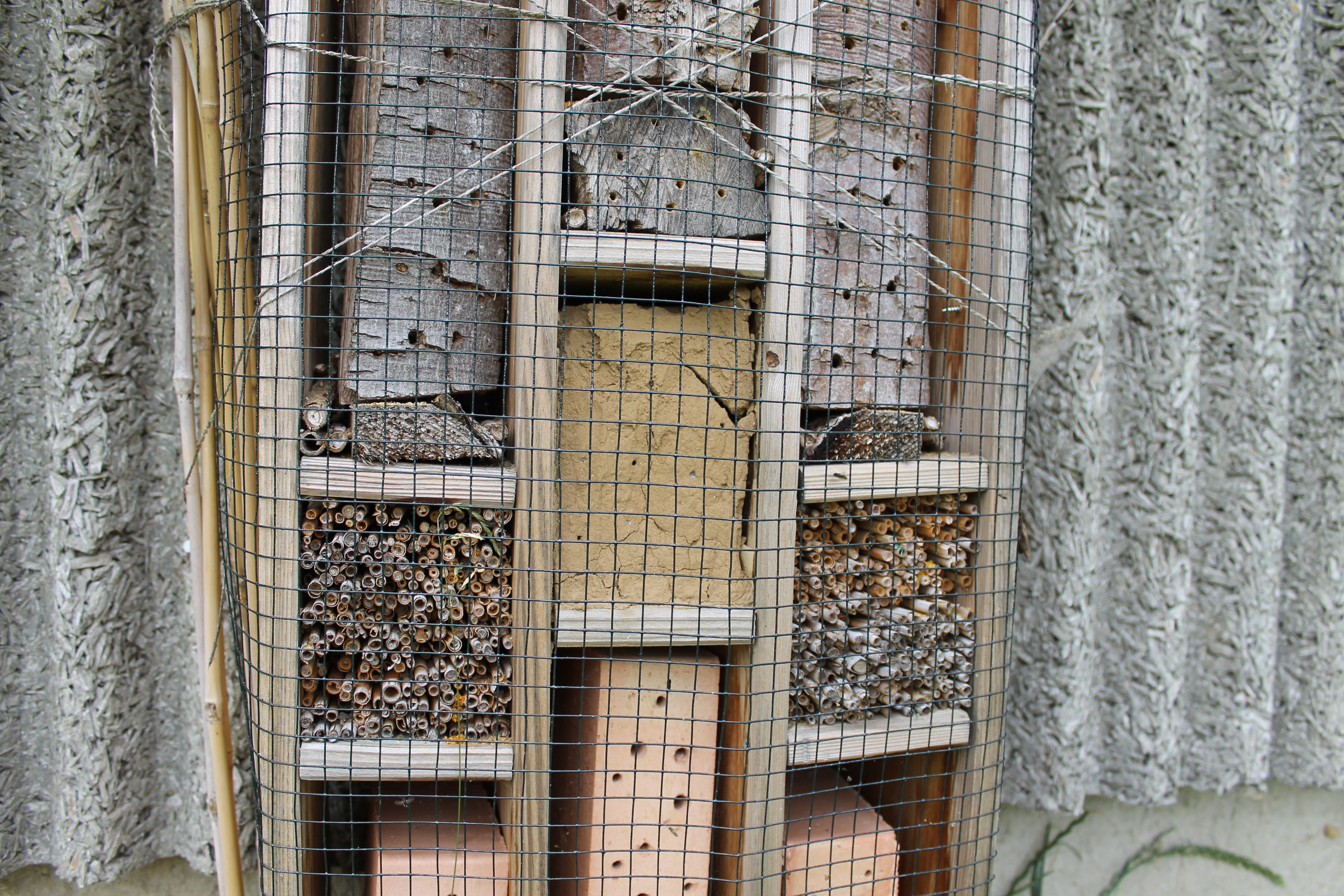
Nesting aid for wild bees

Bee hotels are a type of insect hotel for solitary pollinator bees, or wasps, providing them rest and shelter. Typically, these bees would nest in hollow plant stems, holes in dead wood, or other natural cavities; a bee hotel attempts to mimic this structure by using a bunch of hollow reeds or holes drilled in wood, among other methods. Bee hotels can possibly support native bee and wasp populations by adding nesting resources to a habitat. However, some activists have criticized bee hotels for being ineffective at rehabilitating native bee populations and possibly harming them by providing homes to invasive species and creating grounds where bees can transmit diseases to one another. Bee hotels generally only support a small proportion of bee species, as the vast majority of wild bees breed underground, e.g. sand bees, long-horned bees, silk bees, furrow bees and narrow bees.

== Beehive and bee hotel difference ==
A beehive is where bee colonies or communities live and raise; a bee hotel's purpose is to solely attract bees that do not make their homes in colonies, but instead build individual nesting sites of their own, referred to as "solitary bees".

== Construction and care ==
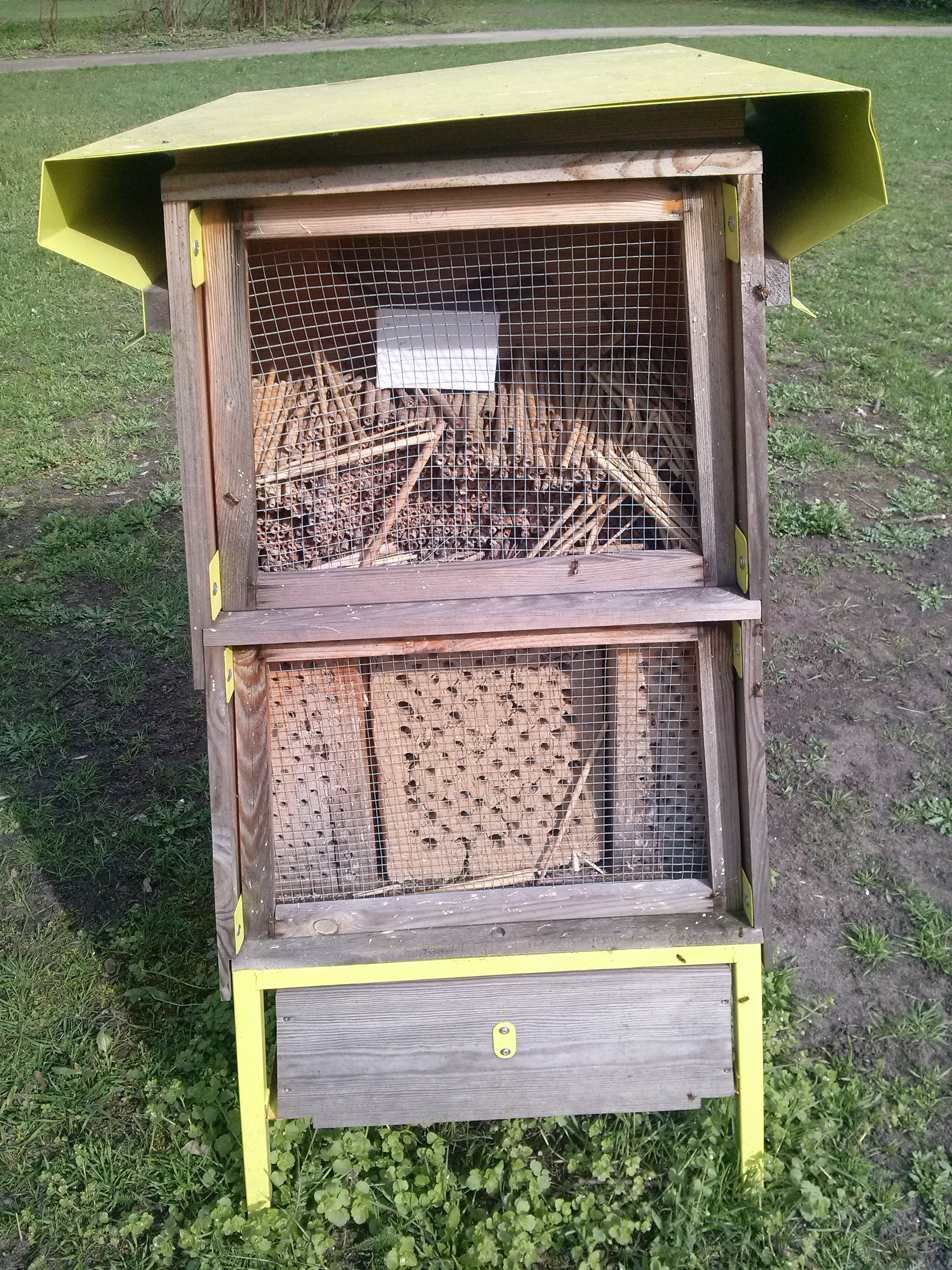
A bee hotel in Poland

Bee hotels are constructed in a manner to mimic the real life structures that solitary bees nest in. They incorporate reeds, bamboo or other materials to create a bundle of horizontal tubes, open at one end, closed at the other. These horizontal tubes range 12–20 cm in length, and 2–12 mm in diameter. Most bees require tube diameters of 5 mm and less. These nested tubes require maintenance and cleanliness as bees in hotels are more susceptible to disease, such as the spread of chalkbrood.

However, bee hotels could also provide homes to invasive species and species of wasps that predate on bees, making predation from parasitic wasps and kleptoparasites more likely than in naturally built nests.

Dead, walled-up cells from previous years should be removed. Bee cells taken over by the parasitic Cacoxenus indagator fly should also be removed to prevent spreading. Certain woods may not provide sufficient weather protection, especially in wet weather. Certain woods are also more prone to splintering inside the tunnel. In general, softwoods such as pine and spruce are unsuitable because they secrete resin and are also very soft and difficult to drill. Wood from fruit trees, beech, and oak are well suited. Drilling into the front side of the wood should be avoided, as this causes the wood fibers to absorb water and also makes them more susceptible to cracking during drying. The cracks allow moisture to penetrate and lead to fungus growth in the brood cells.

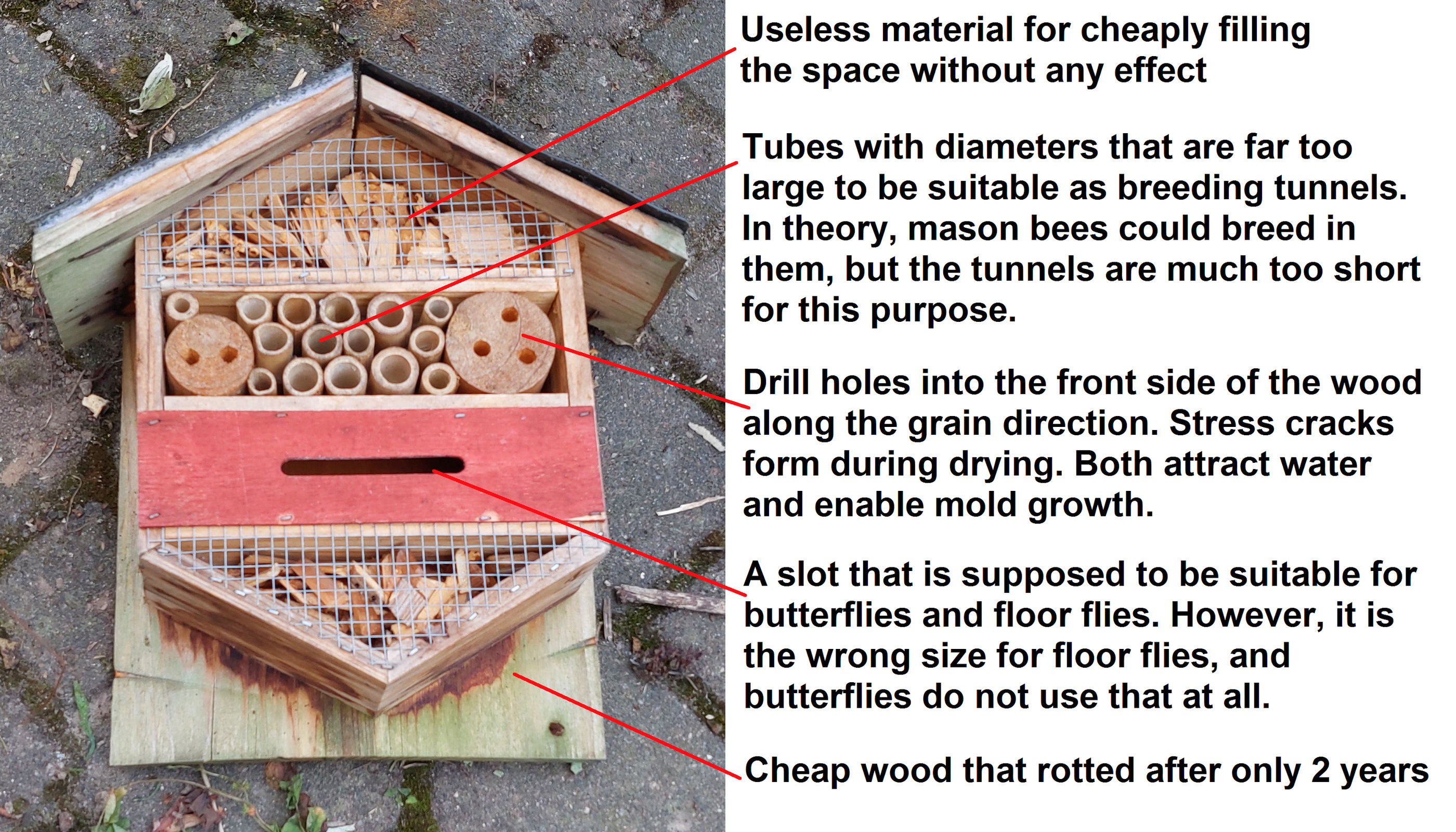
Common mistakes with bee hotels

Materials such as pine cones and wood chips are useless as filling for wild bees. They are even counterproductive, as they attract competitors for food and predators of bees, such as earwigs, beetles, and ants. In commercial nesting aids, they are usually only used as cheap filling material. Unfortunately, DIY stores and supermarkets sell precisely these types of shelters. They have tubes with completely incorrect diameters and depths, because wood waste and production leftovers are built in, that cannot be used elsewhere. Protective wire is often only used to prevent components from falling out. In fact, however, a wire mesh stretched a few inches in front of it would have to be used to deter birds from plundering the nesting tubes.

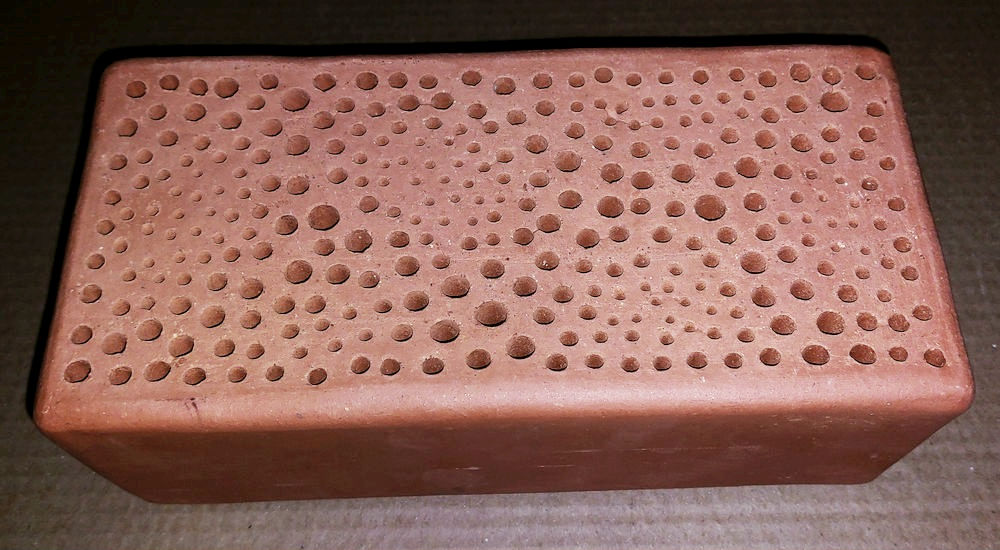
Terracotta-Bee-Nesting Aid

A very safe material is unglazed clay, which has ideally been fired in such a way that it still has open pores, allowing air to circulate. This allows the growing bee larvae to breathe and at the same time prevents mold growth. In addition, birds have no chance of accessing the brood tunnels or pulling out stalks. Parasites are also unable to burrow into the tunnels from the side. The hole sizes range from 3 mm to 8 mm and focus on the small holes, thereby promoting particularly smaller bee species, like masked bees, Heriades, Chelostoma and blue mason bee.

== Studies and use ==
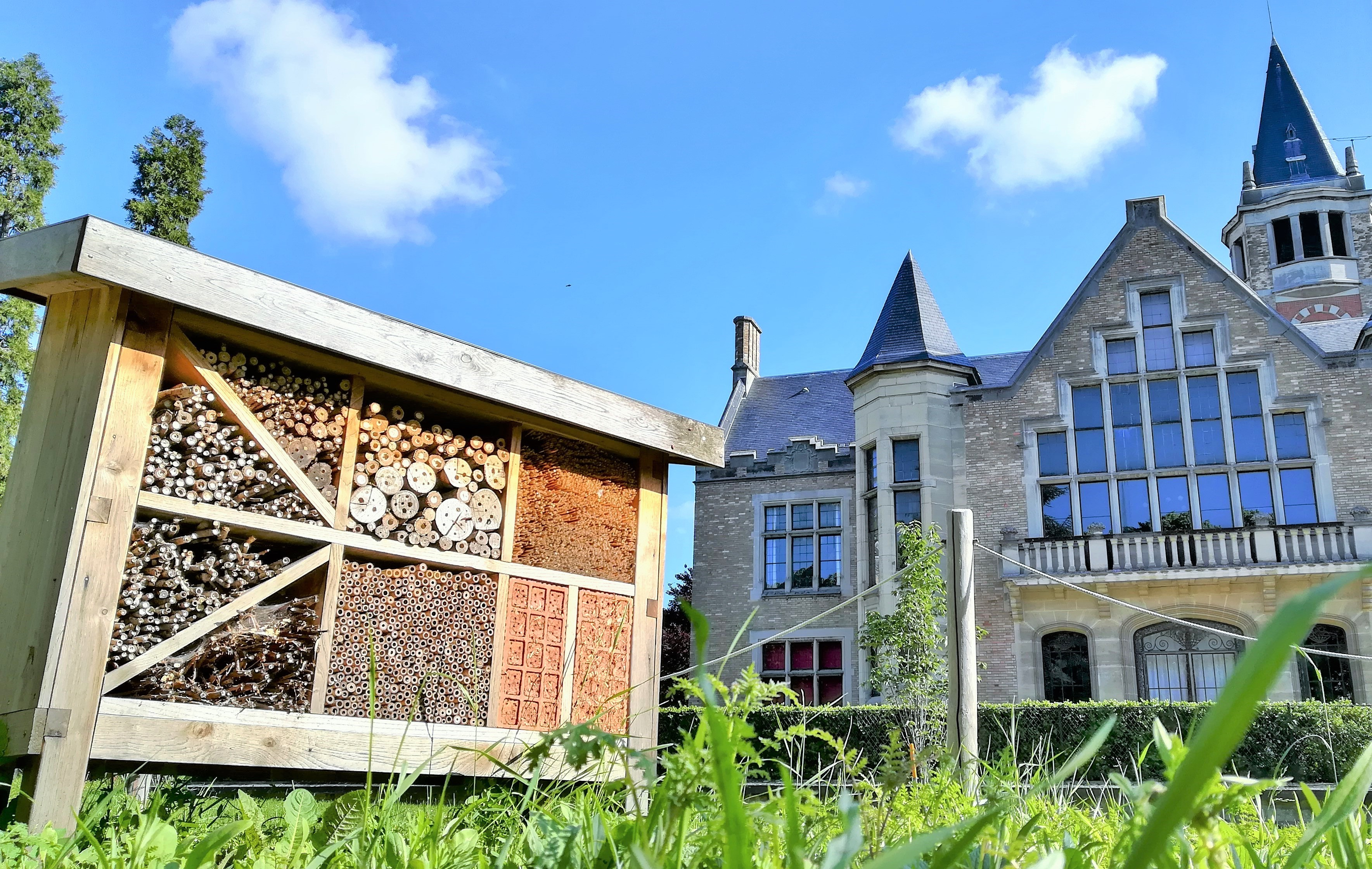
A bee hotel in Paris

Approximately 30% of the 5,000 native bee species in North America build nests in tunnels or cavities situated above ground. Regarding the wild bee species in Europe, 75% are supposed to breed underground.

The 2021 scientific publication Worldwide occurrence records suggest a global decline in bee species richness indicates a downward trend in the global bee population. In order to try and reverse the perceived reduction in bee numbers, some people construct bee hotels.

A study of 200 bee hotels undertaken by melittologist Laurence Packer and Scott MacIvor from York University indicated that 50% of bee hotels in their study were dominated by wasps. Bees, unlike wasps, favour hotels that receive direct (especially morning) sunlight, and that are closer to the ground. Bee hotels located on multi-storey building rooftops and in shaded areas are more likely to attract wasps. The study critiqued poorly designed and maintained bee hotels, noting that plastic tubes can be a catalyst for mould, short tubes can discourage female bees, and proximity of spiders can reduce bee populations. Peter Hallett, a melittologist from the University of Toronto noted that the wasps observed in the study were not yellowjackets, but solitary wasps that are generally perceived more positively in North America.

Melittologist Cory Sheffield of the Royal Saskatchewan Museum observed more positive trends in bee hotels used by bees in orchards in Nova Scotia and noted that some of the problems from the Toronto study were unique to cities. Both Cory Sheffield and Laurence Packer encouraged creation of bee hotels, despite the issues identified in the Toronto study. A Canadian study of 200 bee hotels in Toronto indicated that 50% of hotels were dominated by wasps, 25% by invasive, and 25% by natives.
