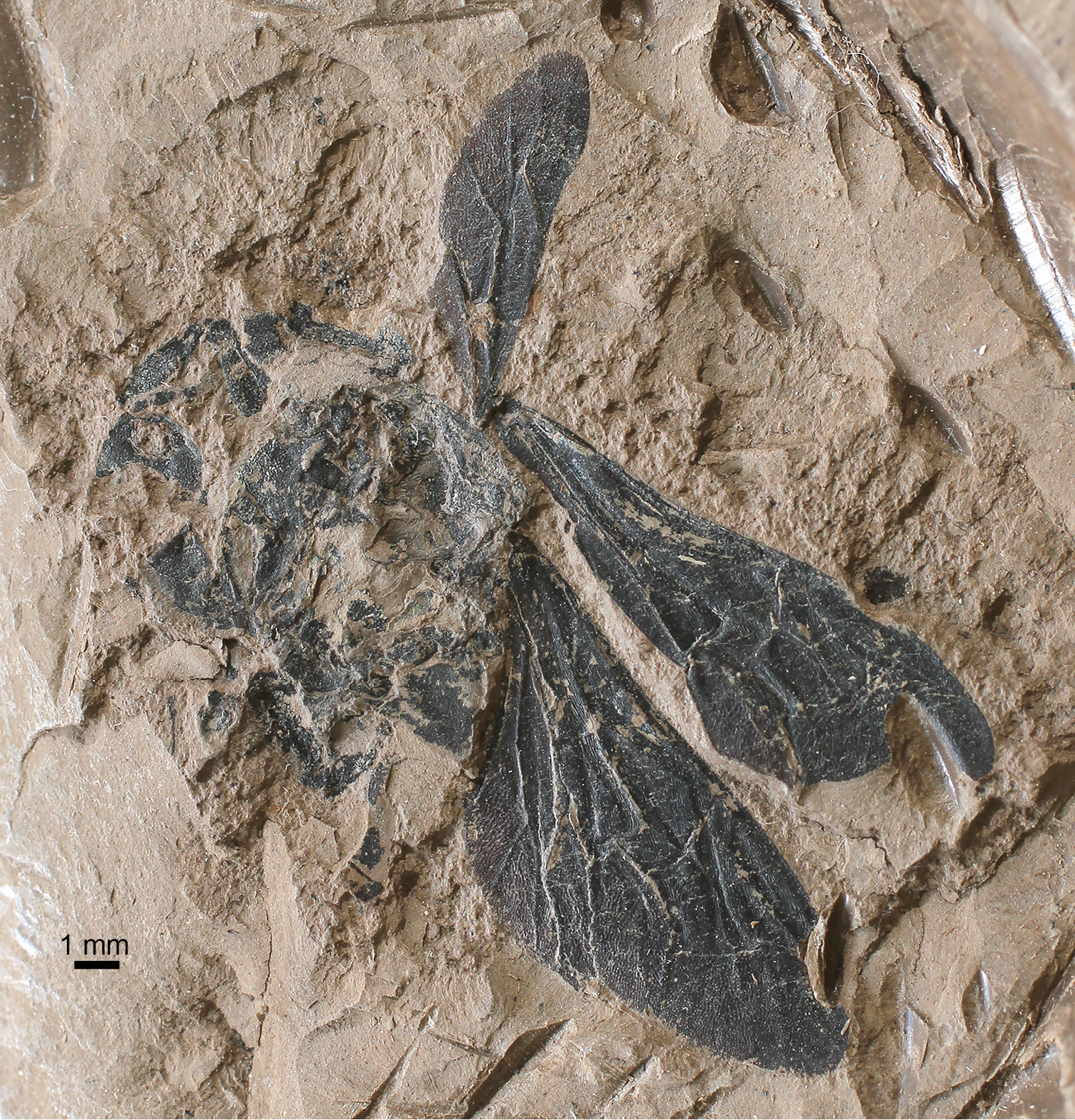
- Holotype

Scientific classification
- Domain: Eukaryota
- Kingdom: Animalia
- Phylum: Arthropoda
- Class: Insecta
- Order: Hymenoptera
- Family: Apidae
- Genus: Bombus
- Subgenus: Cullumanobombus
- Species: †B. trophonius

Binomial name
- †Bombus trophonius Prokop, Dehon, Michez, & Engel, 2017

= Bombus trophonius =

Bombus trophonius Temporal range: Burdigalian

Extinct species of bee

Bombus trophonius is an extinct species of bumble bee known from a Miocene fossil found in Europe. It belongs to the Bombus subgenus Cullumanobombus and is considered most similar to the living species Bombus rufocinctus of North America.

== History and classification ==
Bombus trophonius is known from a single bumble bee found in the Czech Republic. The specimen was described from a compression fossil preserved in lignite deposits of the Most Basin. The site is exposed in workings of the Bílina Mine, an opencast lignite mine in Bílina, Bohemia, Czech Republic. The mine exposes an approximately 150 m (490 ft) thick sequence of deposits recording the progression of a delta lake and bog ecosystem. Fossils of eleven different insect orders are recorded in the Bílina site, representing members of 31 different insect families, with formicids being the most common insects, being nearly 40% of the specimens collected. Over the lifetime of the lake, the Bílina area was a delta region of a large drainage system emptying into a shallow 5 km (3.1 mi) lake, with expansive peat bogs surrounding it. There are several different fish and at least one frog from the genus Rana also known from the Bílina mine area that may have fed on the ants that fell into the lake. The low bog forest where B. trophonius lived had a mix of temperate plants such as alders, oaks and swamp cypress along with more tropical plants such as climbing fern, palmetto and rattan palms. The primary insect-bearing layers of the formation belong to the Holešice Member which has been dated as Burdigalian in age, placing it in the Early Miocene.

The fossil was studied by a team of paleoentomologists led by Jakub Prokop, with the group's 2017 type description of the new species being published in the journal ZooKeys. The specific epithet trophonius was picked as a reference to the Greek hero Trophonius, due to his association with both the underworld and to bees.

Due to the lack of discernible head and body characters placement of the fossil was based on morphometric analysis of the wings. A series of three morphometric analysis groups were used to narrow down the placement of the fossil within the superfamily Apoidea. A broad data set with 979 female specimens and covering 18 subfamilies was used first to determine the family placement of the fossil, narrowing down to Apidae. The second data set included females from five different Apidae tribes Ancylaini, Bombini, Emphorini, Euglossini, Tarsaliini, and Tetrapediini that showed the fossil to be a member of the tribe Bombini. A final modified dataset of 841 specimens was used that included 100% of the Bombus subgenus diversity and at 210 species, over 80% of the living species. Based on the forewing morphology the fossil was grouped in Bombus subgenus Cullumanobombus, but the dataset did not give clear indication if the fossil was a stem-group or a crown group species. The vein patterning, and cell shapes and sizes are most similar to the extant species Bombus (Cullumanobombus) rufocinctus, the "red-belted bumblebee", which is native to much of the Nearctic. The two species are distinguished from each other based on the pterostigma and marginal cell shapes and the curvature of the 2rs-m vein. If the fossil is considered a stem-group species, then the wing venation may be symplesiomorphic with that of B. rufocinctus which is basal within B. subgenus Cullumanobombus.

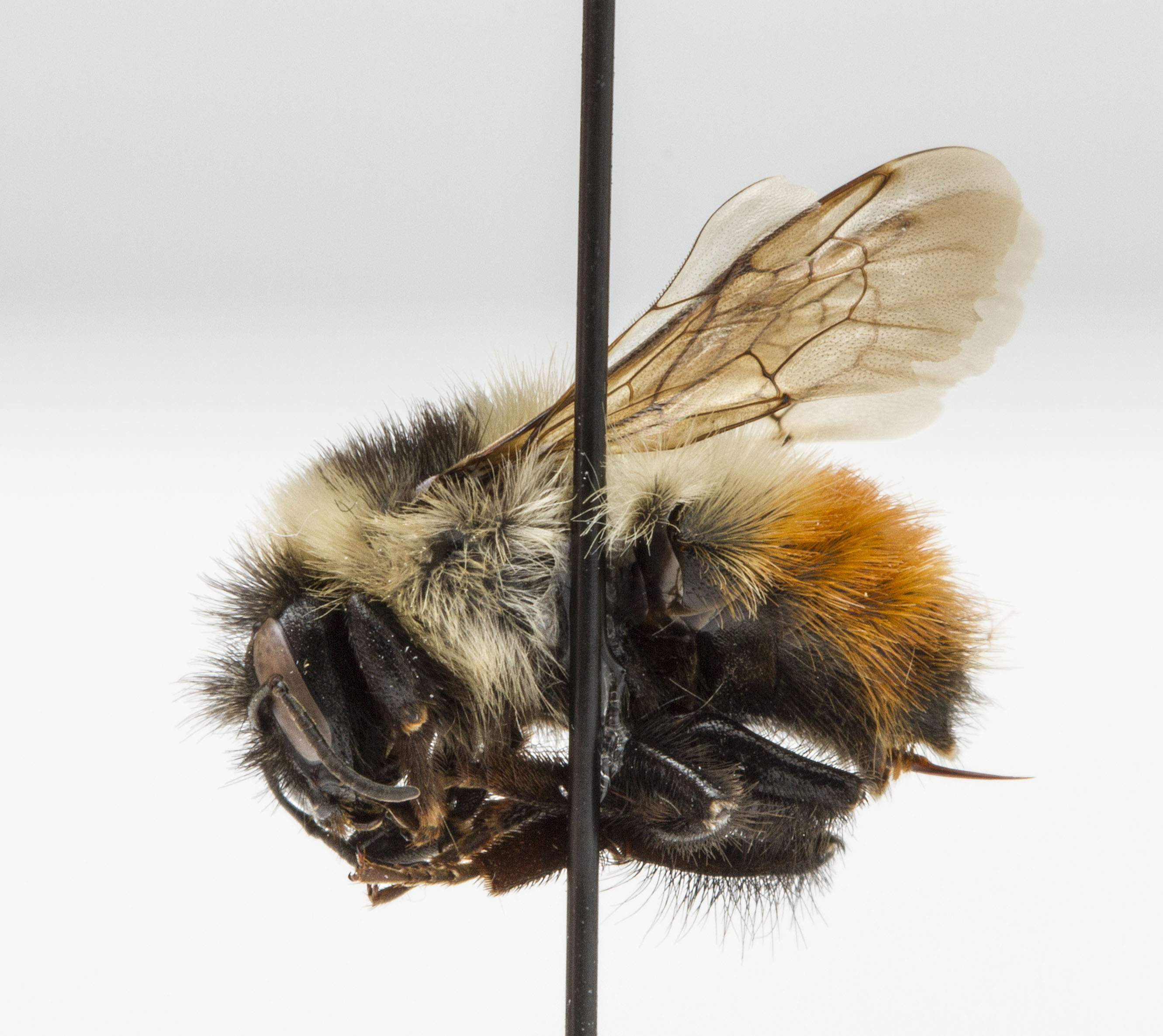
Bombus rufocinctus

== Description ==
The body of the holotype is very incomplete, with only a little of the metatibial corbicula present, and sections of the thorax which have long setae preserved. What is present of the legs, wings and thorax are all black in coloration due to the preservation conditions of the strata, and so the bee's coloration in life is unknown. The single hind wing preserved fully is 9.4 mm (0.4 in) long and 2.6 mm (0.1 in) wide. The forewings are larger with a length of 14.6 mm (0.6 in) and a width of 5.10 mm (0.2 in) at the widest. The pterostigma is rectangular and a little longer than wide with an outwardly bowed edge with the marginal cell. The prestigma, the Radial vein section between the 1Rs vein and the pterostigma, is almost as long as the pterostigma itself. The marginal cell is larger than the pterostigma at 1.1 mm (0.0 in) wide and 5.1 mm (0.2 in) long. It narrows slightly across its length and the apical end of the cell, which is narrower than the basal end, is almost as long as the basal end that is bordered by submarginal cells. The apical margin of the cell is rounded and pulls away from the marginal wing vein by more than a vein width.
