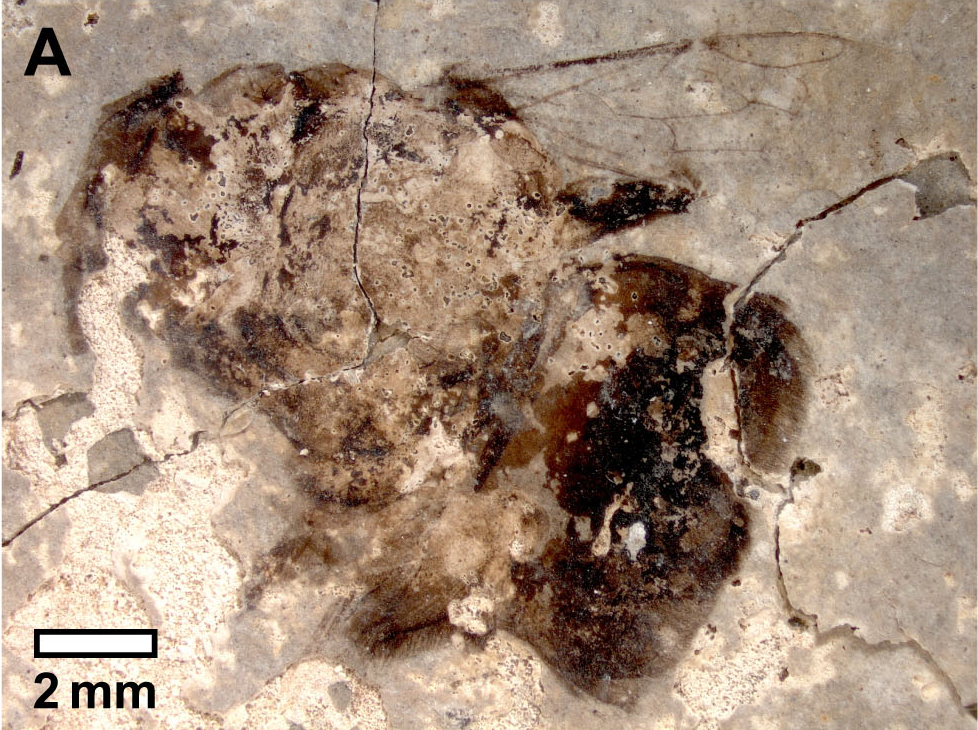
- P. pauli holotype

Scientific classification
- Kingdom: Animalia
- Phylum: Arthropoda
- Clade: Pancrustacea
- Class: Insecta
- Order: Hymenoptera
- Family: Apidae
- Genus: †Protohabropoda; Dehon & Engel, 2014
- Species: †P. pauli

Binomial name
- †Protohabropoda pauli De Meulemeester & Michez, 2014

= Protohabropoda =

Protohabropoda Temporal range: Late Oligocene

Extinct genus of bees

Protohabropoda is an extinct genus of bees in the family Apidae known from a fossil found in Europe. The genus currently contains a single described species Protohabropoda pauli.

== History and classification ==
P. pauli was described from a solitary fossil, which is a compression-impression fossil pair preserved in layers of soft sedimentary rock. Along with other well preserved insect fossils, the P. pauli specimen was collected from layers of Late Oligocene lacustrine rock belonging to the "calcaire de Campagne Calavon" sediments. The material is exposed along the northern slopes of the Luberon mountains near Céreste in Southern France. The sediments are reported as from a shallow paleolake that was formerly considered about 30 million years old and Rupelian in age. Recent restudy of formation suggests the older Late Oligocene age. The paleoflora preserved in the shales suggest the lake was surrounded by a mixed-mesophytic forest though the vertebrate fauna found in the formation is more typical of a semi-arid environment. Specimens from the Apoidea families are rather rare and not diverse, with Apis specimens being the most common.

At the time of study, the holotype counterpart and part were part of the paleoentomology collections housed by the Museum National d’Histoire Naturelle. It was first studied by an international team of researchers headed by Manuel Dehon of the University of Mons, Belgium, and the team's 2014 type description of the species was published in the natural sciences journal PLOS ONE. The genus name is a combination of the Greek word "protos" meaning first and the genus Habropoda of which Protohabropoda is most similar. The specific epithet pauli is a patronym coined in honor of Paul Léon Victor Vigot, a young bee systematics enthusiast.

The size and shape of the pterostigma are similar to those of the Apinae tribes Anthophorini and Centridini though the rounded shape of the wing and the sizes of the cells formed by the wing veins make it closer to Anthophorini. In the tribe, P. pauli is identified from the living genera Anthophora and Amegilla by the positioning of veins and cells. and the genus Habropoda is distinguished by vein length.

P. pauli is one of four bee species described by Dehon and team in the PLOS ONE article, the others being Andrena antoinei, Bombus cerdanyensis, and Euglossopteryx biesmeijeri.

== Description ==
The P. pauli fossil is a female preserved with a dorsal view of the body, head twisted upward showing the face, the right forewing outstretched, and hindwings missing. The overall body length is not determinable due to positioning of the body and the twisting of the head although the mesosoma is 5.88 mm (0.231 in). The incompletely preserved antennae are not distinct enough to determine flagellomere numbers or lengths. The metasoma is 4.5 mm (0.18 in) long in side view, and the two sections that are distinctly preserved show a dense coating of hairs. The legs are not well preserved, being partly covered by the body segments though the areas that are visible show a dense coating of setae. The 7.79 mm (0.307 in) long forewings have a one marginal cell and three cells below that called the submarginal cells. The marginal cell has very little tapering near the apical end, which is distinctly rounded. The second and third submarginal cells together are longer than the first submarginal cell, which is the longest of the three cells. The pterostigma is present, with parallel sides and, like the marginal cell, no narrowing of the width.
