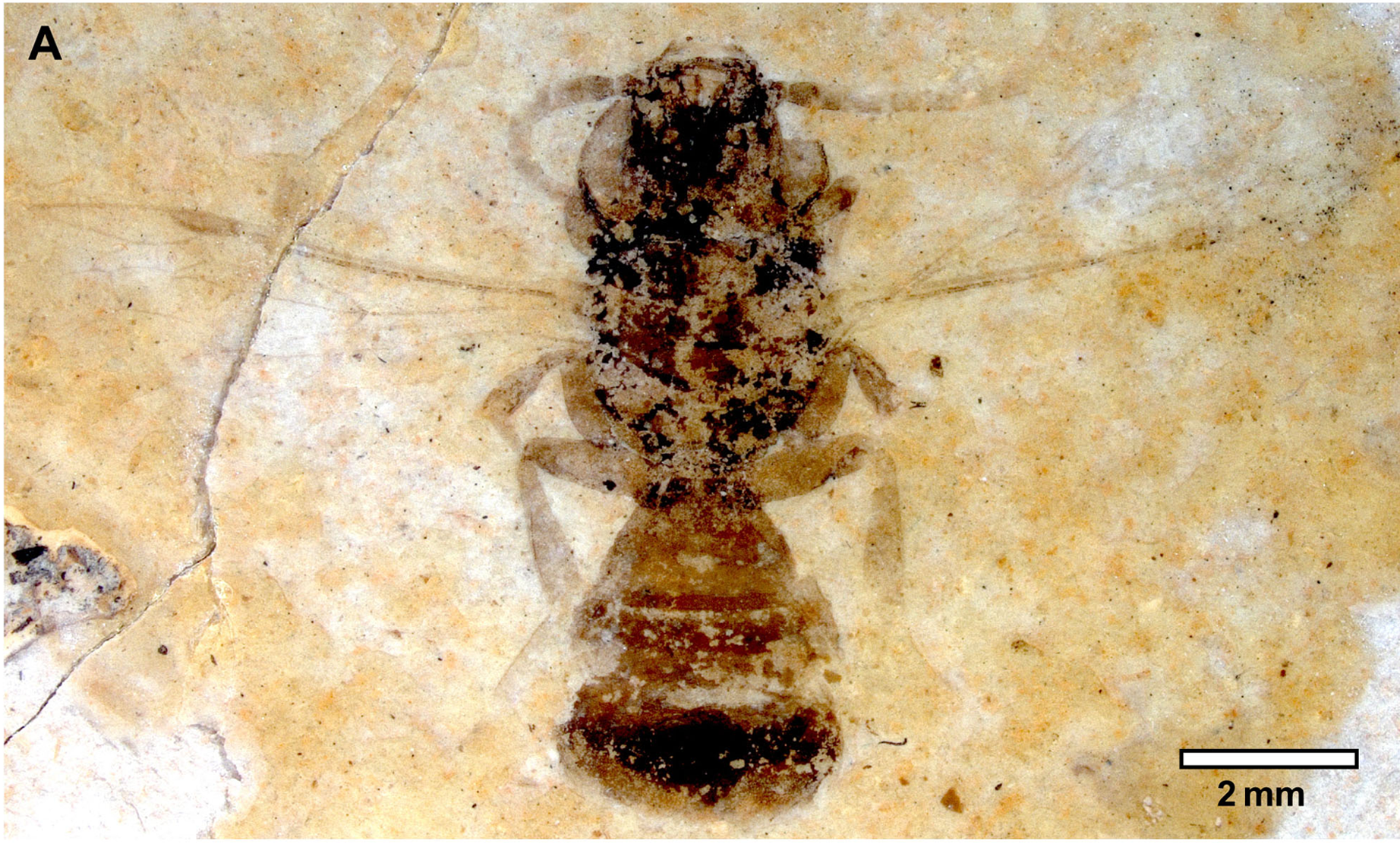
- A. antoinei holotype

Scientific classification
- Kingdom: Animalia
- Phylum: Arthropoda
- Clade: Pancrustacea
- Class: Insecta
- Order: Hymenoptera
- Family: Andrenidae
- Genus: Andrena
- Species: †A. antoinei

Binomial name
- †Andrena antoinei Michez & De Meulemeester, 2014

= Andrena antoinei =

Andrena antoinei Temporal range: Late Oligocene

Extinct species of bee

Andrena antoinei is an extinct species of mining bee in the family Andrenidae described from a single fossil found in a Late Oligocene lake in present-day France that existed in semi-arid conditions.

== History and classification ==
A. antoinei was described from a solitary fossil, which is a compression-impression fossil pair preserved in layers of soft sedimentary rock. Along with other well preserved insect fossils, the A. antoinei specimen was collected from layers of Late Oligocene lacustrine rock belonging to the "calcaire de Campagne Calavon" sediments. The material is exposed along the northern slopes of the Luberon mountains near Céreste in southern France. The sediments are reported as from a shallow paleolake that was formerly considered about 30 million year old and Rupelian in age. Recent restudy of formation has suggested the older Late Oligocene age. The paleoflora preserved in the shales suggest the lake was surrounded by a mixed-mesophytic forest, though the vertebrate fauna found in the formation is more typical of a semi-arid environment. Specimens from the Apoidea families are rather rare and not diverse, with Apis specimens being the most common.

At the time of study, the holotype counterpart and part were part of the paleoentomology collections housed by the Museum National d’Histoire Naturelle. It was first studied by an international team of researchers headed by Manuel Dehon of the University of Mons, Belgium, with the team's 2014 type description of the species was published in the natural sciences journal PLOS ONE. The specific epithet antoinei is a patronym coined in honor of Antoine Michez, for the support he provided melittology.

A morphometric analysis of the wings indicates placement into the bee family Andrenidae, though specific features of the family, such as two sulci under the antenna and pointed glossa in the mouth parts are not visible in the fossil. The size and shape of the wing cells places the species into the subfamily Andreninae and excludes placement into any of the other subfamilies. Given a lack of any features that would indicate placement into a different genus, the species was placed into Andrena until further specimens are recovered.

A. antoinei is one of four bee species described by Dehon and team in the PLOS ONE article, the others being Bombus cerdanyensis, Euglossopteryx biesmeijeri, and Protohabropoda pauli.

== Description ==
The A. antoinei fossil is a male preserved with a dorsal view of the body, head tilted upward showing the face, the antennae are laid out sideways from the head and the wings are similarly splayed out from the body. The head is 2.56 mm (0.101 in), the mesosoma is 2.9 mm (0.11 in), and the preserved section of the metasoma is 4.47 mm (0.176 in) long though only the basal two segments are preserved. The head and body coloration is a mix of black, yellow and brown tones. Brown tones are preserved on the wing veins, antennae and metasoma. Black tones are present on the mesosoma, tip segments of the metasoma, and most of the head. The head shows a distinct yellow tone on the clypeus. The antennae are not completely preserved for determining flagellomere numbers, the right having seven and the left having six. The 5.94 mm (0.234 in) long hyaline forewings have a one marginal cell and three cells below that called the submarginal cells. The marginal cell has a distinct tapering in width from the base to the apical end, which is distinctly rounded. The second and third submarginal cells together are slightly shorter than the first submarginal cell, which is the longest of the three cells. The pterostigma is present, with a darkened tone, and it more than three times longer than its maximum width.
