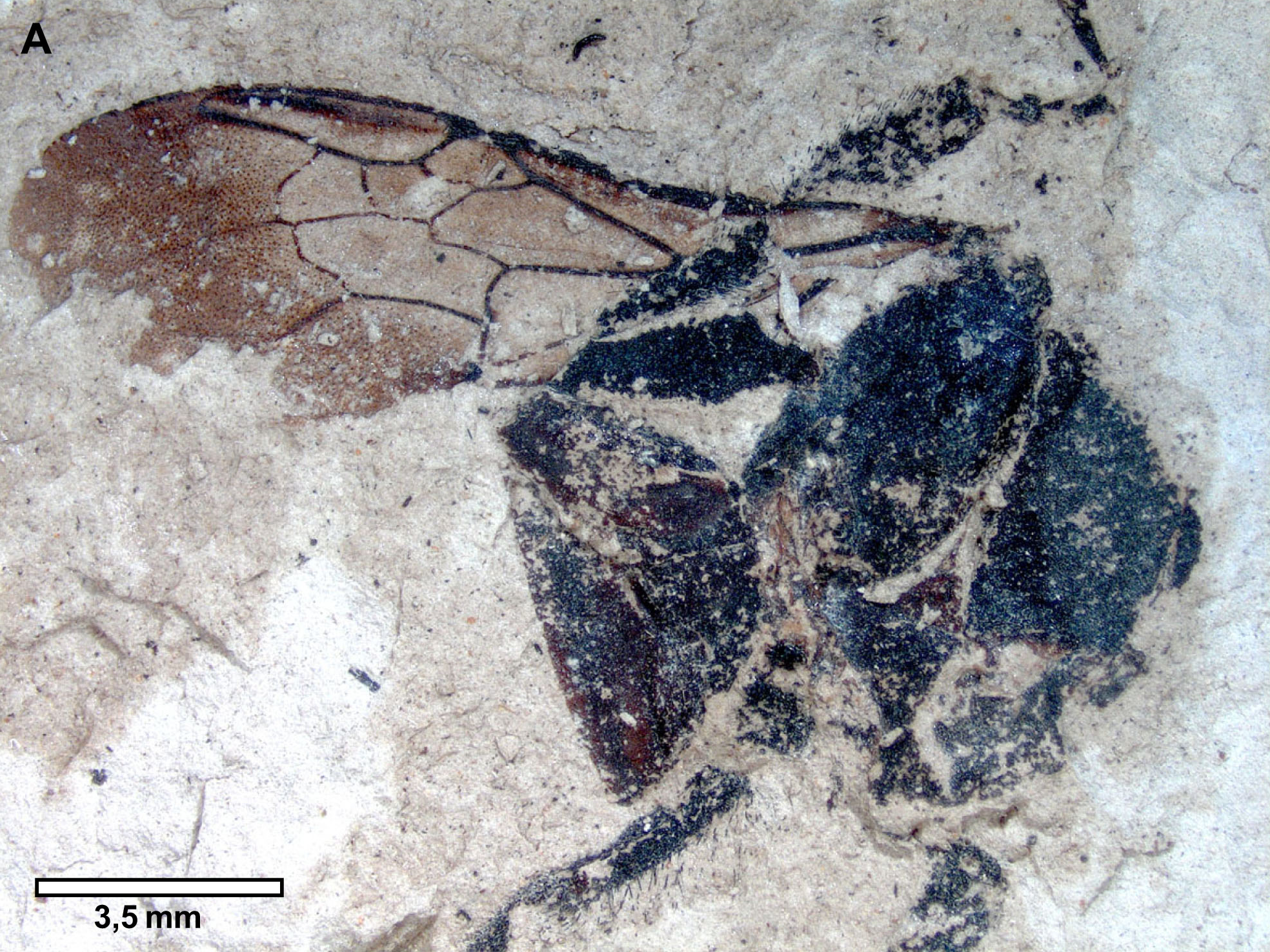
- B. cerdanyensis holotype

Scientific classification
- Kingdom: Animalia
- Phylum: Arthropoda
- Clade: Pancrustacea
- Class: Insecta
- Order: Hymenoptera
- Family: Apidae
- Genus: Bombus; Dehon & Engel, 2014
- Species: †B. cerdanyensis

Binomial name
- †Bombus cerdanyensis De Meulemeester, Michez, & Engel, 2014

= Bombus cerdanyensis =

Bombus cerdanyensis Temporal range: Late Miocene

Extinct species of bee

Bombus cerdanyensis is an extinct species of bumble bee in the family Apidae known from a fossil found in Europe.

== History and classification ==
Bombus cerdanyensis was described from a solitary fossil, which is a compression-impression fossil pair preserved in layers of soft sedimentary rock. Along with other well preserved insect fossils, the B. cerdanyensis specimen was collected from layers of Late Miocene terrigenous and diatomites exposed around the small town of Bellver de Cerdanya, Spain. The sediments are reported as from a deep mountain paleolake that exists about 10 million years ago. Study of the paleoflora preserved in the shales indicates the lake was around 1,100 metres (3,600 ft) in elevation in a climate that was warmer than the current conditions in the area.

At the time of study, the holotype counterpart and part were part of the paleoentomology collections housed by the Museum National d’Histoire Naturelle. It was first studied by an international team of researchers headed by Manuel Dehon of the University of Mons, Belgium, with the teams 2014 type description of the species was published in the natural sciences journal PLOS ONE. The specific epithet cerdanyensis was coined as reference to the type locality of the Cerdanya region Spain.

Linear discriminant analyses of the body and wing structuring indicated a relationship to members of the bee clade Corbiculata, which encompasses the living tribes Apini, Bombini, Euglossini, Meliponini and the extinct tribes Melikertini, Electrapini, and Electrobombini. Within Corbiculata, Apini has a distinct wing marginal cell and Meliponini has very reduced wing venation, neither features seen in B. cerdanyensis. The overall sizes of both pterostigma and prestigma are different than seen in members of Electrobombini, while the apical area is papillate, showing small bumps, as seen in Bombini.

B. cerdanyensis is one of four bee species described by Dehon and team in the PLOS ONE article, the others being Andrena antoinei, Euglossopteryx biesmeijeri, and Protohabropoda pauli.

== Description ==
The B. cerdanyensis fossil is an adult preserved with a dorsal view of the body, outstretched left forewing, and missing its head, hindwings, right forewing. The forewing is 13.25 mm (0.522 in) long has one marginal cell and three cells below, called the submarginal cells. The marginal cell had a closed tip end that is notably rounded and it is longer than the distance between the wing tip and the apex of the cell. Over the length of the cell it tapers down in width, being widest near the basal end and narrowest at the apical end. The submarginal cells are placed along the lower basal margin of the marginal cell, and are all nearly the same size. A pterostigma is present being small in trapezohedral. The apical area of the wing is darkened notably and has a distinct papillate texture.
