= Nanorhathymus =

Scientific classification
- Domain: Eukaryota
- Kingdom: Animalia
- Phylum: Arthropoda
- Class: Insecta
- Order: Hymenoptera
- Family: Apidae
- Subfamily: Apinae
- Tribe: Rhathymini
- Genus: Nanorhathymus; Engel, Michener & Rightmyer, 2004

Genus of bees

Nanorhathymus is a genus of cuckoo bees belonging to the tribe Rhathymini.

Species of this genus have been founded throughout Central and Eastern South America, up to Mexico.

== Species ==
- Nanorhathymus bertonii (Schrottky, 1920)
- Nanorhathymus acutiventris (Friese, 1906)
