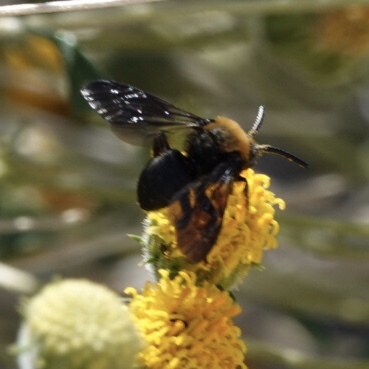

Scientific classification
- Kingdom: Animalia
- Phylum: Arthropoda
- Class: Insecta
- Order: Hymenoptera
- Family: Apidae
- Tribe: Melectini
- Genus: Brachymelecta
- Species: B. larreae

Binomial name
- Brachymelecta larreae (Cockerell, 1900)

= Brachymelecta larreae =

Species of bee

Brachymelecta larreae is a species of cuckoo bee in the family Apidae. It is found in Central America and North America.
