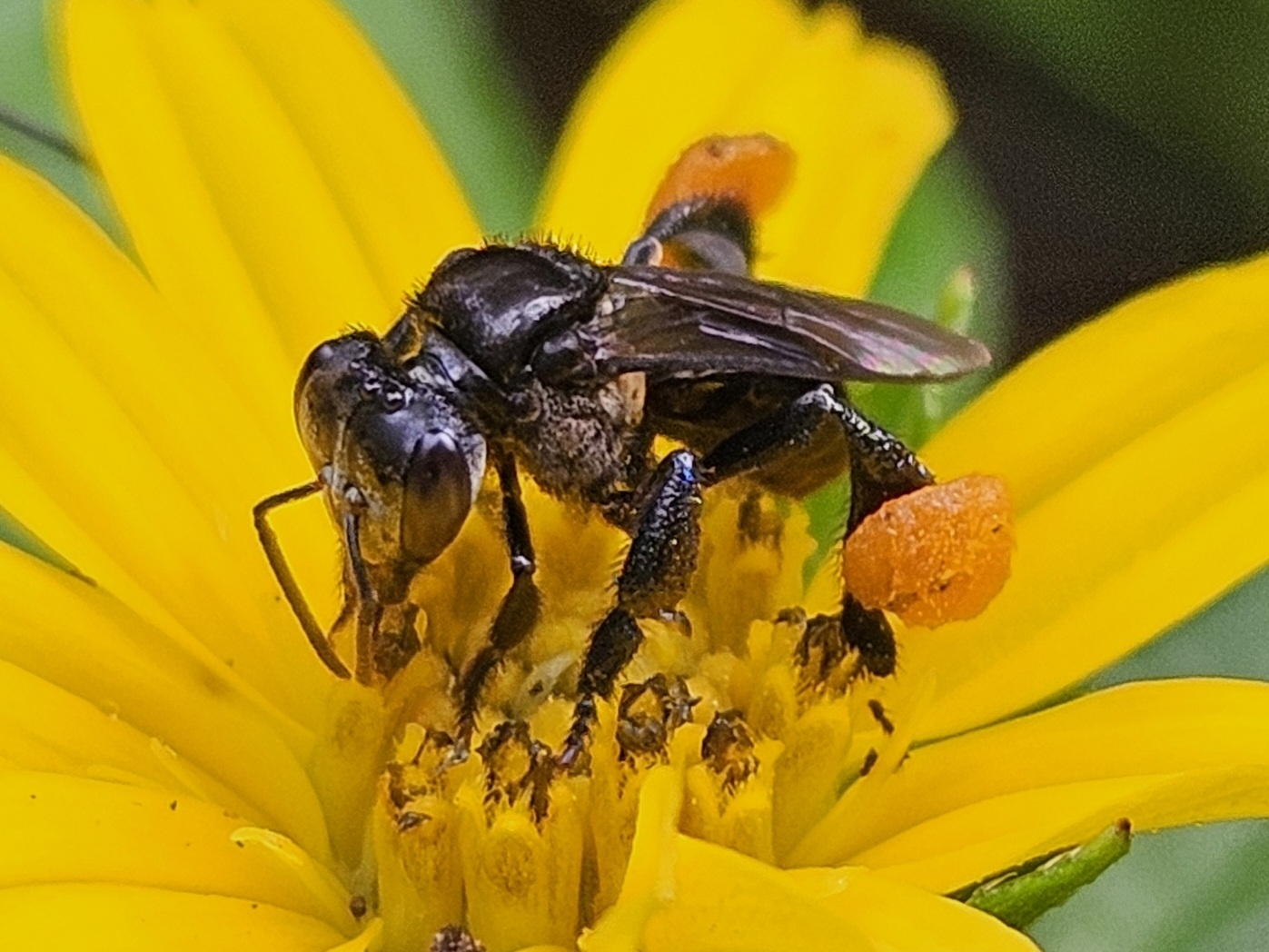
- Heterotrigona itama

Scientific classification
- Kingdom: Animalia
- Phylum: Arthropoda
- Clade: Pancrustacea
- Class: Insecta
- Order: Hymenoptera
- Family: Apidae
- Clade: Corbiculata
- Tribe: Meliponini
- Genus: Heterotrigona; Schwarz, 1939

= Heterotrigona =

Genus of stingless bees

Heterotrigona is a genus of stingless bees in the tribe Meliponini (family Apidae), native to Southeast Asia and adjacent regions.

The genus was described by Schwarz in 1939. It comprises small to medium-sized species, morphologically close to the genus Homotrigona, but generally smaller and with reduced mandibles.

Species of Heterotrigona are distributed mainly across South and Southeast Asia, including Malaysia, Thailand, Indonesia, Singapore, Borneo and the Philippines, extending to Papua New Guinea. They are eusocial bees that nest in tree cavities or artificial structures and are widely used in meliponiculture for the production of honey, propolis, and as agricultural pollinators.

The most well-known and economically important species is Heterotrigona itama (Cockerell, 1918), a predominantly black species widely managed in commercial colonies across Southeast Asia.

Approximately 15 species are currently recognized.

== Species ==
- Heterotrigona atricornis
- Heterotrigona bakeri
- Heterotrigona erythrogastra
- Heterotrigona flaviventris
- Heterotrigona hobbyi
- Heterotrigona itama
- Heterotrigona keyensis
- Heterotrigona lamingtonia
- Heterotrigona lieftincki
- Heterotrigona moorei
- Heterotrigona paradisaea
- Heterotrigona planifrons
- Heterotrigona taraxis
- Heterotrigona tricholoma
