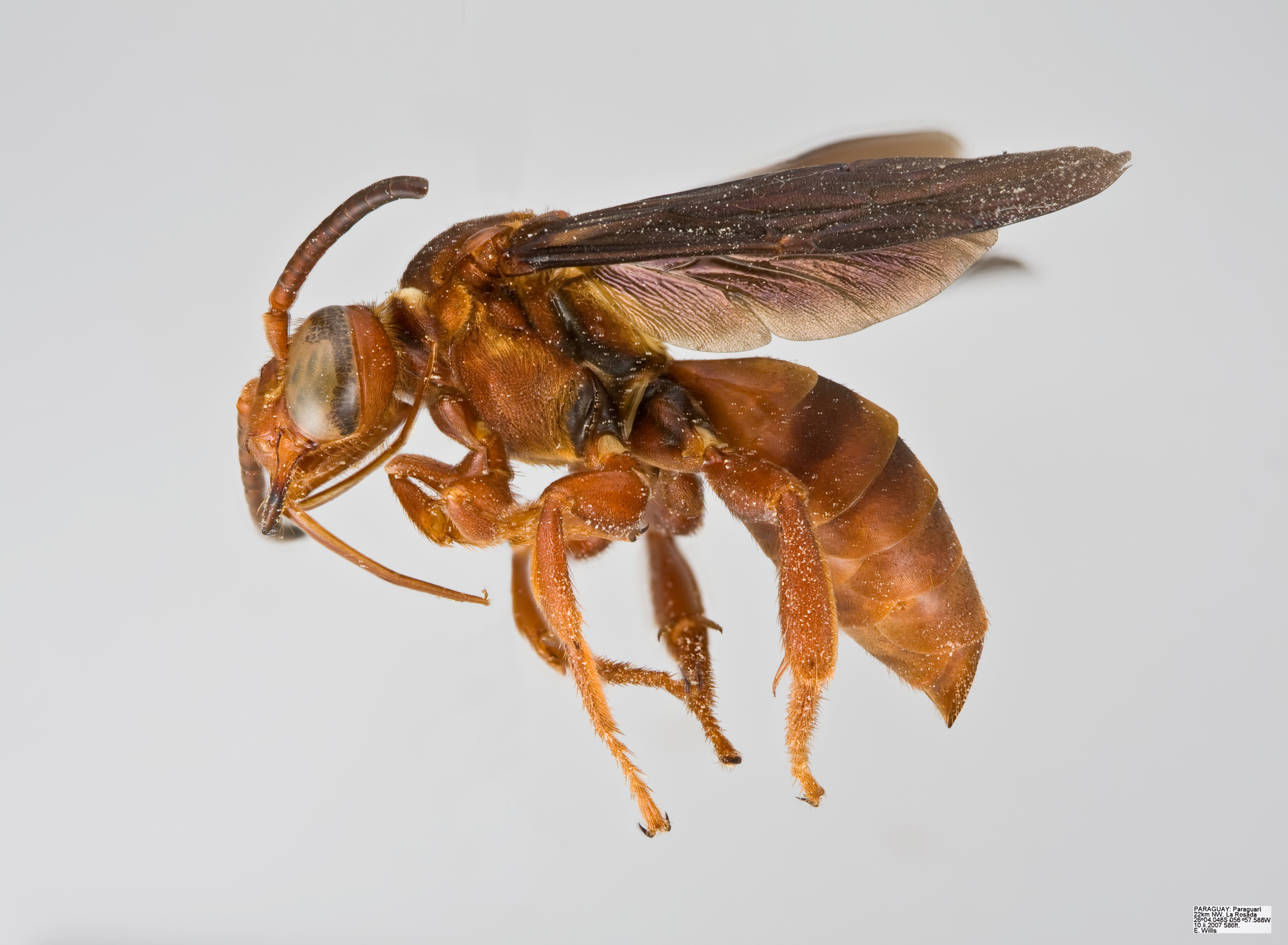
- Rhathymus sp. (female)

Scientific classification
- Kingdom: Animalia
- Phylum: Arthropoda
- Clade: Pancrustacea
- Class: Insecta
- Order: Hymenoptera
- Family: Apidae
- Subfamily: Apinae
- Tribe: Rhathymini; Lepeletier, 1841

= Rhathymini =

Tribe of bees

The Rhathymini are a tribe of kleptoparasitic apid bees ("cuckoo bees").

== Description ==
The Rhathymini consists of bees typically moderate to large in size, ranging 13–28 mm (0.51–1.10 in) body length.

Visually, scholars have compared their appearance to that of vespid wasps (especially Polistes), or the giant species of the bee genus Nomada.

== Behavior ==
As a kleptoparasitic species, the Rhathymini forego the typical pollination process common amongst bee species to feed their offspring, and instead lay their eggs within the nests already provisioned by other bee species.

Rhathymini have been documented to display aggression toward other bee ecosystems, including documented instances of attacking the nests of other bees.

== Genera ==
- Nanorhathymus
- Rhathymus
