= Ancyloscelidini =

Scientific classification
- Kingdom: Animalia
- Phylum: Arthropoda
- Clade: Pancrustacea
- Class: Insecta
- Order: Hymenoptera
- Family: Apidae
- Subfamily: Apinae
- Tribe: Ancyloscelidini; Roig-Alsina & Michener, 1993

Synonyms
- Teratognathini Silveira, 1995

Tribe of bees

The Ancyloscelidini are a tribe of bees in the family Apidae.

== Genera ==
- Ancyloscelis
- Chilimalopsis
- Eremapis
- Teratognatha
