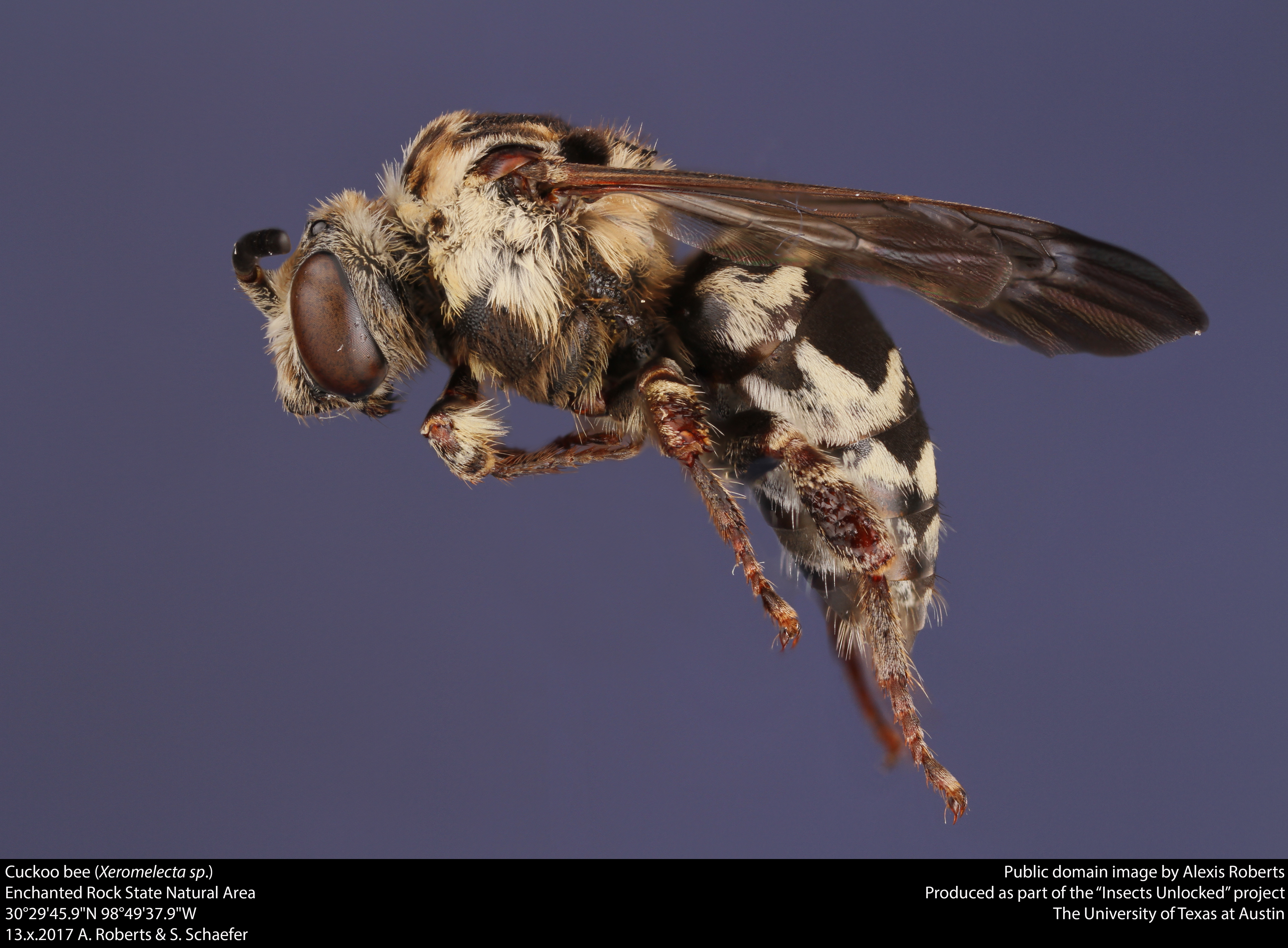

Scientific classification
- Domain: Eukaryota
- Kingdom: Animalia
- Phylum: Arthropoda
- Class: Insecta
- Order: Hymenoptera
- Family: Apidae
- Subfamily: Apinae
- Tribe: Melectini
- Genus: Brachymelecta; Linsley, 1939

= Brachymelecta =

Genus of bees

Brachymelecta is a genus of cuckoo bees in the family Apidae, formerly (until 2021) known by the name Xeromelecta.

== Species ==
- Brachymelecta alayoi Michener, 1988
- Brachymelecta californica (Cresson, 1878)
- Brachymelecta haitensis (Michener, 1948)
- Brachymelecta interrupta (Cresson, 1872)
- Brachymelecta larreae (Cockerell, 1900)
- Brachymelecta tibialis (Fabricius, 1793)
