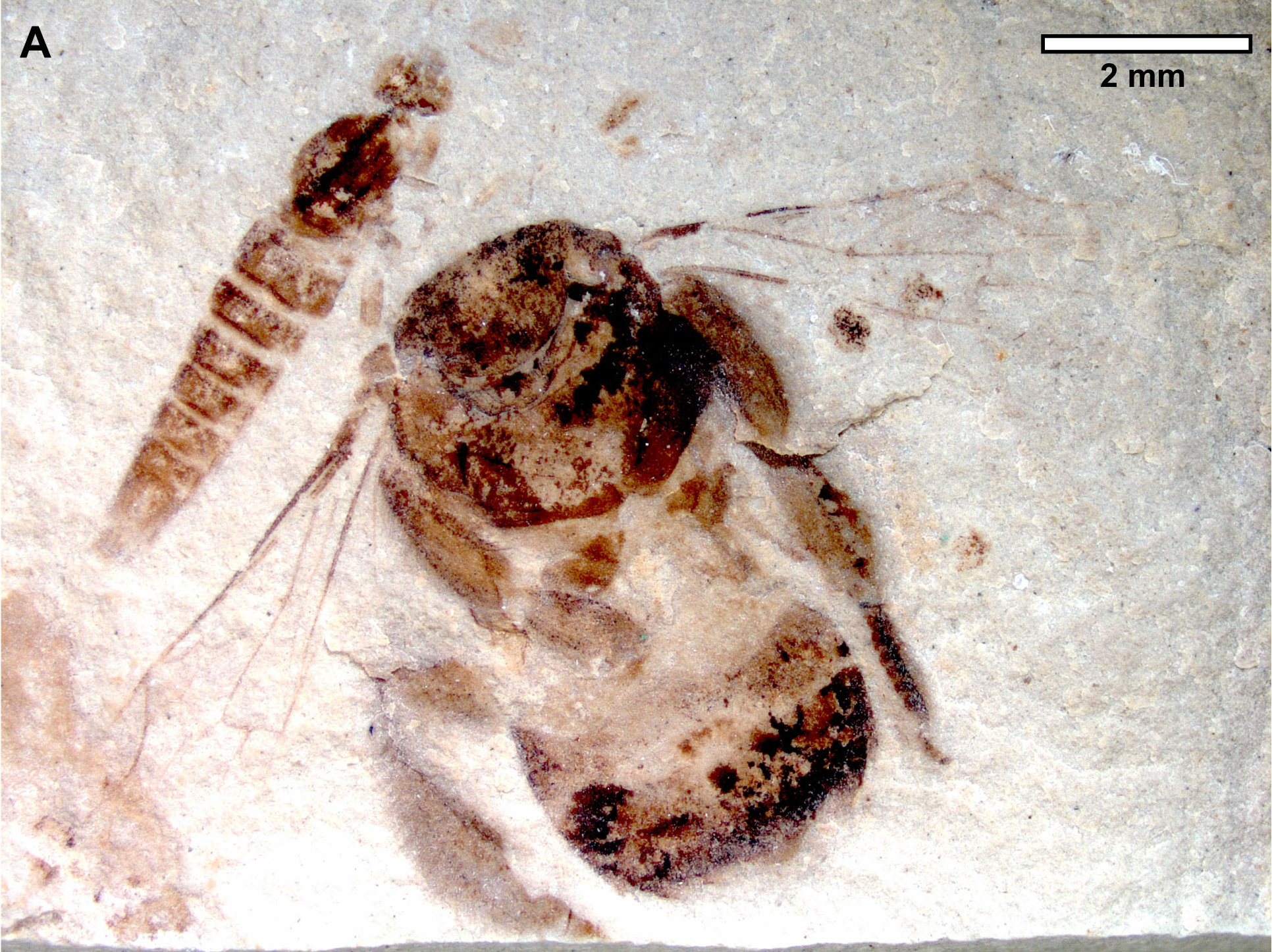
- E. biesmeijeri holotype

Scientific classification
- Kingdom: Animalia
- Phylum: Arthropoda
- Clade: Pancrustacea
- Class: Insecta
- Order: Hymenoptera
- Family: Apidae
- Genus: †Euglossopteryx; Dehon & Engel, 2014
- Species: †E. biesmeijeri

Binomial name
- †Euglossopteryx biesmeijeri De Meulemeester, Michez, & Engel, 2014

= Euglossopteryx =

Euglossopteryx Temporal range: Middle Eocene

Extinct genus of bees

Euglossopteryx is an extinct genus of bee in the family Apidae known from a fossil found in North America. There is one described species in the genus, Euglossopteryx biesmeijeri.

== History and classification ==
Euglossopteryx biesmeijeri was described from a solitary fossil, which is a compression-impression fossil preserved in layers of soft sedimentary rock. Along with other well preserved insect fossils, the E. biesmeijeri specimen was collected from layers of the Middle Eocene Parachute Creek Member of the Green River Formation. The formation is a group of Late Paleocene to Late Eocene depositional basins in Wyoming and Utah. The Parachute Creek Member is a composed of oil shales from a shallow mountain lake that existed for around 20 million years. Study of the paleoflora preserved in the shales indicates the lake was around 1,500–2,900 metres (4,900–9,500 ft) in elevation surrounded by a tropical to subtropical environment that had a distinct dry season.

At the time of study, the holotype was part of the Division of Entomology (Paleoentomology) collections, University of Kansas Natural History Museum. It was first studied by an international team of researchers headed by Manuel Dehon of the University of Mons, Belgium, with the teams 2014 type description of the genus and species was published in the natural sciences journal PLOS ONE. The genus name is a derived from a combination of the Euglossini type genus Euglossa combined with the Greek "pteryx" meaning wing. This is a reference to the similarity between Euglossopteryx biesmeijeri and species of Euglossa. The specific epithet biesmeijeri was coined as a patronym honoring the Belgian melittologist Jacobus Biesmeijer, who is a noted researcher of pollinator-plant interactions and pollinator declines.

The body and wing structuring indicate a relationship to members of the bee clade Corbiculata, which encompasses the living tribes Apini, Bombini, Euglossini, Meliponini and the extinct tribes Melikertini, Electrapini, and Electrobombini. The preserved pollen basket on the metatibia excluded placement of E. biesmeijeri into a cleptoparasitic Cuckoo bee genus. Within Corbiculata, Apini has a distinct wing marginal cell and Meliponini has very reduced wing venation, neither features seen in E. biesmeijeri. The wing venation of the species is closest to that seen in Euglossini, however the metatibia is not highly expanded as seen in Euglossini. As such Dehon et al did not give any placement in the clade, leaving Euglossopteryx as Corbiculata incertae sedis.

E. biesmeijeri is one of four bee species described by Dehon and team in the PLOS ONE article, the others being Andrena antoinei, Bombus cerdanyensis, and Protohabropoda pauli.

== Description ==
The E. biesmeijeri fossil is a female preserved with a dorsal view of the body, out stretched wings, and missing its head. The overall body length is not determinable due to slight curling of the body and the missing head, though the mesosoma is 4.00 mm (0.157 in). The metatibia are about 4.23 mm (0.167 in) long, not flared and enlarged notably, and with a distinct corbiculate pollen basket formed of a fringe of long setae. The original coloration and color pattering has been lost, so color pattern and if the color was metallic as in Euglossini species. The forewings have a one marginal cell and three cells below that called the submarginal cells. The marginal cell had a closed tip end that is notably rounded. The second and third submarginal cells together are longer than the first submarginal cell, which is the longest of the three cells. A pterostigma is present, but it incompletely preserved making observations difficult.
