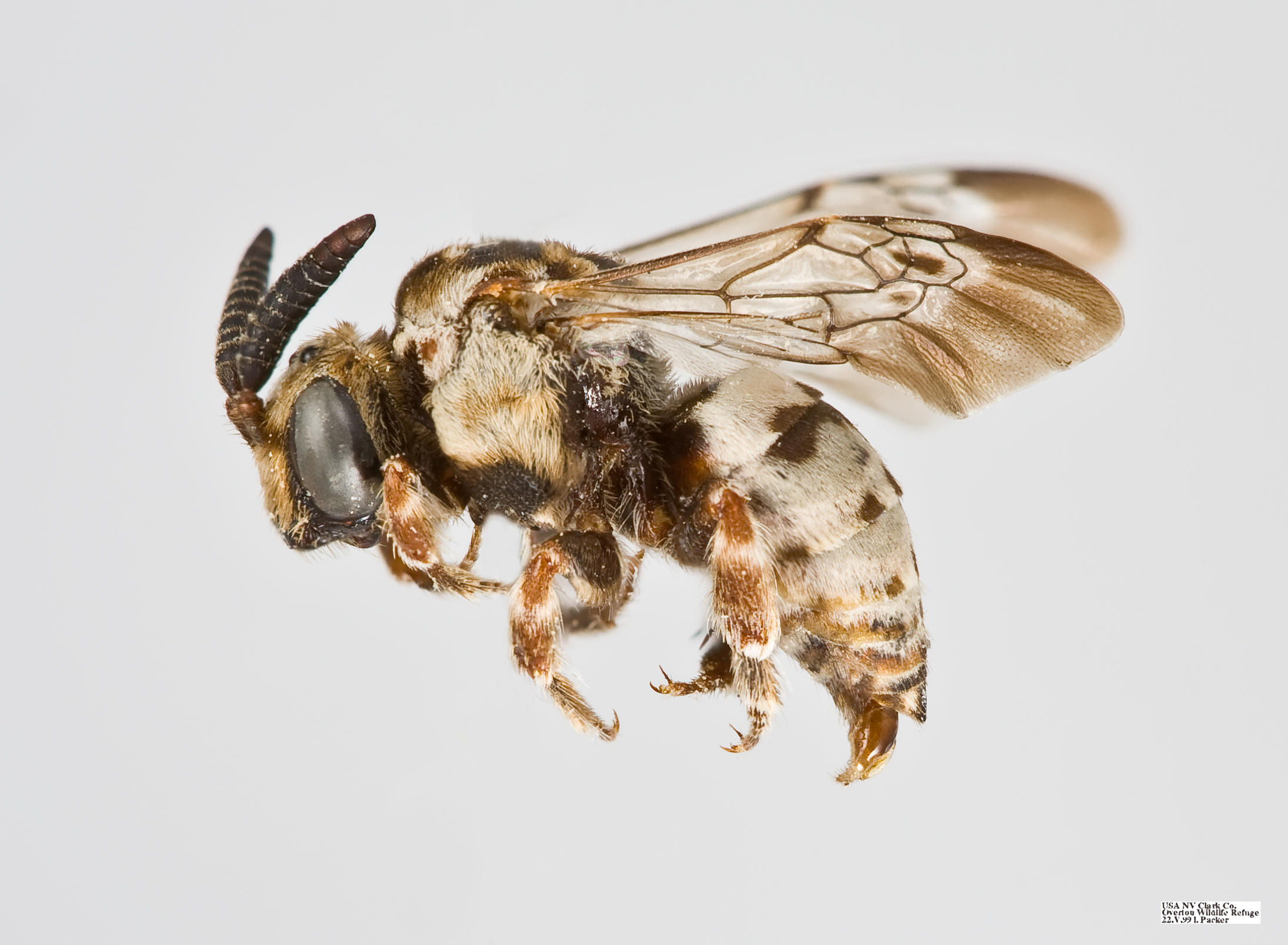
- Zacosmia maculata

Scientific classification
- Domain: Eukaryota
- Kingdom: Animalia
- Phylum: Arthropoda
- Class: Insecta
- Order: Hymenoptera
- Family: Apidae
- Tribe: Melectini
- Genus: Zacosmia; Ashmead, 1898
- Species: Z. maculata

Binomial name
- Zacosmia maculata (Cresson, 1879)

= Zacosmia =

Genus of bees

Zacosmia is a genus of cuckoo bees in the family Apidae, containing one described species, Zacosmia maculata.
