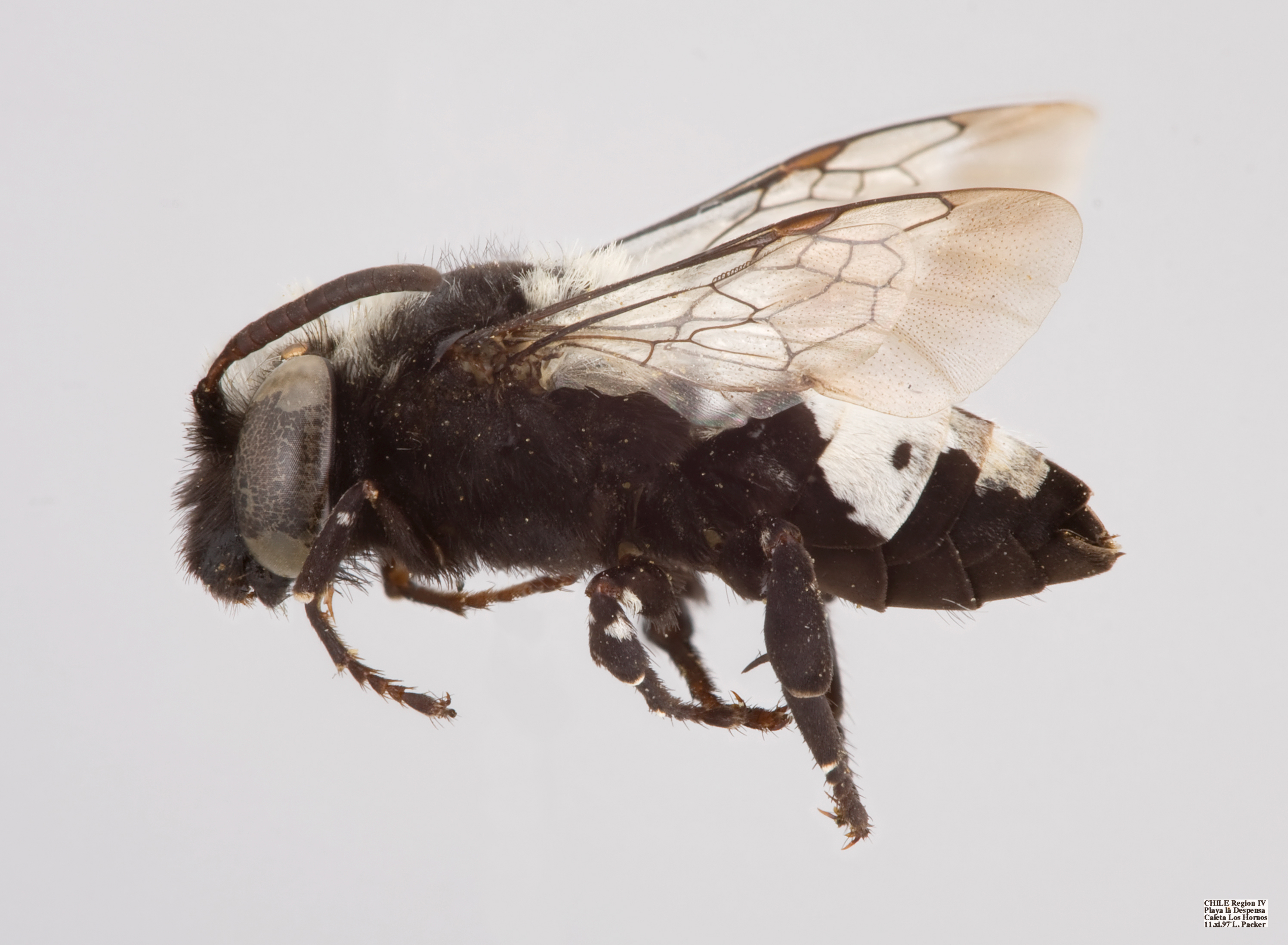
- Isepeolus wagenknechti, female

Scientific classification
- Kingdom: Animalia
- Phylum: Arthropoda
- Clade: Pancrustacea
- Class: Insecta
- Order: Hymenoptera
- Family: Apidae
- Subfamily: Apinae
- Tribe: Isepeolini

= Isepeolini =

Tribe of bees

The Isepeolini are a tribe of apid bees. Isepeolini is a tribe of cleptoparasitic bees (also known as "cuckoo bees") within the family Apidae. These bees do not build their own nests; instead, they lay their eggs in the nests of other bees, often targeting the genus Colletes.

== Genera ==
- Isepeolus
- Melectoides
