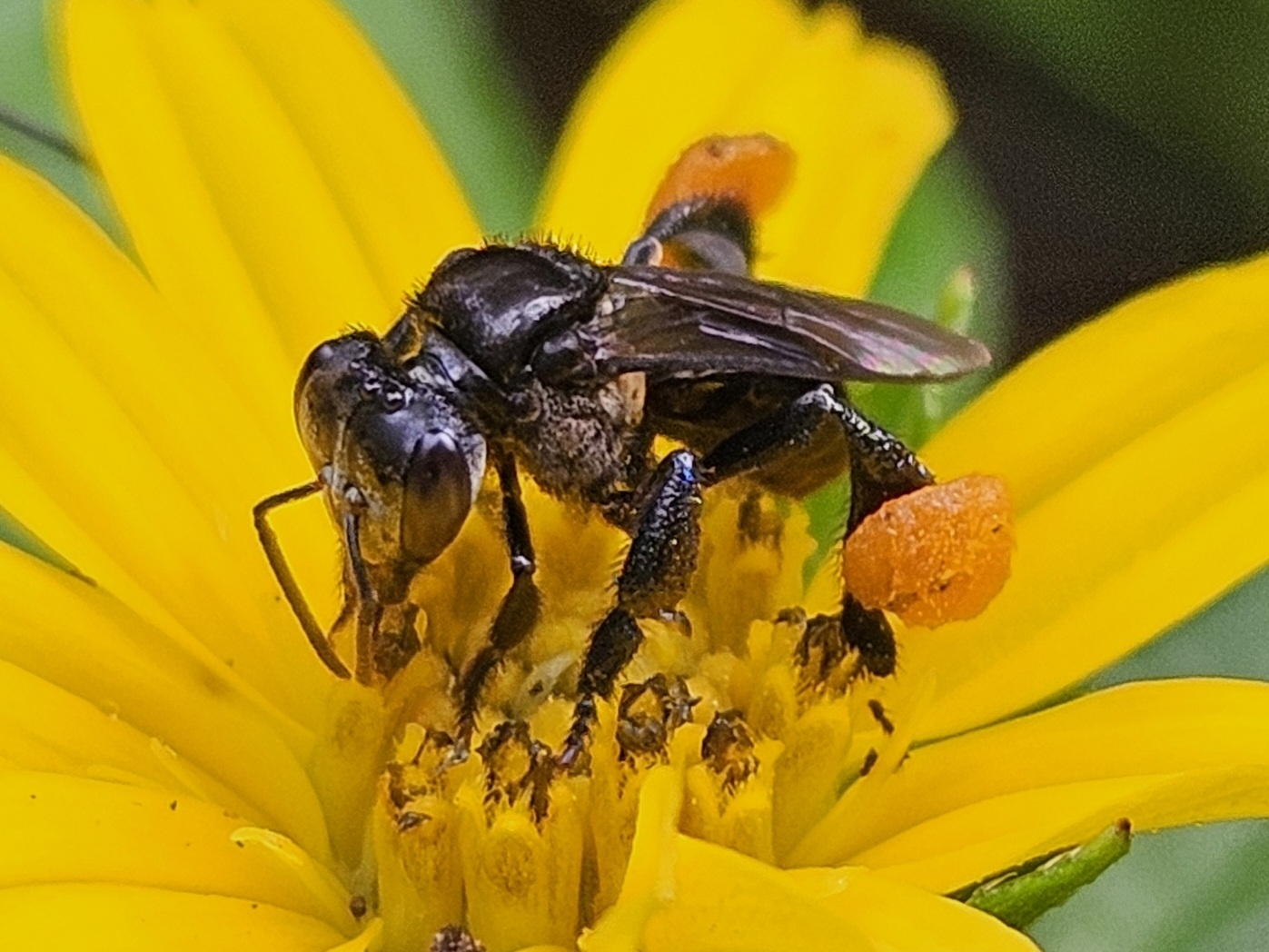

Scientific classification
- Kingdom: Animalia
- Phylum: Arthropoda
- Clade: Pancrustacea
- Class: Insecta
- Order: Hymenoptera
- Family: Apidae
- Genus: Heterotrigona
- Species: H. itama

Binomial name
- Heterotrigona itama (Cockerell, 1918)

= Heterotrigona itama =

Species of bee

Heterotrigona itama is a species of stingless bee.
