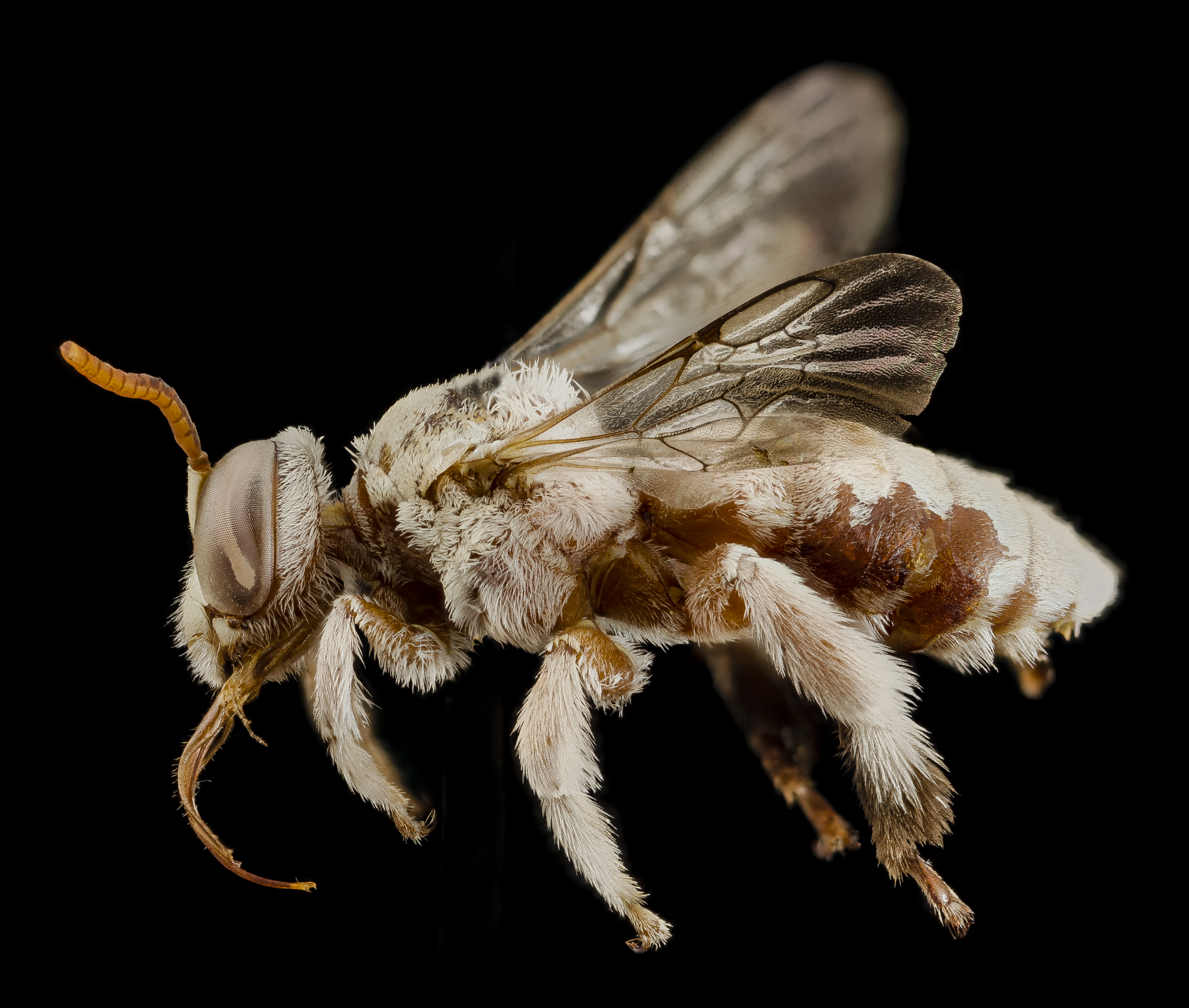
- Tarsalia persica

Scientific classification
- Kingdom: Animalia
- Phylum: Arthropoda
- Clade: Pancrustacea
- Class: Insecta
- Order: Hymenoptera
- Family: Apidae
- Tribe: Tarsaliini; Engel, 2015
- Genus: Tarsalia; Morowitz 1895

= Tarsaliini =

Tarsalia

Bee tribe

The Tarsaliini are a tribe of apine bees. They are between 7-13mm long. As of 2015, it only contains its type genus, Tarsalia, which was considered part of the tribe Ancylaini until Engel split it in 2015, he believes the Tarsaliini are more closely related to the Eucerini than the Ancylaini. An Arabian and North African tribe, the Tarsaliini have been observed in Egypt, Sudan, Israel, Iran, and the Arabian Peninsula.

== Species ==
The following species are recognised in the genus Tarsalia:

- Tarsalia ancyliformis Popov, 1935
- Tarsalia cellularis (Cameron, 1898)
- Tarsalia cypriaca Mavromoustakis, 1952
- Tarsalia deccana Baker, 1972
- Tarsalia hirtipes Morawitz, 1895
- Tarsalia kindahensis Engel, 2017
- Tarsalia mimetes (Cockerell, 1933)
- Tarsalia persica (Warncke, 1979)
- Tarsalia strobilanthae Baker, 1998
