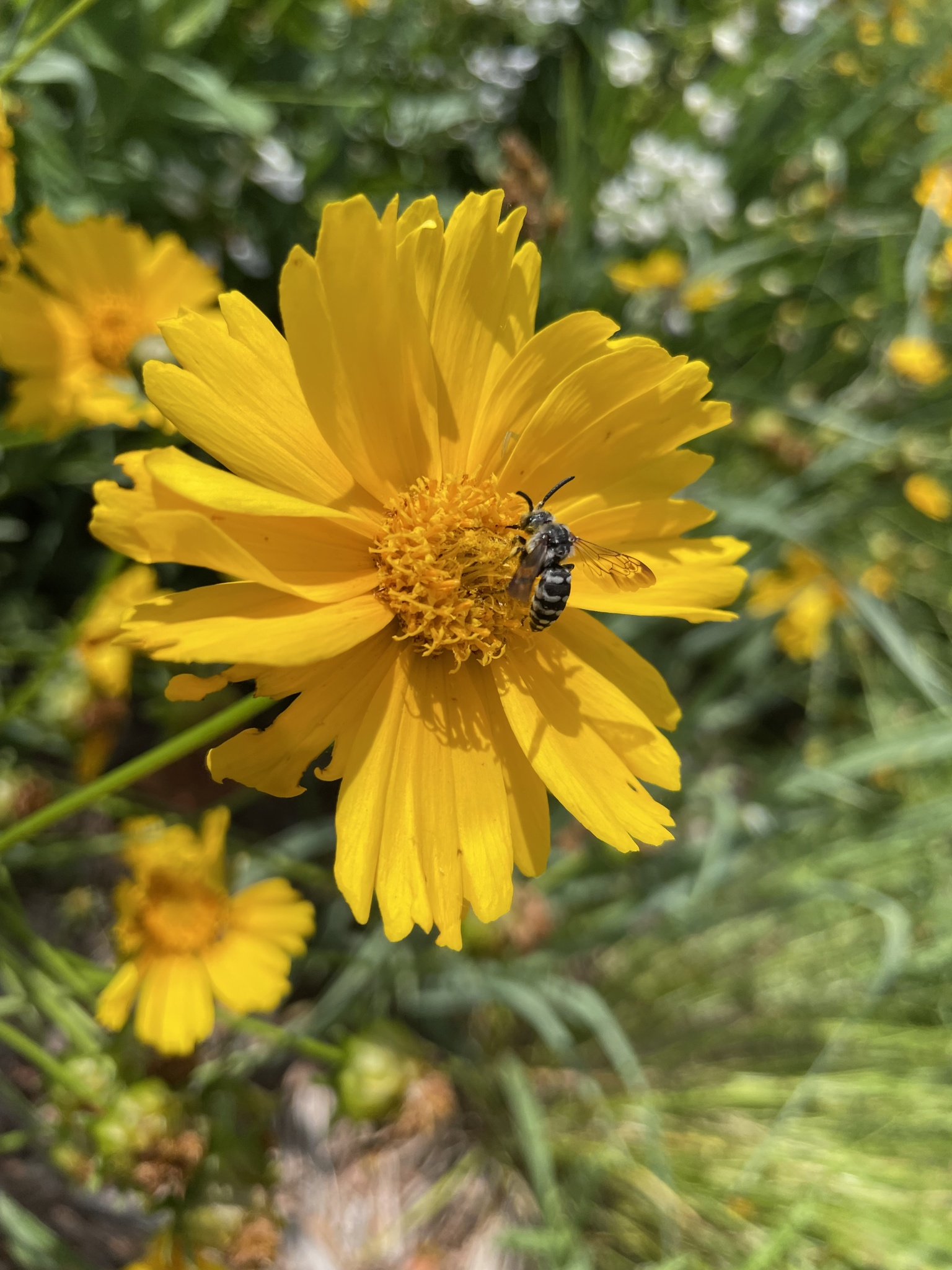

Scientific classification
- Domain: Eukaryota
- Kingdom: Animalia
- Phylum: Arthropoda
- Class: Insecta
- Order: Hymenoptera
- Family: Apidae
- Genus: Brachymelecta
- Species: B. californica

Binomial name
- Brachymelecta californica (Cresson, 1878)

Synonyms
- Melecta californica Cresson, 1878; Melecta californica miranda Fox, 1893

= Brachymelecta californica =

Species of bee

Brachymelecta californica, also known as the California digger-cuckoo bee, is a species of cuckoo bee in the family Apidae, found in Central America and North America.
