= Brachymelecta interrupta =

Scientific classification
- Domain: Eukaryota
- Kingdom: Animalia
- Phylum: Arthropoda
- Class: Insecta
- Order: Hymenoptera
- Family: Apidae
- Genus: Brachymelecta
- Species: B. interrupta

Binomial name
- Brachymelecta interrupta (Cresson, 1872)

Species of bee

Brachymelecta interrupta is a species of digger-cuckoo bee in the family Apidae, found in Central America and North America.
