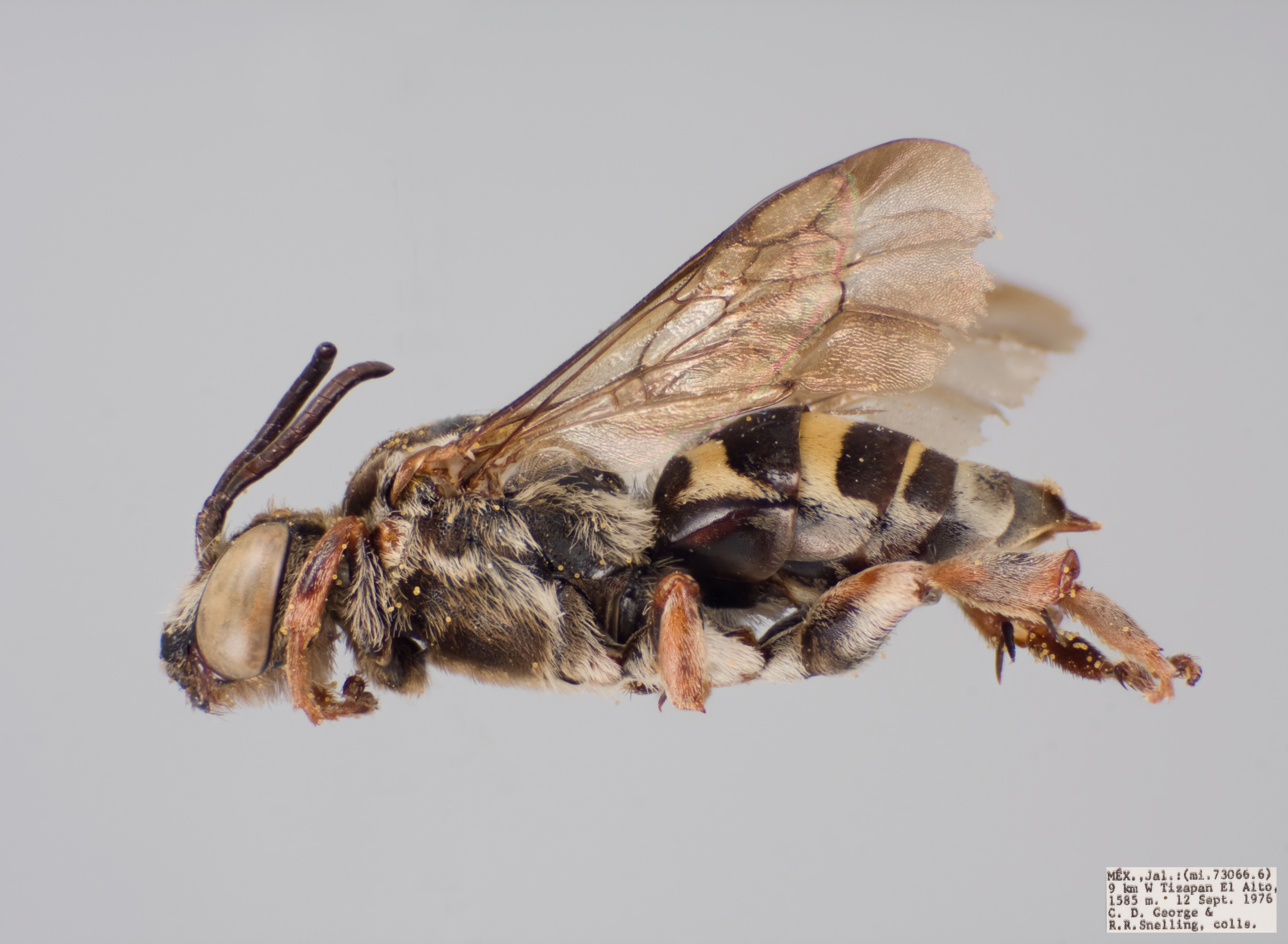

Scientific classification
- Domain: Eukaryota
- Kingdom: Animalia
- Phylum: Arthropoda
- Class: Insecta
- Order: Hymenoptera
- Family: Apidae
- Tribe: Protepeolini
- Genus: Leiopodus
- Species: L. singularis

Binomial name
- Leiopodus singularis (Linsley & Michener, 1937)

= Leiopodus singularis =

Species of bee

Leiopodus singularis is a species of bee in the family Apidae. It is found in Central America and North America.

== Biology ==
This species is a kleptoparasite of Diadasia olivacea. They will perch alert outside the host nest and wait for the host to leave before entering for short visits of 20 seconds to inspect the nest, then on the last visit disappearing for 2 minutes to lay their own egg inside. Their eggs have a long incubation period compared to the host. Their first instar young does not feed, but dispatches the much larger host larva, and then molts to a second instar, and consumes the host's pollen provisions.
