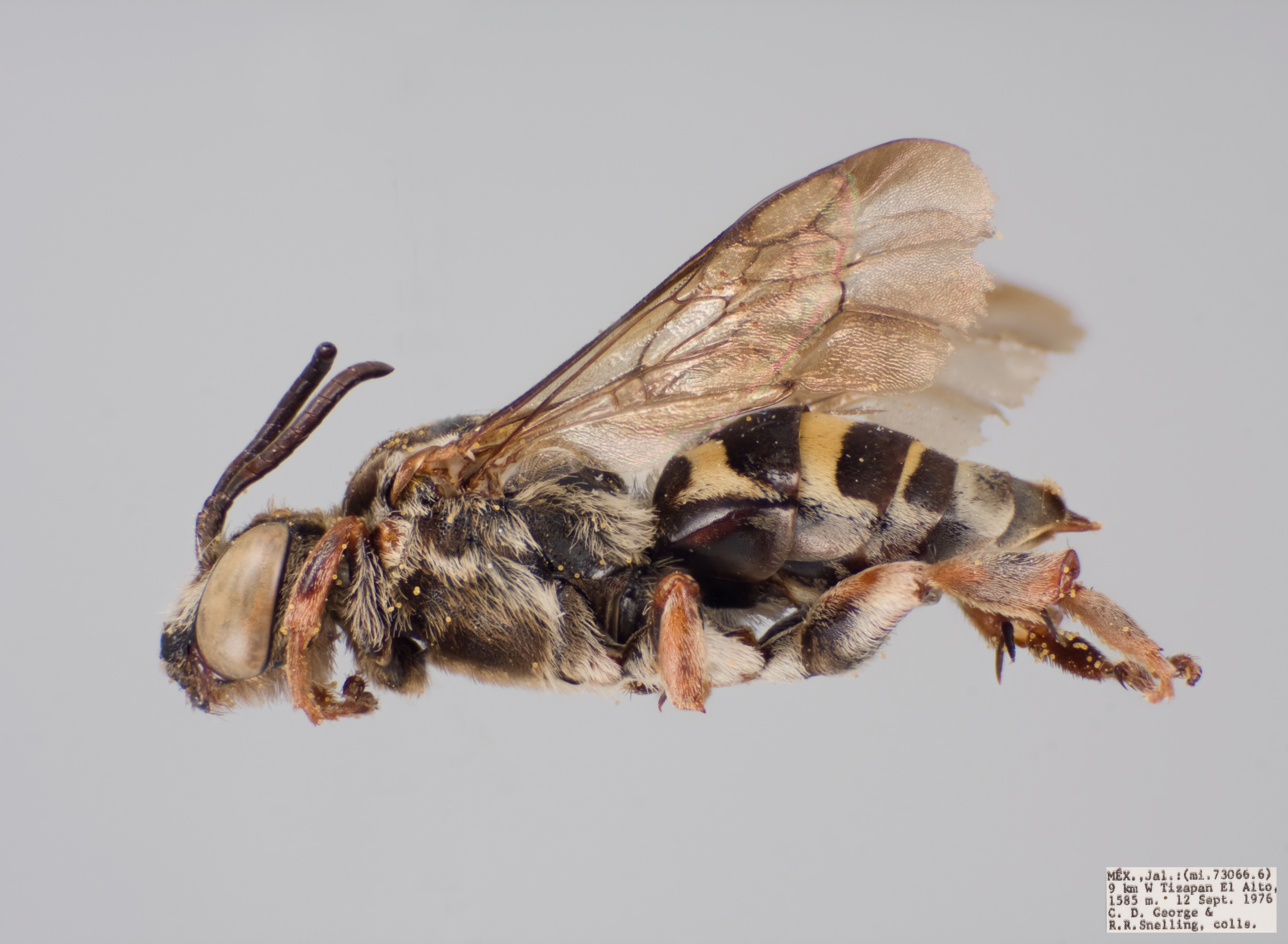
- Leiopodus singularis, female

Scientific classification
- Kingdom: Animalia
- Phylum: Arthropoda
- Clade: Pancrustacea
- Class: Insecta
- Order: Hymenoptera
- Family: Apidae
- Tribe: Protepeolini; Linsley and Michener, 1939
- Genus: Leiopodus; Smith, 1854

= Leiopodus =

Genus of bees

The Protepeolini are a tribe of cuckoo bees in the family Apidae, containing only one genus, Leiopodus.

== Species ==
- Leiopodus abnormis (Jörgensen, 1912)
- Leiopodus lacertinus Smith, 1854
- Leiopodus nigripes Friese, 1908
- Leiopodus singularis (Linsley & Michener, 1937)
- Leiopodus trochantericus Ducke, 1907
