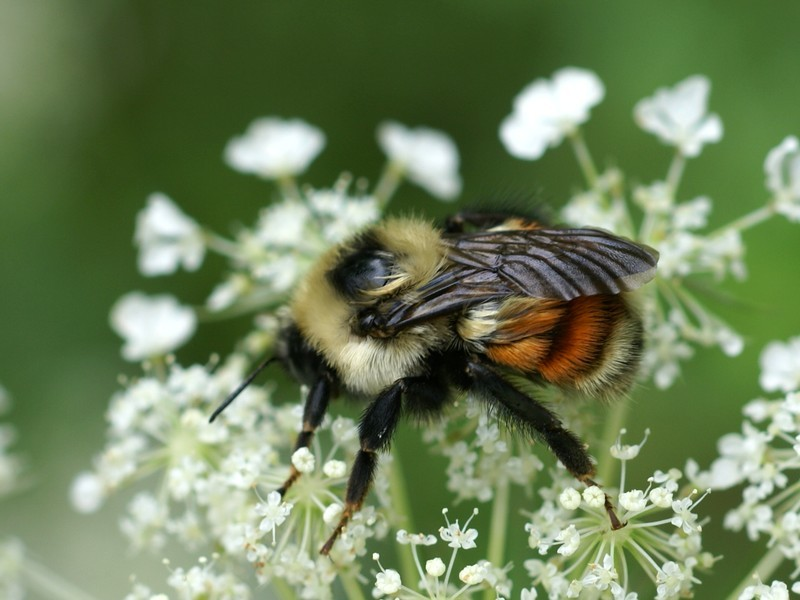

Conservation status
- Least Concern (IUCN 3.1)

Scientific classification
- Kingdom: Animalia
- Phylum: Arthropoda
- Clade: Pancrustacea
- Class: Insecta
- Order: Hymenoptera
- Family: Apidae
- Genus: Bombus
- Subgenus: Cullumanobombus
- Species: B. rufocinctus

Binomial name
- Bombus rufocinctus Cresson, 1863

= Bombus rufocinctus =

Species of bumblebee

some examples do not have a noticeable 'red belt'

Bombus rufocinctus is a species of bumblebee known commonly as the "red-belted bumblebee". It is native to North America where it has a wide distribution across Canada and the western, midwestern, and northeastern United States. It may occur in Mexico.

The queen is 1.6 to 1.8 centimeters long and just under a centimeter wide at the abdomen. It is black with scattered gray and yellowish hairs on the head. The abdomen has many bright yellow hairs and areas of reddish hairs. The worker is 1.1 to 1.2 centimeters long and half a centimeter wide at the abdomen. It is similar to the queen but it may have longer hairs. The male is 1.2 to 1.3 centimeters long and half a centimeter wide at the abdomen. It is mostly black with more yellow on the head and abdomen. This species displays four genetically controlled color polymorphisms: the second and third abdominal terga may have red or black hairs, and the fourth and fifth may be either yellow or black.

This small, short-tongued bee lives in and around wooded areas and it can be found in urban parks and gardens. It feeds on several kinds of plants, including chicories, snakeroots, strawberries, gumweeds, sunflowers, goldenrods, clovers, vetches, and goldeneyes. It usually nests on or above ground level.
