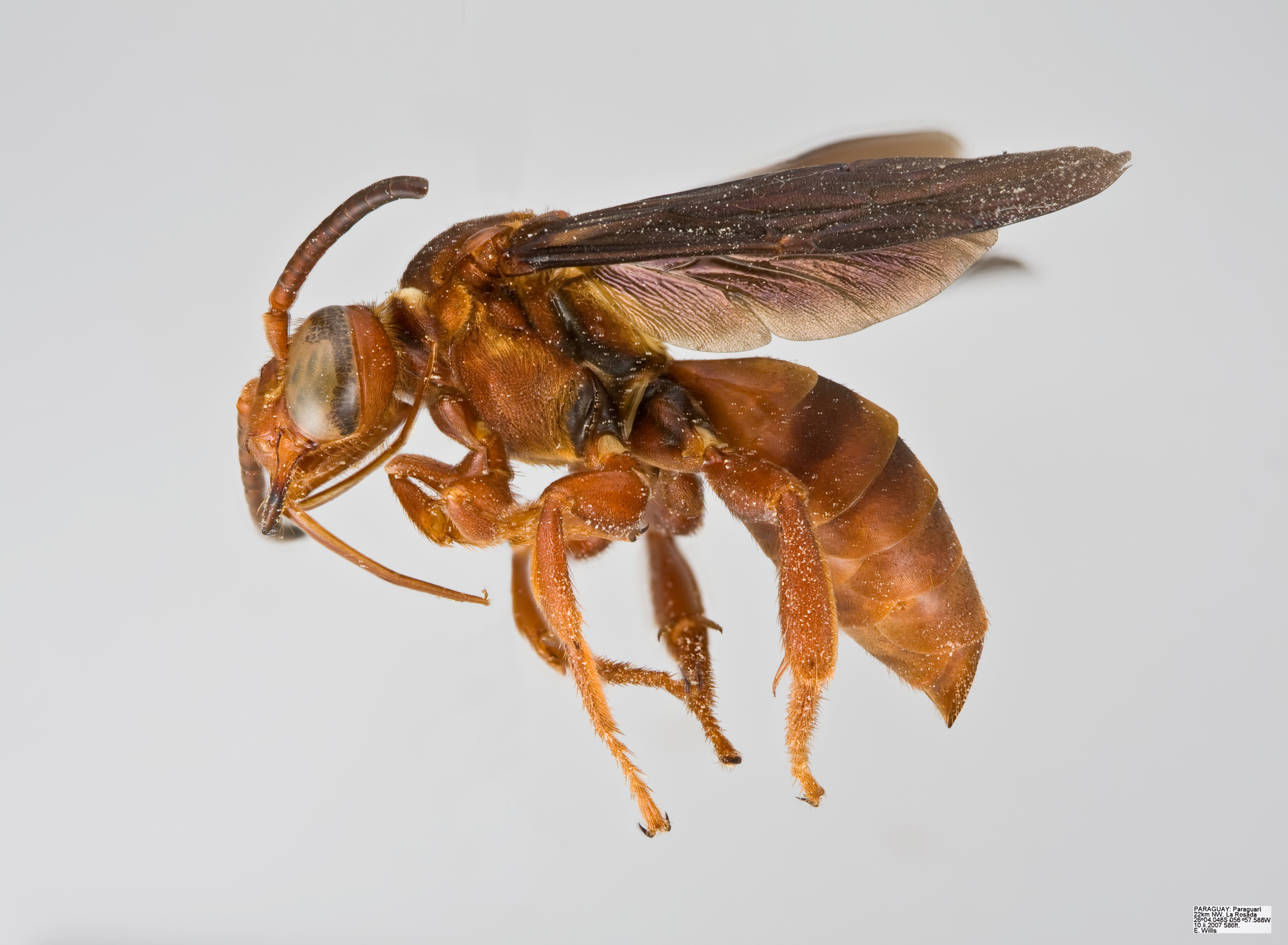
- female Rhathymus

Scientific classification
- Kingdom: Animalia
- Phylum: Arthropoda
- Class: Insecta
- Order: Hymenoptera
- Family: Apidae
- Genus: Rhathymus; Lepeletier & Audinet-Serville, 1828

= Rhathymus =

Genus of bees

Rhathymus is a genus of cuckoo bees belonging to the family Apidae.

Species of this genus are found in South America.

== Species ==
- Rhathymus ater (Smith, 1854)
- Rhathymus atitlanicus Ayala, Hinojosa-Díaz & Armas-Quiñonez, 2019
- Rhathymus beebei Cockerell, 1918
- Rhathymus bicolor Lepeletier & Audinet-Serville, 1828
- Rhathymus concolor Friese, 1921
- Rhathymus cristatus Ducke, 1907
- Rhathymus fulvus Friese, 1906
- Rhathymus insignis (Dominique, 1898)
- Rhathymus michaelis Friese, 1900
- Rhathymus nigripes Friese, 1912
- Rhathymus paraguayensis Schrottky, 1920
- Rhathymus quadriplagiatus (Smith, 1860)
- Rhathymus rufescens Friese, 1921
- Rhathymus scoliaeformis Schrottky, 1920
- Rhathymus trinitatis Cockerell, 1935
- Rhathymus unicolor (Smith, 1854)
- Rhathymus vespiformis (De Geer, 1773)
