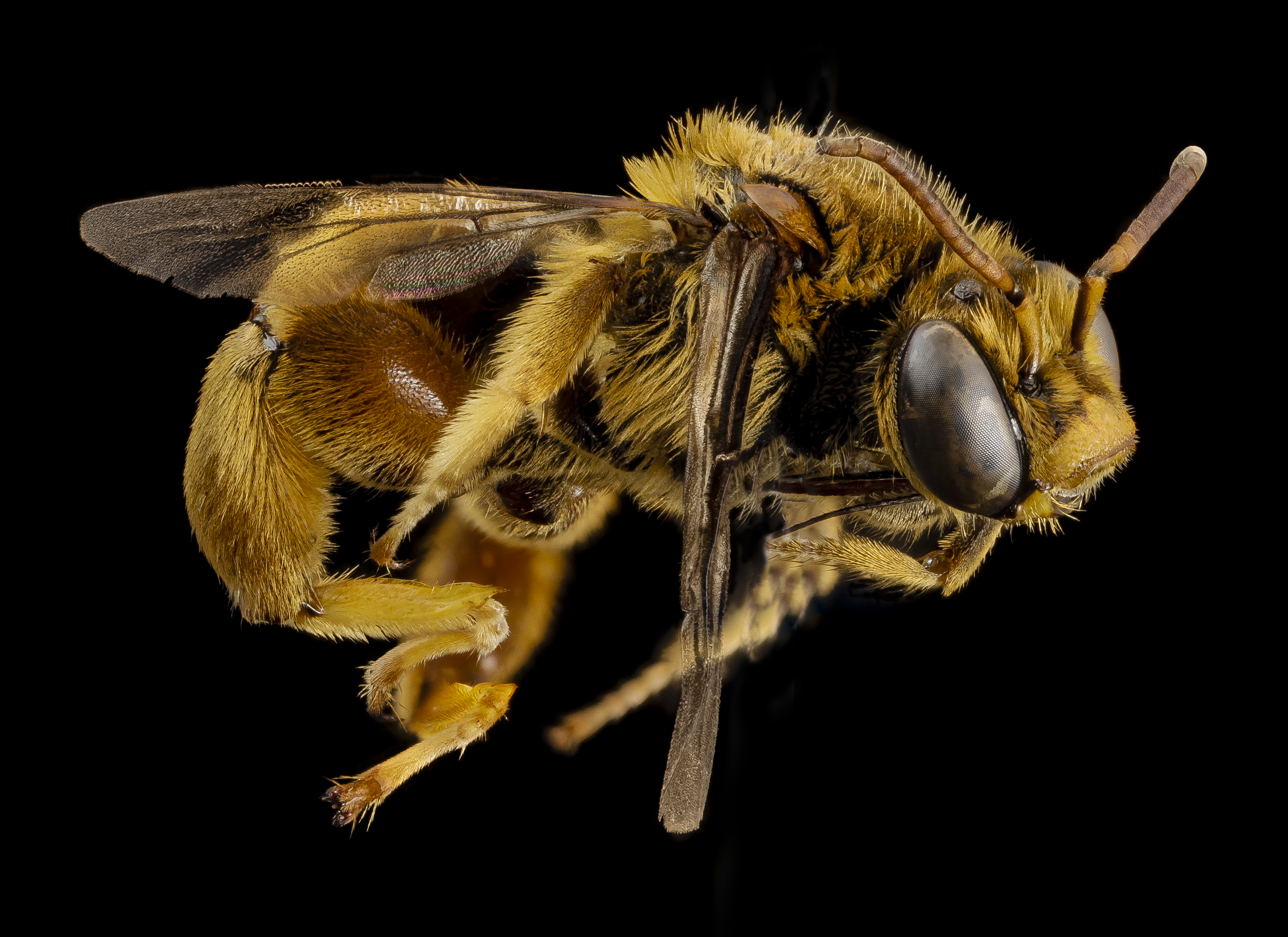
- Ancyloscelis ursinus

Scientific classification
- Kingdom: Animalia
- Phylum: Arthropoda
- Class: Insecta
- Order: Hymenoptera
- Family: Apidae
- Genus: Ancyloscelis; Latreille, 1829

= Ancyloscelis =

Genus of bees

Ancyloscelis is a genus of bees belonging to the family Apidae.

The species of this genus are found in America.

Species:

- Ancyloscelis apiformis (Fabricius, 1793)
- Ancyloscelis bonariensis Brèthes, 1910
- Ancyloscelis duckei Friese, 1904
- Ancyloscelis ecuadorius Friese, 1904
- Ancyloscelis frieseanus (Ducke, 1908)
- Ancyloscelis gigas Friese, 1904
- Ancyloscelis globulifer (Cockerell, 1918)
- Ancyloscelis halictoides (Holmberg, 1903)
- Ancyloscelis hertigi Michener, 1954
- Ancyloscelis melanostoma Cockerell, 1923
- Ancyloscelis mesopotamicus (Holmberg, 1903)
- Ancyloscelis nigricornis Rodriguez & Roig-Alsina, 2004
- Ancyloscelis panamensis Michener, 1954
- Ancyloscelis romani (Alfken, 1930)
- Ancyloscelis romeroi (Holmberg, 1903)
- Ancyloscelis saltensis Rodriguez & Roig-Alsina, 2004
- Ancyloscelis sejunctus Cockerell, 1933
- Ancyloscelis turmalis Vachal, 1904
- Ancyloscelis ursinus Haliday, 1836
- Ancyloscelis wheeleri (Cockerell, 1912)
