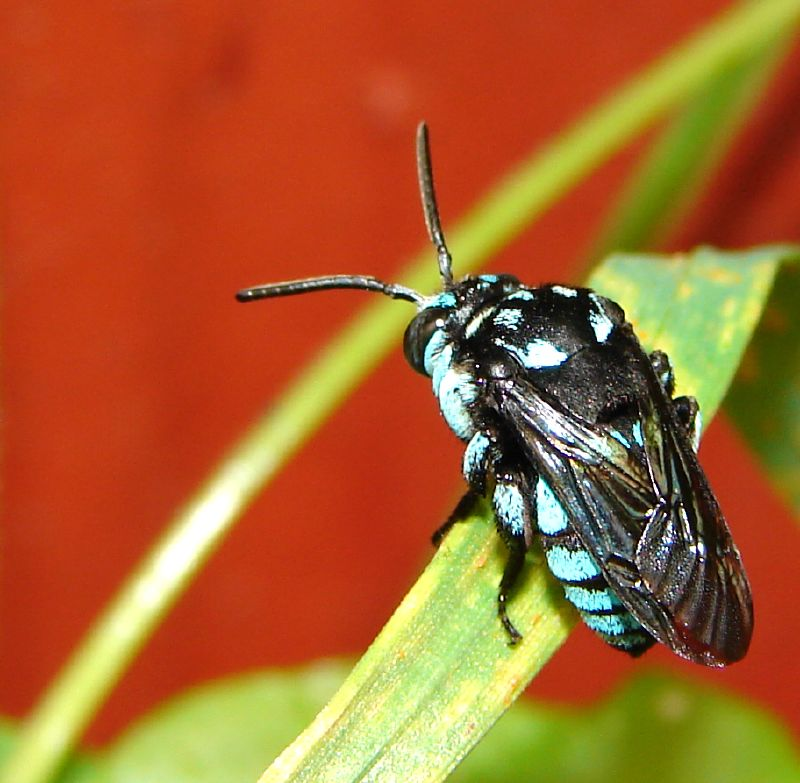
- Thyreus nitidulus

Scientific classification
- Kingdom: Animalia
- Phylum: Arthropoda
- Clade: Pancrustacea
- Class: Insecta
- Order: Hymenoptera
- Family: Apidae
- Subfamily: Apinae
- Tribe: Melectini; Westwood, 1839

Genera
- 9, see text

= Melectini =

Tribe of bees

The Melectini are a tribe of medium- to large-sized cuckoo bees in the family Apidae, found essentially worldwide. They are brood parasites of the related typical digger bees (Anthophorini) and occasionally visit flowers.

As in other cuckoo bees, females can be easily distinguished from those of their hosts by the lack of scopae and other pollen-collecting adaptations, as well as lacking prepygidial fimbria and basitibial plates. Their body hair is rather short and on the abdomen lies flat against the exoskeleton. They may, therefore, be difficult at first glance to distinguish from the Nomadinae, but the details of their wing venation are characteristic: the marginal cell is shorter than the first two submarginal cells, and the second abscissa of vein M+Cu is extremely short, with the cells it connects being almost adjacent to each other. The jugal lobes are very small, less than half as long as the vannal lobes.

== Genera ==
These bee genera belong to the Melectini:

- Afromelecta Lieftinck 1972
- Brachymelecta Linsley 1939
- Melecta Latreille 1802 (= Bombomelecta, Symmorpha)
- Sinomelecta Baker 1997
- Tetralonioidella Strand 1914 (= Callomelecta, Protomelissa)
- Thyreomelecta Rightmyer & Engel 2003
- Thyreus Panzer 1806 (= Crocissa, Crocisa)
- Zacosmia Ashmead 1898 (= Micromelecta)

Some of these (Afromelecta, Melecta) have subgenera which some authors may consider independent genera.
