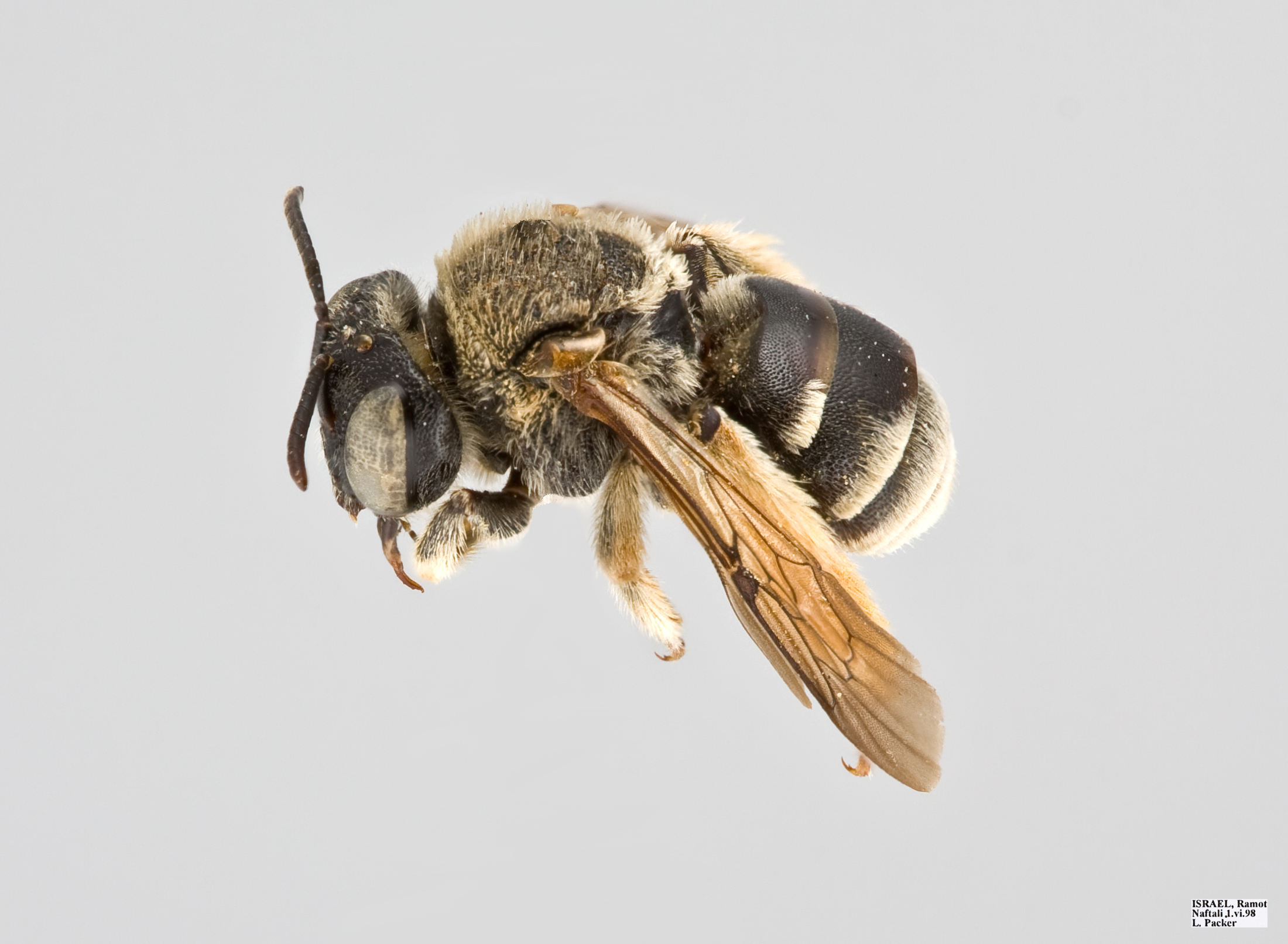
- Female Ancycla sp.

Scientific classification
- Kingdom: Animalia
- Phylum: Arthropoda
- Clade: Pancrustacea
- Class: Insecta
- Order: Hymenoptera
- Family: Apidae
- Subfamily: Apinae
- Tribe: Ancylaini; Michener, 1944

Genera
- Ancyla

= Ancylaini =

Tribe of bees

Ancylaini is a tribe of apid bees. The name was fixed by an ICZN opinion to differentiate it from the Ancylini tribe of fresh-water molluscs.
