= Céreste-en-Luberon =

Céreste-en-Luberon Ceirèsta (Occitan)
- Commune
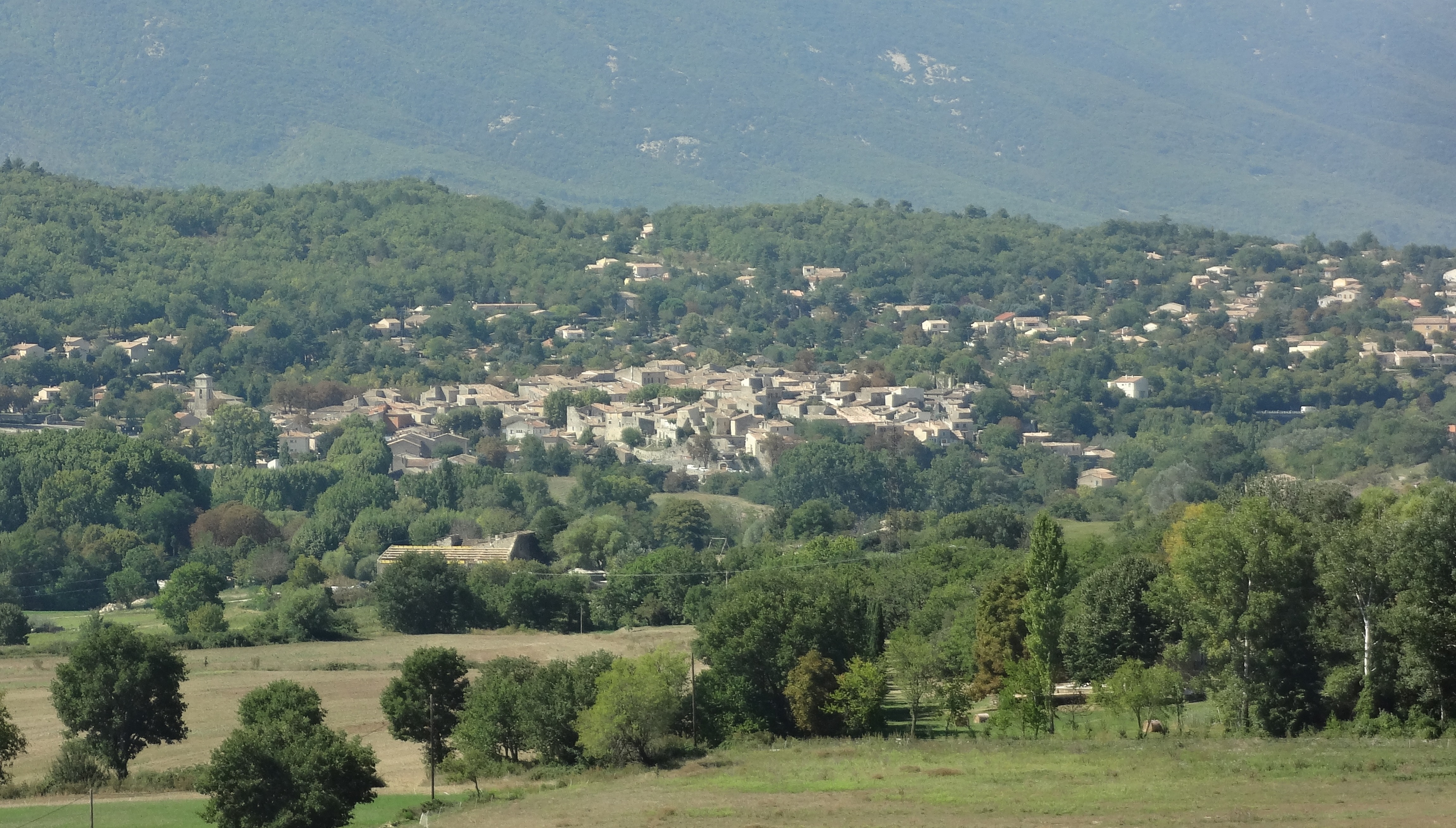
- The village of Céreste-en-Luberon

- Coat of arms
- Location of Céreste-en-Luberon
- Location within France Location within Provence-Alpes-Côte d'Azur
- Coordinates: 43°51′24″N 5°35′16″E
- Country: France
- Region: Provence-Alpes-Côte d'Azur
- Department: Alpes-de-Haute-Provence
- Arrondissement: Forcalquier
- Canton: Reillanne
- Intercommunality: CC Pays d'Apt-Luberon

Government
  - Mayor (2026–32): Gérard Baumel
- Area^{1}: 32.54 km^{2} (12.56 sq mi)
- Elevation: 370 m (1,210 ft)
- Highest elevation: 971 m (3,186 ft)
- Lowest elevation: 323 m (1,060 ft)
- Population (2023): 1,219
  - Density: 37.46/km^{2} (97.03/sq mi)
- Demonym: Cérestains
- Time zone: UTC+01:00 (CET)
  - Summer (DST): UTC+02:00 (CEST)
- INSEE/Postal code: 04045 /04280
- Website: www.cereste.fr
- ^{1} French Land Register data, which excludes lakes, ponds, glaciers > 1 km^{2} (0.386 sq mi or 247 acres) and river estuaries.

Céreste-en-Luberon (French pronunciation: [seʁɛst ɑ̃ lyb(ə)ʁɔ̃; -lybeʁɔ̃]; lit. 'Céreste-in-Luberon'; before 2024: Céreste; Occitan: Ceirèsta) is a commune in the Alpes-de-Haute-Provence department in southeastern France. It is known for its rich fossil beds in fine layers of "Calcaire de Campagne Calavon" limestone, which are now protected by the Parc naturel régional du Luberon and the Réserve naturelle géologique du Luberon.

== Geography ==
The river Calavon forms the commune's northern and northwestern borders. It borders Vaucluse to the south and southwest.

== History ==
A Gallo-Roman period settlement was established in the quarter of today's Saint-Sauveur priory, possibly as a crossing control point for the river. Surviving relics of the Roman period include a potters' oven, an ancient tomb and Sarcophagi at Saint-Sauveur.

The Priory of Carluc was founded in the eleventh century. Another priory, that of Saint-Sauveur-Au-Pont, belonged during the twelfth and thirteenth century to the Abbey of Saint Andrew at Villeneuve-lès-Avignon. The fiefdom was held initially by the Forcalquiers, and later by the Brancas family.

By the start of the eighteenth century, the Estieu brothers were running a pottery oven.

During the French Revolution the commune had its own Patriotic Society, a variation on the Jacobin Club theme, created in this case soon after 1792.

== Population ==
Historical population
Year	Pop.	±% p.a.
1968	757	—
1975	832	+1.36%
1982	862	+0.51%
1990	950	+1.22%
1999	1,036	+0.97%
2007	1,196	+1.81%
2012	1,242	+0.76%
2017	1,199	−0.70%
2023	1,219	+0.28%
Source: INSEE

== See also ==
- Luberon
- Communes of the Alpes-de-Haute-Provence department
