= Compression fossil =

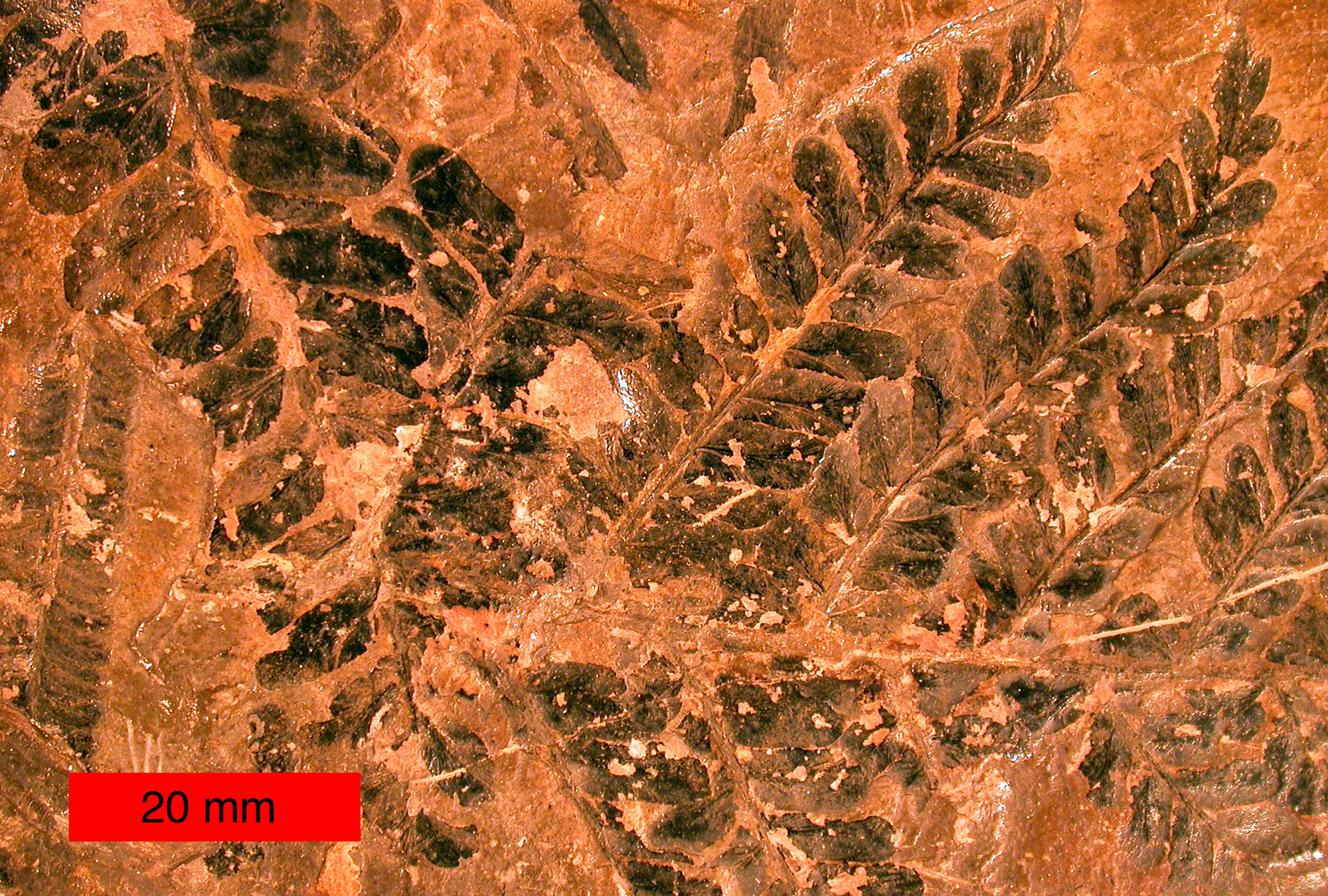
Fossil seed fern leaves from the Late Carboniferous of northeastern Ohio.

A compression fossil is a fossil preserved in sedimentary rock that has undergone physical compression. While it is uncommon to find animals preserved as good compression fossils, it is very common to find plants preserved this way. The reason for this is that physical compression of the rock often leads to distortion of the fossil.

The best fossils of leaves are found preserved in fine layers of sediment that have been compressed in a direction perpendicular to the plane of the deposited sediment. Since leaves are basically flat, the resulting distortion is minimal. Plant stems and other three-dimensional plant structures do not preserve as well under compression. Typically, only the basic outline and surface features are preserved in compression fossils; internal anatomy is not preserved. These fossils may be studied while still partially entombed in the sedimentary rock matrix where they are preserved, or once lifted out of the matrix by a peel or transfer technique.

Compression fossils are formed most commonly in environments where fine sediment is deposited, such as in river deltas, lagoons, along rivers, and in ponds. The best rocks in which to find these fossils preserved are clay and shale, although volcanic ash may sometimes preserve plant fossils as well.

== Slabs ==
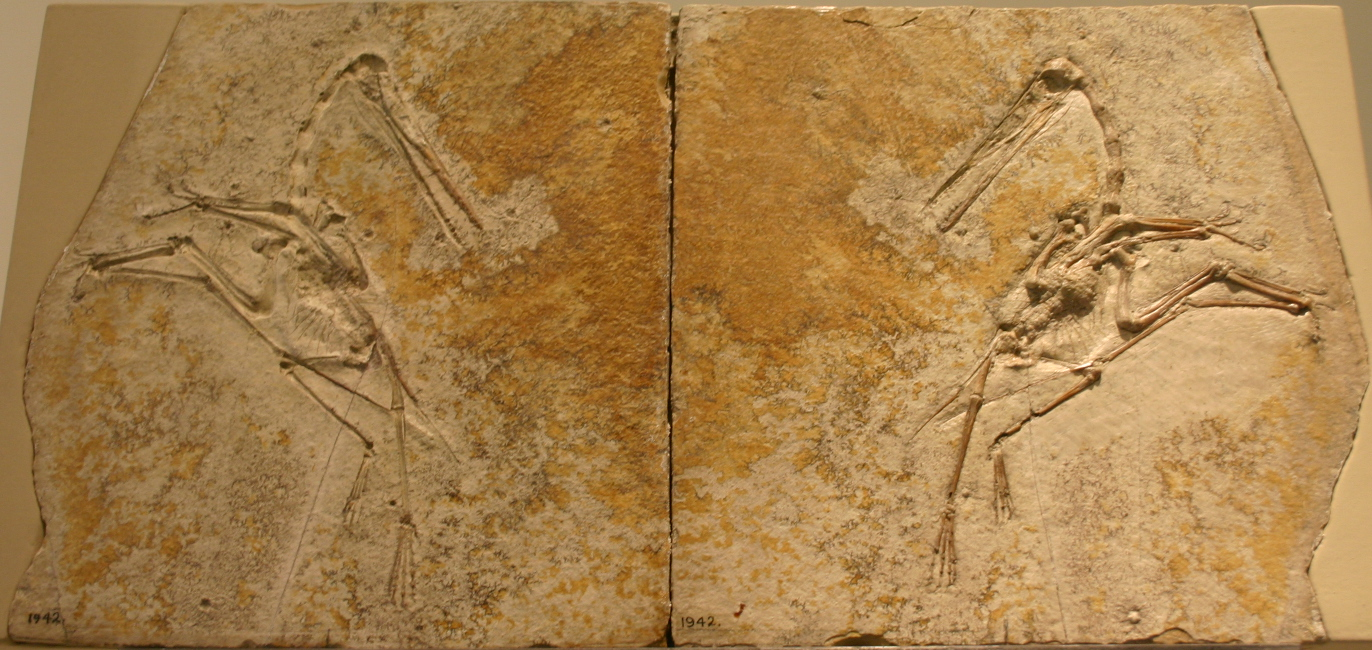
Counter slab (left) and slab (right) of Pterodactylus

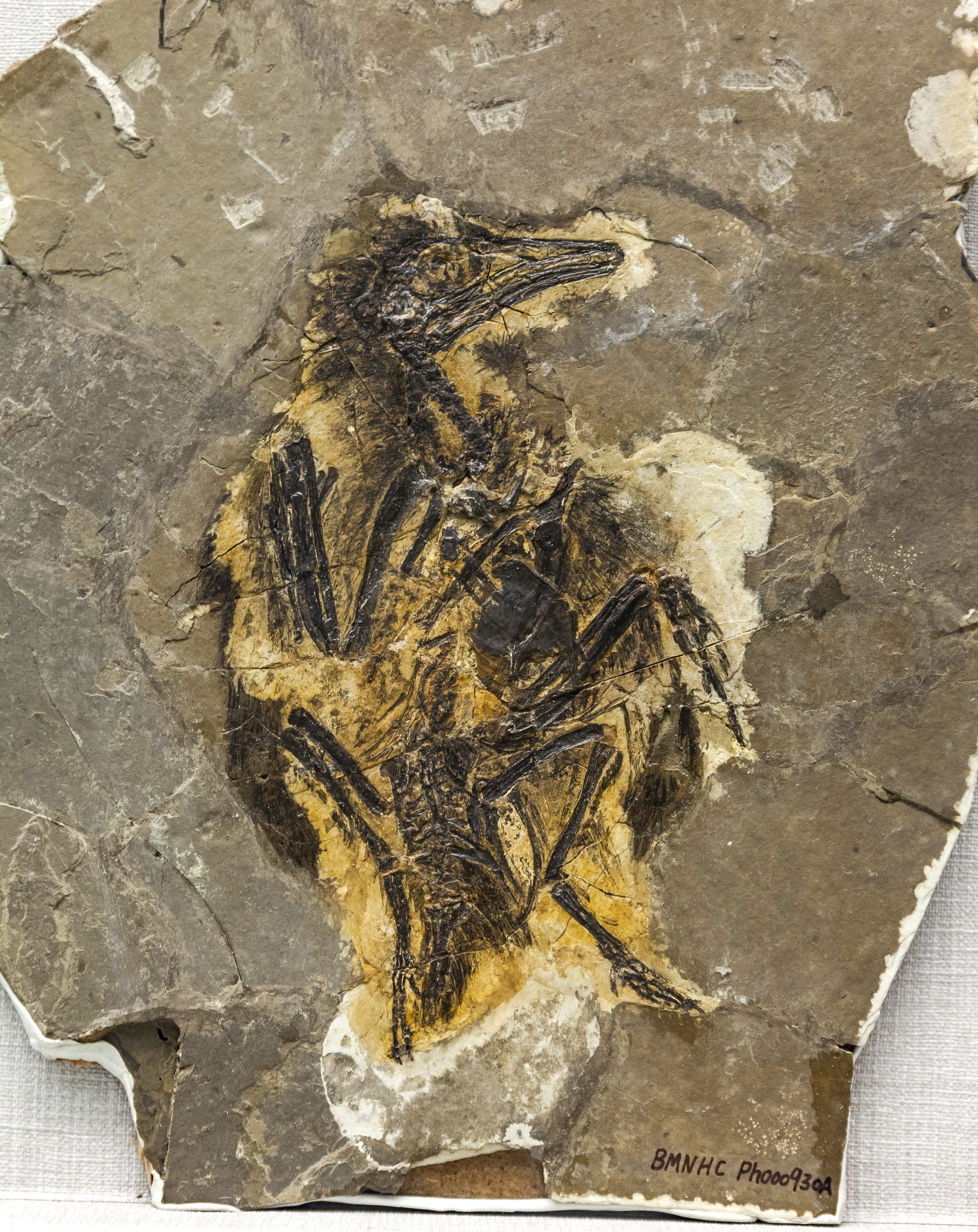
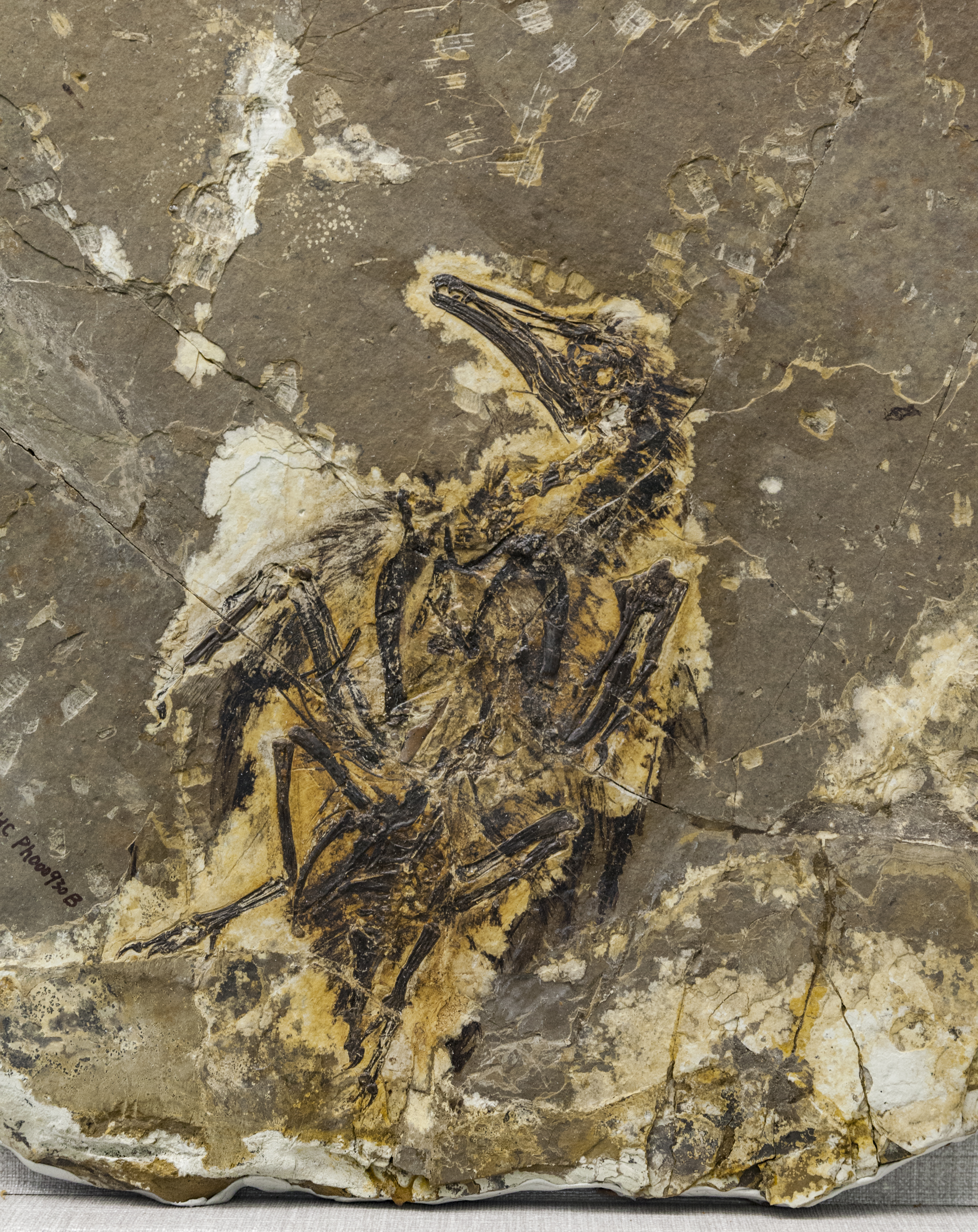
Slab (left) and counter slab (right) of Longipteryx

A slab and counter slab, more often called a part and counterpart in paleoentomology and paleobotany, are the matching halves of a compression fossil, a fossil-bearing matrix formed in sedimentary deposits. When excavated the matrix may be split along the natural grain or cleavage of the rock. A fossil embedded in the sediment may then also split down the middle, with fossil remains sticking to both surfaces, or the counter slab may simply show a negative impression or mould of the fossil. Comparing slab and counter slab has led to the exposure of a number of fossil forgeries.

Differences between the impressions on slab and counterslab led astronomer Fred Hoyle and applied physicist Lee Spetner in 1985 to declare that some Archaeopteryx fossils had been forged, a claim dismissed by most palaeontologists.

In its November 1999 edition, National Geographic magazine announced the discovery of Archaeoraptor, a link between dinosaurs and birds, from a 125 million-year-old fossil that had come from Liaoning Province of China. Chinese palaeontologist Xu Xing came into possession of the counter slab through a fossil hunter. On comparing his fossil with images of Archaeoraptor it became evident that it was a composite fake. His note to National Geographic led to consternation and embarrassment. Lewis Simons investigated the matter on behalf of National Geographic. In October 2000, he reported what he termed:

a tale of misguided secrecy and misplaced confidence, of rampant egos clashing, self-aggrandizement, wishful thinking, naïve assumptions, human error, stubbornness, manipulation, backbiting, lying, corruption, and, most of all, abysmal communication.

It was eventually determined that Archaeoraptor had been constructed from parts of an Early Cretaceous bird Yanornis martini and a small dinosaur Microraptor zhaoianus.

In order to increase their profit, fossil hunters and dealers occasionally sell slab and counter slab separately. A reptile fossil also found in Liaoning was described and named Sinohydrosaurus in 1999 by the Beijing Natural History Museum. In the same year the Institute of Vertebrate Paleontology and Paleoanthropology in Beijing described and named Hyphalosaurus lingyuanensis, unaware they were working with the counter slab of the same specimen. Hyphalosaurus is now the accepted name.
