= List of stingless bees of Brazil =

Below is a list of stingless bees of Brazil from Pedro (2014).

A total of 244 species belonging to 89 genera are found in Brazil.

== List of species ==
Species	Authority	Endemic to Brazil	States in Brazil	Common names
Aparatrigona impunctata	(Ducke, 1916)		Acre, Amapá Amazonas, Mato Grosso, Pará, Rondônia, Roraima	
Camargoia camargoi	Moure, 1989		Amapá, Amazonas	
Camargoia nordestina	Camargo, 1996	check	Bahia, Ceará, Piauí, Tocantins	
Camargoia pilicornis	(Ducke, 1910)	check	Maranhão, Pará	
Celetrigona euclydiana	Camargo & Pedro, 2009		Acre	
Celetrigona hirsuticornis	Camargo & Pedro, 2009	check	Acre, Amazonas, Mato Grosso, Rondônia	
Celetrigona longicornis	(Friese, 1903)		Amazonas, Goiás, Maranhão, Mato Grosso, Pará, Rondônia	
Celetrigona manauara	Camargo & Pedro, 2009		Amapá, Amazonas, Pará	
Cephalotrigona capitata	(Smith, 1854)		Amapá, Ceará, Espírito Santo, Mato Grosso, Minas Gerais, Pará, Paraná, Santa Catarina, São Paulo	mombucão
Cephalotrigona femorata	(Smith, 1854)		Amapá, Amazonas, Maranhão, Pará, Rondônia	
Dolichotrigona browni	Camargo & Pedro, 2005		Acre, Mato Grosso, Rondônia	
Dolichotrigona clavicornis	Camargo & Pedro, 2005	check	Acre, Amazonas, Rondônia	
Dolichotrigona longitarsis	(Ducke, 1916)		Acre, Amazonas, Maranhão, Mato Grosso, Pará, Rondônia	
Dolichotrigona mendersoni	Camargo & Pedro, 2005	check	Acre, Amazonas, Rondônia	
Dolichotrigona moratoi	Camargo & Pedro, 2005	check	Acre, Amazonas	
Dolichotrigona rondoni	Camargo & Pedro, 2005	check	Rondônia	
Dolichotrigona tavaresi	Camargo & Pedro, 2005	check	Acre, Amazonas	
Duckeola ghiliani	(Spinola, 1853)		Amapá, Amazonas, Mato Grosso, Pará, Rondônia	
Duckeola pavani	(Moure, 1963)		Amazonas	
Friesella schrottkyi	(Friese, 1900)	check	Espírito Santo, Minas Gerais, Paraná, São Paulo	
Frieseomelitta dispar	(Moure, 1950)	check	Bahia, Espírito Santo, Minas Gerais, Paraíba	
Frieseomelitta doederleini	(Friese, 1900)	check	Bahia, Ceará, Maranhão, Mato Grosso, Minas Gerais, Paraíba, Pernambuco, Piauí, Rio Grande do Norte	
Frieseomelitta flavicornis	(Fabricius, 1798)		Amapá, Amazonas, Pará, Roraima	
Frieseomelitta francoi	(Moure, 1946)	check	Bahia, Espírito Santo, Paraíba, Pernambuco, Sergipe	
Frieseomelitta freiremaiai	(Moure, 1963)		Bahia, Espírito Santo	
Frieseomelitta languida	Moure, 1990	check	Bahia, Goiás, Minas Gerais, São Paulo	
Frieseomelitta longipes	(Smith, 1854)		Pará	
Frieseomelitta meadewaldoi	(Cockerell, 1915)		(?)	
Frieseomelitta paranigra	(Schwarz, 1940)		Amazonas	
Frieseomelitta portoi	(Friese, 1900)		Amazonas, Maranhão, Pará	
Frieseomelitta silvestrii	(Friese, 1902)		Mato Grosso	
Frieseomelitta trichocerata	Moure, 1990		Amapá, Amazonas, Pará	
Frieseomelitta varia	(Lepeletier, 1836)		Bahia, Goiás, Mato Grosso, Minas Gerais, São Paulo, Tocantins	marmelada-amarela
Geotrigona aequinoctialis	(Ducke, 1925)	check	Ceará, Maranhão, Pará	
Geotrigona fulvohirta	(Friese, 1900)		Acre, Amazonas	
Geotrigona kwyrakai	Camargo & Moure, 1996	check	Pará, Rondônia	
Geotrigona mattogrossensis	(Ducke, 1925)		Mato Grosso, Pará, Rondônia	
Geotrigona mombuca	(Smith, 1863)		Bahia, Goiás, Maranhão, Mato Grosso, Mato Grosso do Sul, Minas Gerais, Pará, Piauí, São Paulo, Tocantins	
Geotrigona subfulva	Camargo & Moure, 1996	check	Amazonas	
Geotrigona subgrisea	(Cockerell, 1920)		Roraima	
Geotrigona subnigra	(Schwarz, 1940)		Amapá, Amazonas, Pará	
Geotrigona subterranea	(Friese, 1901)	check	Bahia, Minas Gerais, Paraná, São Paulo	
Geotrigona xanthopoda	Camargo & Moure, 1996	check	Paraíba, Pernambuco	
Lestrimelitta ciliata	Marchi & Melo, 2006	check	Pará	
Lestrimelitta ehrhardti	(Friese, 1931)	check	Alagoas, Espírito Santo, Minas Gerais, Paraná, Rio de Janeiro, Santa Catarina, São Paulo	
Lestrimelitta glaberrima	Oliveira & Marchi, 2005		Amapá	
Lestrimelitta glabrata	Camargo & Moure, 1996		Acre, Amazonas, Mato Grosso, Roraima	
Lestrimelitta limao	(Smith, 1863)		Bahia, Ceará, Federal District, Goiás, Maranhão, Minas Gerais, Rondônia, São Paulo	canudo, iraxim, limão
Lestrimelitta maracaia	Marchi & Melo, 2006	check	Amazonas, Rondônia, Roraima	
Lestrimelitta monodonta	Camargo & Moure, 1989	check	Amazonas, Maranhão, Pará, Roraima	
Lestrimelitta nana	Melo, 2003	check	Amapá	
Lestrimelitta rufa	(Friese, 1903)		Amazonas, Mato Grosso, Pará, Rondônia	
Lestrimelitta rufipes	(Friese, 1903)		Amazonas, Bahia, Ceará, Espírito Santo, Goiás, Maranhão, Mato Grosso, Minas Gerais, Pará, Paraná, Piauí, Rio Grande do Sul, Rondônia, Roraima, Santa Catarina, São Paulo, Tocantins	
Lestrimelitta similis	Marchi & Melo, 2006	check	Pará	
Lestrimelitta spinosa	Marchi & Melo, 2006		Pará	
Lestrimelitta sulina	Marchi & Melo, 2006		Paraná, Rio Grande do Sul, Santa Catarina	
Lestrimelitta tropica	Marchi & Melo, 2006	check	Bahia, Ceará, Rio de Janeiro	
Leurotrigona gracilis	Pedro & Camargo, 2009	check	Acre, Amazonas, Rondônia	
Leurotrigona muelleri	(Friese, 1900)		Bahia, Espírito Santo, Goiás, Maranhão, Mato Grosso, Mato Grosso do Sul, Minas Gerais, Paraná, Paraíba, Rondônia, Santa Catarina, São Paulo	lambe-olhos
Leurotrigona pusilla	Moure & Camargo, in Moure et al., 1988		Amapá, Amazonas, Pará	
Melipona amazonica (= Eomelipona amazonica)	Schulz, 1905	check	Acre, Amapá, Amazonas, Pará, Rondônia	
Melipona asilvai (= Eomelipona asilvai)	Moure, 1971	check	Alagoas, Bahia, Ceará, Minas Gerais, Paraíba, Pernambuco, Piauí, Rio Grande do Norte, Sergipe	
Melipona bicolor (= Eomelipona bicolor)	Lepeletier, 1836		Bahia, Espírito Santo, Minas Gerais, Paraná, Rio de Janeiro, Rio Grande do Sul, Santa Catarina, São Paulo	guaraipo
Melipona bradley (= Eomelipona bradley)	Schwarz, 1932		Amapá, Amazonas, Mato Grosso, Pará, Rondônia, Roraima	
Melipona illustris (= Eomelipona illustris)	Schwarz, 1932		Pará, Mato Grosso	
Melipona marginata (= Eomelipona marginata)	Lepeletier, 1836	check	Bahia, Ceará, Espírito Santo, Goiás, Minas Gerais, Rio de Janeiro, São Paulo	
Melipona ogilviei (= Eomelipona ogilviei)	Schwarz, 1932		Amapá, Amazonas, Pará, Tocantins	
Melipona puncticollis (= Eomelipona puncticollis)	Friese, 1902		Amazonas?, Maranhão, Pará	
Melipona torrida (= Melipona obscurior, Eomelipona torrida)	Friese, 1916		Mato Grosso?, Paraná, Rio Grande do Sul, Santa Catarina, São Paulo; see Melo, 2013	
Melipona tumupasae (= Eomelipona tumupasae)	Schwarz, 1932		Acre	
Melipona compressipes (= Melikerria compressipes)	(Fabricius, 1804)		Amapá, Amazonas, Roraima	tiúba
Melipona fasciculata (= Melikerria fasciculata)	Smith, 1854	check	Maranhão, Mato Grosso, Pará, Piauí, Tocantins	
Melipona grandis (= Melikerria grandis)	Guérin, 1834		Acre, Amazonas, Mato Grosso, Rondônia	
Melipona interrupta (= Melikerria interrupta)	Latreille, 1811		Amapá, Amazonas, Pará	
Melipona quinquefasciata (= Melikerria quinquefasciata)	Lepeletier, 1836		Ceará, Federal District, Espírito Santo, Goiás, Mato Grosso, Mato Grosso do Sul, Minas Gerais, Paraná, Rio de Janeiro, Rio Grande do Sul, Rondônia, Santa Catarina, São Paulo	
Melipona favosa (= Melipona favosa)	(Fabricius, 1798)		Roraima	
Melipona mandacaia (= Melipona mandacaia)	Smith, 1863	check	Alagoas, Bahia, Ceará, Paraíba, Pernambuco, Piauí, Rio Grande do Norte, Sergipe	
Melipona orbignyi (= Melipona orbignyi)	(Guérin, 1844)		Mato Grosso, Mato Grosso do Sul	
Melipona quadrifasciata (= Melipona quadrifasciata)	Lepeletier, 1836		Alagoas, Bahia, Espírito Santo, Goiás, Mato Grosso do Sul, Minas Gerais, Paraíba, Paraná, Pernambuco, Rio de Janeiro, Rio Grande do Sul, Santa Catarina, São Paulo, Sergipe	
Melipona subnitida (= Melipona subnitida)	Ducke, 1910	check	Alagoas, Bahia, Ceará, Maranhão, Paraíba, Pernambuco, Piauí, Rio Grande do Norte, Sergipe	
Melipona brachychaeta (= Michmelia brachychaeta)	Moure, 1950		Mato Grosso, Rondônia	
Melipona captiosa (= Michmelia captiosa)	Moure, 1962		Amapá, Amazonas	
Melipona capixaba (= Michmelia capixaba)	Moure & Camargo, 1994	check	Espírito Santo	
Melipona cramptoni (= Michmelia cramptoni)	Cockerell, 1920		Roraima	
Melipona crinita (= Michmelia crinita)	Moure & Kerr, 1950		Acre, Amazonas, Rondônia	
Melipona dubia (= Michmelia dubia)	Moure & Kerr, 1950	check	Acre, Amazonas, Rondônia	
Melipona eburnea (= Michmelia eburnea)	Friese, 1900		Acre, Amazonas	
Melipona flavolineata (= Michmelia flavolineata)	Friese, 1900	check	Ceará?, Maranhão, Pará, Tocantins	
Melipona fuliginosa (= Michmelia fuliginosa)	Lepeletier, 1836		Acre, Amazonas, Bahia, Espírito Santo, Mato Grosso, Pará, Piauí?, São Paulo	
Melipona fulva (= Michmelia fulva)	Lepeletier, 1836		Amapá, Amazonas, Pará, Roraima	
Melipona fuscopilosa (= Michmelia fuscopilosa)	Moure & Kerr, 1950		Acre, Amazonas	
Melipona lateralis (= Michmelia lateralis)	Erichson, 1848		Amapá, Amazonas, Pará, Roraima	
Melipona melanoventer (= Michmelia melanoventer)	Schwarz, 1932	check	Acre?, Amazonas, Maranhão, Mato Grosso, Pará, Rondônia	
Melipona mondury (= Michmelia mondury)	Smith, 1863	check	Bahia, Espírito Santo, Minas Gerais, Paraná, Rio de Janeiro, Rio Grande do Sul?, Santa Catarina, São Paulo	
Melipona nebulosa (= Michmelia nebulosa)	Camargo, 1988		Acre, Amazonas, Pará	
Melipona paraensis (= Michmelia paraensis)	Ducke, 1916		Amapá, Amazonas, Pará	
Melipona rufiventris (= Michmelia rufiventris)	Lepeletier, 1836	check	Bahia, Goiás, Mato Grosso, Mato Grosso do Sul, Minas Gerais, Piauí, São Paulo	tujuba
Melipona scutellaris (= Michmelia scutellaris)	Latreille, 1811	check	Alagoas, Bahia, Ceará, Paraíba, Pernambuco, Rio Grande do Norte, Sergipe	
Melipona seminigra (= Michmelia seminigra)	Friese, 1903		Acre, Amazonas, Maranhão, Mato Grosso, Pará, Rondônia, Roraima, Tocantins	
Melipona titania (= Michmelia titania)	(Gribodo, 1893)		Amazonas	
Mourella caerulea	(Friese, 1900)		Paraná, Rio Grande do Sul, Santa Catarina	
Nannotrigona chapadana	(Schwarz, 1938)		Goiás, Mato Grosso	
Nannotrigona dutrae	(Friese, 1901)	check	Pará	
Nannotrigona melanocera	(Schwarz, 1938)		Acre, Amazonas	
Nannotrigona minuta	(Lepeletier, 1836)	check	Pará?	
Nannotrigona punctata	(Smith, 1854)		Amapá, Pará	
Nannotrigona schultzei	(Friese, 1901)		Amapá, Amazonas, Pará	
Nannotrigona testaceicornis	(Lepeletier, 1836)		Bahia, Espírito Santo, Goiás, Mato Grosso do Sul, Minas Gerais, Paraná, Rio de Janeiro, Rio Grande do Sul, Santa Catarina, São Paulo	
Nogueirapis butteli	(Friese, 1900)		Amazonas	
Nogueirapis minor	(Moure & Camargo, 1982)		Amapá, Amazonas	
Oxytrigona flaveola	(Friese, 1900)		Espírito Santo	
Oxytrigona ignis	Camargo, 1984	check	Amazonas, Maranhão, Pará	
Oxytrigona mulfordi	(Schwarz, 1948)		Acre, Rondônia	
Oxytrigona obscura	(Friese, 1900)		Amapá, Amazonas, Mato Grosso, Pará, Rondônia	
Oxytrigona tataira	(Smith, 1863)		Bahia, Espírito Santo, Mato Grosso do Sul, Minas Gerais, Paraná, Rio de Janeiro, Santa Catarina, São Paulo	tataíra
Paratrigona catabolonota	Camargo & Moure, 1994	check	Amazonas	
Paratrigona compsa	Camargo & Moure, 1994	check	Amazonas	
Paratrigona crassicornis	Camargo & Moure, 1994	check	Pará	
Paratrigona euxanthospila	Camargo & Moure, 1994	check	Amazonas	
Paratrigona femoralis	Camargo & Moure, 1994		Amapá	
Paratrigona haeckeli	(Friese, 1900)		Mato Grosso, Pará, Rondônia	
Paratrigona incerta	Camargo & Moure, 1994	check	Bahia, Minas Gerais, Paraíba	
Paratrigona lineata	(Lepeletier, 1836)		Bahia, Ceará, Goiás, Maranhão, Mato Grosso, Minas Gerais, Pará, Paraíba, Pernambuco, Paraná, Piauí, São Paulo, Tocantins	
Paratrigona lineatifrons	(Schwarz, 1938)	check	Amazonas, Pará	
Paratrigona melanaspis	Camargo & Moure, 1994	check	Amazonas	
Paratrigona nuda	(Schwarz, 1943)		Acre	
Paratrigona myrmecophila	Moure, 1989	check	Rondônia	
Paratrigona pacifica	(Schwarz, 1943)		Acre, Rondônia	
Paratrigona pannosa	Moure, 1989		Amapá, Amazonas, Pará	
Paratrigona peltata	(Spinola, 1853)	check	Maranhão, Pará	
Paratrigona prosopiformis	(Gribodo, 1893)		Acre, Amazonas, Pará, Rondônia	
Paratrigona subnuda	Moure, 1947	check	Bahia, Minas Gerais, Pará, Paraná, Rio de Janeiro, Rio Grande do Sul, Santa Catarina, São Paulo	
Partamona ailyae	Camargo, 1980		Acre, Amazonas, Ceará, Goiás, Maranhão, Mato Grosso, Mato Grosso do Sul, Minas Gerais, Pará, Piauí, Rondônia, São Paulo, Tocantins	
Partamona auripennis	Pedro & Camargo, 2003		Amapá, Amazonas, Pará	
Partamona batesi	Pedro & Camargo, 2003	check	Acre, Amazonas	
Partamona chapadicola	Pedro & Camargo, 2003	check	Maranhão, Pará, Pernambuco, Piauí, Tocantins	
Partamona combinata	Pedro & Camargo, 2003		Acre, Federal District, Goiás, Maranhão, Mato Grosso, Mato Grosso do Sul, Minas Gerais, Pará, Rondônia, São Paulo, Tocantins	
Partamona criptica	Pedro & Camargo, 2003	check	Espírito Santo, Minas Gerais, Rio de Janeiro, São Paulo	
Partamona cupira	(Smith, 1863)	check	Federal District, Goiás, Mato Grosso do Sul, Minas Gerais, São Paulo	
Partamona epiphytophila	Pedro & Camargo, 2003		Acre, Amazonas	
Partamona ferreirai	Pedro & Camargo, 2003		Amapá, Amazonas, Pará, Roraima	
Partamona gregaria	Pedro & Camargo, 2003	check	Amazonas, Pará	
Partamona helleri	(Friese, 1900)	check	Bahia, Espírito Santo, Minas Gerais, Paraná, Rio de Janeiro, Santa Catarina, São Paulo	
Partamona littoralis	Pedro & Camargo, 2003	check	Paraíba, Rio Grande do Norte	
Partamona mourei	Camargo, 1980		Amazonas, Pará, Roraima	
Partamona mulata	Moure, in Camargo, 1980		Mato Grosso, Mato Grosso do Sul	
Partamona nhambiquara	Pedro & Camargo, 2003		Goiás, Mato Grosso, Mato Grosso do Sul, Pará, Rondônia	
Partamona nigrior	Cockerell, 1925)		Roraima	
Partamona pearsoni	Pedro & Camargo, 2003		Amapá, Amazonas, Maranhão, Pará	
Partamona rustica	Pedro & Camargo, 2003	check	Bahia, Minas Gerais	
Partamona seridoensis	Pedro & Camargo, 2003	check	Ceará, Maranhão, Paraíba, Pernambuco, Rio Grande do Norte	
Partamona sooretamae	Pedro & Camargo, 2003	check	Bahia, Espírito Santo	
Partamona subtilis	Pedro & Camargo, 2003		Acre	
Partamona testacea	(Klug, 1807)		Acre, Amapá, Amazonas, Ceará, Maranhão, Pará, Rondônia	
Partamona vicina	Camargo, 1980		Acre, Amapá, Amazonas, Mato Grosso, Pará, Rondônia, Roraima	
Plebeia alvarengai	Moure, 1994	check	Amazonas, Mato Grosso, Pará, Rondônia	
Plebeia catamarcensis	(Holmberg, 1903)		Mato Grosso do Sul, Rio Grande do Sul	
Plebeia droryana	(Friese, 1900)		Bahia, Espírito Santo, Minas Gerais, Pará, Pernambuco, Rio de Janeiro, Rio Grande do Sul, Santa Catarina, São Paulo	
Plebeia emerina	(Friese, 1900)		Paraná, Rio Grande do Sul, Santa Catarina, São Paulo	
Plebeia flavocincta	(Cockerell, 1912)	check	Bahia, Paraíba, Pernambuco, Piauí	
Plebeia grapiuna	Melo & Costa, 2009	check	Bahia	
Plebeia julianii	Moure, 1962		Paraná	
Plebeia lucii	Moure, 2004	check	Espírito Santo, Minas Gerais	
Plebeia margaritae	Moure, 1962		Amazonas, Mato Grosso, Rondônia	
Plebeia meridionalis	(Ducke, 1916)		Espírito Santo, Minas Gerais, Paraná, Rio de Janeiro	
Plebeia minima	(Gribodo, 1893)		Acre, Amapá, Amazonas, Maranhão, Mato Grosso, Pará	
Plebeia mosquito	(Smith, 1863)	check	Minas Gerais, Rio de Janeiro	
Plebeia nigriceps	(Friese, 1901)		Paraná, Rio Grande do Sul, Santa Catarina, São Paulo	
Plebeia phrynostoma	Moure, 2004	check	Espírito Santo, Minas Gerais	
Plebeia poecilochroa	Moure & Camargo, 1993	check	Espírito Santo, Minas Gerais	
Plebeia remota	(Holmberg, 1903)		Espírito Santo, Minas Gerais, Paraná, Rio Grande do Sul, Santa Catarina, São Paulo	
Plebeia saiqui	(Friese, 1900)	check	Minas Gerais, Paraná, Rio Grande do Sul, Santa Catarina, São Paulo	
Plebeia variicolor	(Ducke, 1916)		Amazonas, Pará, Rondônia	
Plebeia wittmanni	Moure & Camargo, 1989		Rio Grande do Sul	
Ptilotrigona lurida	(Smith, 1854)		Acre, Amapá, Amazonas, Maranhão, Mato Grosso, Pará, Rondônia, Roraima	
Ptilotrigona pereneae	(Schwarz, 1943)		Acre, Amazonas	
Scaptotrigona affabra	(Moure, 1989)	check	Pará, Rondônia	
Scaptotrigona bipunctata	(Lepeletier, 1836)		Acre, Ceará, Maranhão, Minas Gerais, Pará, Paraná, Rio de Janeiro, Rio Grande do Sul, Santa Catarina	tubuna
Scaptotrigona depilis	(Moure, 1942)		Mato Grosso do Sul, Minas Gerais, Paraná, Rio Grande do Sul, São Paulo	
Scaptotrigona fulvicutis	(Moure, 1964)		Amapá, Amazonas	
Scaptotrigona polysticta	Moure, 1950		Acre, Goiás, Maranhão, Mato Grosso, Minas Gerais, Pará, Piauí, Rondônia, São Paulo, Tocantins	bijuí
Scaptotrigona postica	(Latreille, 1807)		Pará?	mandaguari
Scaptotrigona tricolorata	Camargo, 1988		Amazonas, Mato Grosso, Rondônia	
Scaptotrigona tubiba	(Smith, 1863)	check	Espírito Santo, Minas Gerais, Rio de Janeiro, São Paulo?	
Scaptotrigona xanthotricha	Moure, 1950	check	Bahia, Espírito Santo, Minas Gerais, Paraná, Rio de Janeiro, Santa Catarina, São Paulo	
Scaura atlantica	Melo, 2004	check	Bahia, Espírito Santo, Minas Gerais	
Scaura latitarsis	(Friese, 1900)		Acre, Amapá, Amazonas, Minas Gerais, Pará, Paraná, Rio de Janeiro, Rondônia, São Paulo	
Scaura longula	(Lepeletier, 1836)		Amapá, Amazonas, Bahia, Goiás, Maranhão, Mato Grosso, Minas Gerais, Pará, São Paulo	
Scaura tenuis	(Ducke, 1916)		Amazonas, Mato Grosso, Pará	
Schwarziana mourei	Melo, 2003		Goiás, Mato Grosso do Sul, Minas Gerais, Tocantins	
Schwarziana quadripunctata	(Lepeletier, 1836)		Bahia, Espírito Santo, Goiás, Minas Gerais, Paraná, Rio de Janeiro, Rio Grande do Sul, Santa Catarina, São Paulo	uruçu
Schwarzula coccidophila	Camargo & Pedro, 2002		Acre, Amazonas, Rondônia	
Schwarzula timida	(Silvestre, 1902)		Acre, Amazonas, Mato Grosso, Mato Grosso do Sul, Minas Gerais, Pará, Rondônia, São Paulo	
Tetragona beebei	(Schwarz, 1938)		Amazonas, Pará	
Tetragona clavipes	(Fabricius, 1804)		Roraima	borá
Tetragona dorsalis	(Smith, 1854)		Amapá, Amazonas, Ceará, Maranhão, Pará, Rondônia	
Tetragona elongata	Lepeletier & Serville, 1828		São Paulo, Minas Gerais	
Tetragona essequiboensis	(Schwarz, 1940)		Amazonas, Rondônia	
Tetragona goettei	(Friese, 1900)		Acre, Amazonas, Mato Grosso, Pará, Rondônia	
Tetragona handlirschii	(Friese, 1900)		Amapá, Amazonas, Pará, Roraima	
Tetragona kaieteurensis	(Schwarz, 1938)		Amazonas, Pará	
Tetragona quadrangula		check	Goiás, Maranhão, Minas Gerais, Mato Grosso, Pará, São Paulo, Tocantins	
Tetragona truncata	Moure, 1971		Amazonas, Goiás, Maranhão, Mato Grosso, Pará, Rondônia	
Tetragonisca angustula	(Latreille, 1811)			jataí, jatí
Tetragonisca fiebrigi	(Schwarz, 1938)		Mato Grosso, Mato Grosso do Sul, Paraná, Rio Grande do Sul, São Paulo	
Tetragonisca weyrauchi	(Schwarz, 1943)		Acre, Mato Grosso, Rondônia	
Trichotrigona extranea	Camargo & Moure, 1983	check	Amazonas	
Trigona albipennis	Almeida, 1995		Acre, Amazonas, Mato Grosso, Pará, Rondônia	
Trigona amalthea	(Olivier, 1789)		Amazonas, Mato Grosso, Rondônia	
Trigona amazonensis	(Ducke, 1916)		Acre, Amazonas, Mato Grosso, Pará, Rondônia, Tocantins	
Trigona branneri	Cockerell, 1912		Amazonas, Goiás, Maranhão, Mato Grosso, Pará, Rondônia, Tocantins	
Trigona braueri	Friese, 1900		Bahia, Espírito Santo, Paraná, Rio de Janeiro, São Paulo	
Trigona chanchamayoensis	Schwarz, 1948			
Trigona cilipes	(Fabricius, 1804)		Acre, Amapá, Amazonas, Goiás, Minas Gerais, Mato Grosso, Pará, Rondônia, Roraima, São Paulo	
Trigona crassipes	(Fabricius, 1793)		Amapá, Amazonas, Mato Grosso, Pará	
Trigona dallatorreana	Friese, 1900		Amapá, Amazonas, Maranhão, Mato Grosso, Pará, Rondônia, Tocantins	
Trigona dimidiata	Smith, 1854		Amazonas, Mato Grosso, Pará, Rondônia	
Trigona guianae	Cockerell, 1910		Acre, Amapá, Amazonas, Ceará, Mato Grosso, Pará, Paraíba, Rondônia, Tocantins	
Trigona hyalinata	(Lepeletier, 1836)		Bahia, Federal District, Goiás, Maranhão, Mato Grosso, Mato Grosso do Sul, Minas Gerais, Pará, Piauí, São Paulo, Tocantins	
Trigona hypogea	Silvestri, 1902		Amazonas, Maranhão, Mato Grosso, Pará, São Paulo	
Trigona lacteipennis	Friese, 1900		Acre, Amazonas, Goiás, Mato Grosso, Pará, Rondônia, Roraima	
Trigona pallens	(Fabricius, 1798)		Acre, Amapá, Amazonas, Goiás, Maranhão, Pará, Rondônia, Roraima, Tocantins	
Trigona pellucida	Cockerell, 1912	check	Mato Grosso, Pará, Rondônia	
Trigona recursa	Smith, 1863		Acre, Amazonas, Ceará, Goiás, Maranhão, Mato Grosso, Minas Gerais, Pará, Piauí, Rondônia, São Paulo, Tocantins	
Trigona sesquipedalis	Almeida, 1984		Amapá	
Trigona spinipes	(Fabricius, 1793)		Alagoas, Bahia, Ceará, Espírito Santo, Goiás, Maranhão, Mato Grosso, Mato Grosso do Sul, Minas Gerais, Pará, Paraíba, Paraná, Pernambuco, Piauí, Rio de Janeiro, Rio Grande do Norte, Rio Grande do Sul, Santa Catarina, São Paulo, Sergipe, Tocantins	irapuá, arapuá
Trigona truculenta	Almeida, 1984		Acre, Amapá, Amazonas, Bahia, Goiás, Maranhão, Mato Grosso, Mato Grosso do Sul, Minas Gerais, Pará, Rondônia, São Paulo	
Trigona williana	Friese, 1900		Acre, Amapá, Amazonas, Maranhão, Mato Grosso, Pará, Rondônia, Roraima	
Trigonisca bidentata	Albuquerque & Camargo, 2007	check	Rondônia	
Trigonisca ceophloei	(Schwarz, 1938)		Amazonas	
Trigonisca dobzhanskyi	(Moure, 1950)		Amazonas, Pará	
Trigonisca duckei	(Friese, 1900)		Amazonas, Ceará, Maranhão, Mato Grosso, Pará, Roraima	
Trigonisca extrema	Albuquerque & Camargo, 2007	check	Amazonas	
Trigonisca flavicans	(Moure, 1950)	check	Amazonas	
Trigonisca fraissei	(Friese, 1901)	check	Amazonas, Mato Grosso, Pará, Rondônia	
Trigonisca graeffei	(Friese, 1900)		Amazonas	
Trigonisca hirticornis	Albuquerque & Camargo, 2007	check	Rondônia	
Trigonisca intermedia	Moure, 1900	check	Bahia, Espírito Santo, Mato Grosso, Minas Gerais, São Paulo	
Trigonisca meridionalis	Albuquerque & Camargo, 2007	check	Maranhão, Mato Grosso, Minas Gerais, Pará, São Paulo	
Trigonisca nataliae	(Moure, 1950)	check	Maranhão, Mato Grosso, Pará, Rondônia	
Trigonisca pediculana	(Fabricius, 1804)		Bahia, Ceará, Maranhão, Paraíba	
Trigonisca unidentata	Albuquerque & Camargo, 2007	check	Amazonas	
Trigonisca variegatifrons	Albuquerque & Camargo, 2007	check	Mato Grosso, Pará, Rondônia	
Trigonisca vitrifrons	Albuquerque & Camargo, 2007	check	Amazonas, Pará	

== List of genera ==
Genus	Total number of species	Species occurring in Brazil [+ undescribed forms]
Aparatrigona	2	1
Camargoia	3	3
Celetrigona	4	4
Cephalotrigona	5	2 [+1]
Dolichotrigona	10	7
Duckeola	2	2
Friesella	1	1 [+1]
Frieseomelitta	16	13 [+5]
Geotrigona	22	10 [+1]
Lestrimelitta	23	14
Leurotrigona	4	3
Melipona (sensu lato)	74	40
Eomelipona (= Melipona)	(15)	10 [+2]
Melikerria (= Melipona)	(10)	5 [+1]
Melipona (sensu stricto)	(13)	5 [+1]
Michmelia (= Melipona)	(36)	20 [+10]
Meliwillea	1	0
Mourella	1	1
Nannotrigona	10	7 [+1]
Nogueirapis	4	2 [+1]
Oxytrigona	11	5 [+5]
Parapartamona	7	0
Paratrigona	32	16 [+3]
Paratrigonoides	1	0
Partamona	32	23 [+3]
Plebeia	40	19 [+10]
Proplebeia	4	0
Ptilotrigona	3	2
Scaptotrigona	22	9 [+10]
Scaura	5	4 [+2]
Schwarziana	2	2 [+2]
Schwarzula	2	2
Tetragona	13	10 [+5]
Tetragonisca	4	3 [+2]
Trichotrigona	1	1 [+1]
Trigona	32	21 [+12]
Trigonisca	25	16 [+10]
Total	418	244 [+89]

== See also ==
- Wildlife of Brazil

== Bibliography ==
- Imperatriz-Fonseca, Vera Lúcia; Alves, Denise Araújo, eds. (2020). Stingless bees of Pará: based on the scientific expeditions of João M. F. Camargo. Belém, Pará: Instituto Tecnológico Vale (ITV). ISBN 978-65-990228-2-1.
- Posey, Darrell A. 1986. Etnoentomologia de tribos indígenas da Amazônia. In: Ribeiro, Darcy (editor); Ribeiro, Berta G. (coord.). Suma Etnológica Brasileira, Vol. 1: Etnobiologia, p. 95-99. Petrópolis: Vozes, Finep.
- dos Santos GM, Antonini Y (2008). "The traditional knowledge on stingless bees (Apidae: Meliponina) used by the Enawene-Nawe tribe in western Brazil". Journal of Ethnobiology and Ethnomedicine. 4 19. doi:10.1186/1746-4269-4-19. PMC 2562997. PMID 18793393.
