= Tiúba =

Tiúba may refer to:

- Tiúba River in Brazil
- Melipona compressipes, a species of stingless bee commonly known as tiúba in Brazil
