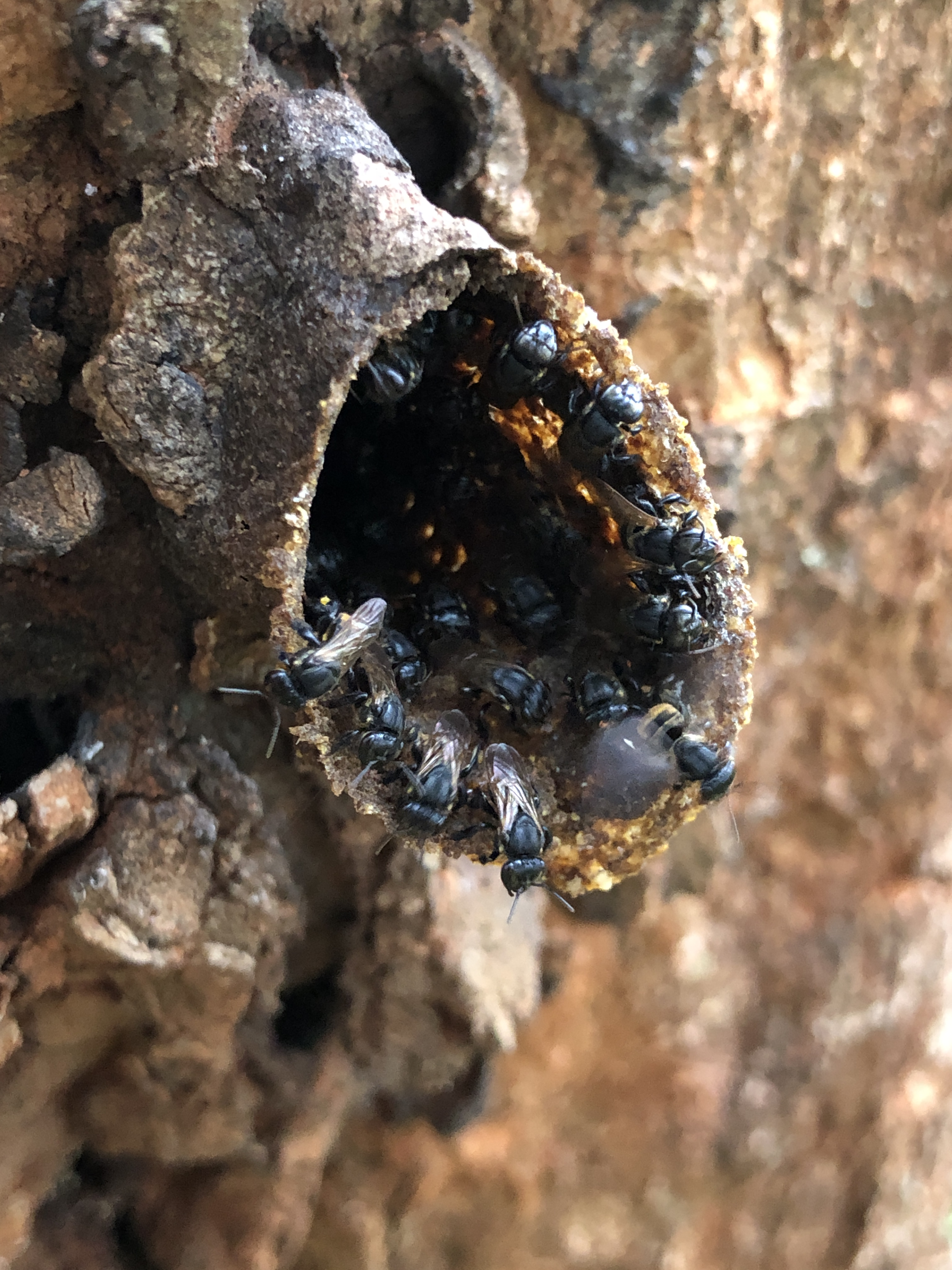
- entrance to the colony

Scientific classification
- Kingdom: Animalia
- Phylum: Arthropoda
- Clade: Pancrustacea
- Class: Insecta
- Order: Hymenoptera
- Family: Apidae
- Genus: Scaptotrigona
- Species: S. postica

Binomial name
- Scaptotrigona postica (Latreille, 1807)
- S. postica distribution

= Scaptotrigona postica =

Species of bee

Scaptotrigona postica (also known locally in Brazil as mandaguari) is a species of stingless bee that lives mainly in Brazil. It is a eusocial bee in the tribe Meliponini. S. postica is one of 25 species in the genus Scaptotrigona and is a critical pollinator of the tropical rain forests of Brazil. They construct their nests in hollowed sections of tree trunks, allowing for effective guarding at the nest entrance. This species shows colony structure similar to most members of the Meliponini tribe with three roles within the colony: queen, worker, and male. S. postica individuals have different forms of communication, from cuticular hydrocarbons to pheromones and scent trails. Communication is especially useful during worker foraging for nectar and pollen through the Brazilian tropical rainforests. S. postica is a very important pollinator of the Brazilian tropical rainforests and is widely appreciated for its honey. Stingless bees account for approximately 30% of all pollination of the Brazilian Caatinga and Pantanal ecosystems and up to 90% of the pollination for many species of the Brazilian Atlantic Forest and the Amazon.

== Taxonomy and phylogeny ==
Scaptotrigona postica is one of the 25 species in the genus Scaptotrigona, a eusocial genus of bees. It was first described by Pierre André Latreille in 1807. In the past, it has also been called Melipona postica, Trigona postica and Trigona rustica. This bee is a member of many taxonomic subgroups, including the subclass pterygota (winged insects), suborder apocrita, and subfamily Apinae (stingless bees). These groups of bees are winged, have a social hierarchy, and do not have defensive stingers. Instead they bite and try to enter in body orifices as nose and ears. This species can be very aggressive against humans that approach its nest. Other similar species in this genus include Scaptotrigona hellwegeri, Scaptotrigona mexicana and Scaptotrigona pectoralis.

== Queens, workers, and males ==
Scaptotrigona postica are medium-sized, averaging 1.2 cm in length and cross-sectional area of 5.3 mm^{2}. They appear dark gray with some sections of dark yellow in color, with black eyes.

Queens are the largest bees in the nest, averaging 38–50 mg, and are identifiable by their swollen abdomens. Also, they have more of the yellow coloring than the workers and drones. There is one queen per colony, but once virgin queens are born, they are tolerated for 15 days on average until they either leave the colony or are killed. S. postica queens cannot independently colonize, instead needing a group of workers to help build a new colony. While virgin queen bees must leave the colony, a queen holds her position for several years

Workers are the smallest bees in the nest, weighing between 15–22 mg and are black in color. They assume different roles in the nest based on their age.

0 days old = produce wax
16–20 days old = provision cell broods
21–35 days old = colony cleaning
21–45 days old = nectar reception and dehydration
31–40 days old = colony defense
26–60 days old = foraging

Drones are almost identical in size as the workers, but weigh slightly more. They weigh on average 17–30 mg and are black in color. The drones are the male bees hatched from unfertilized eggs. Their role is to mate with the queen to produce female bees. They do not participate in many other activities.

== Nest ==
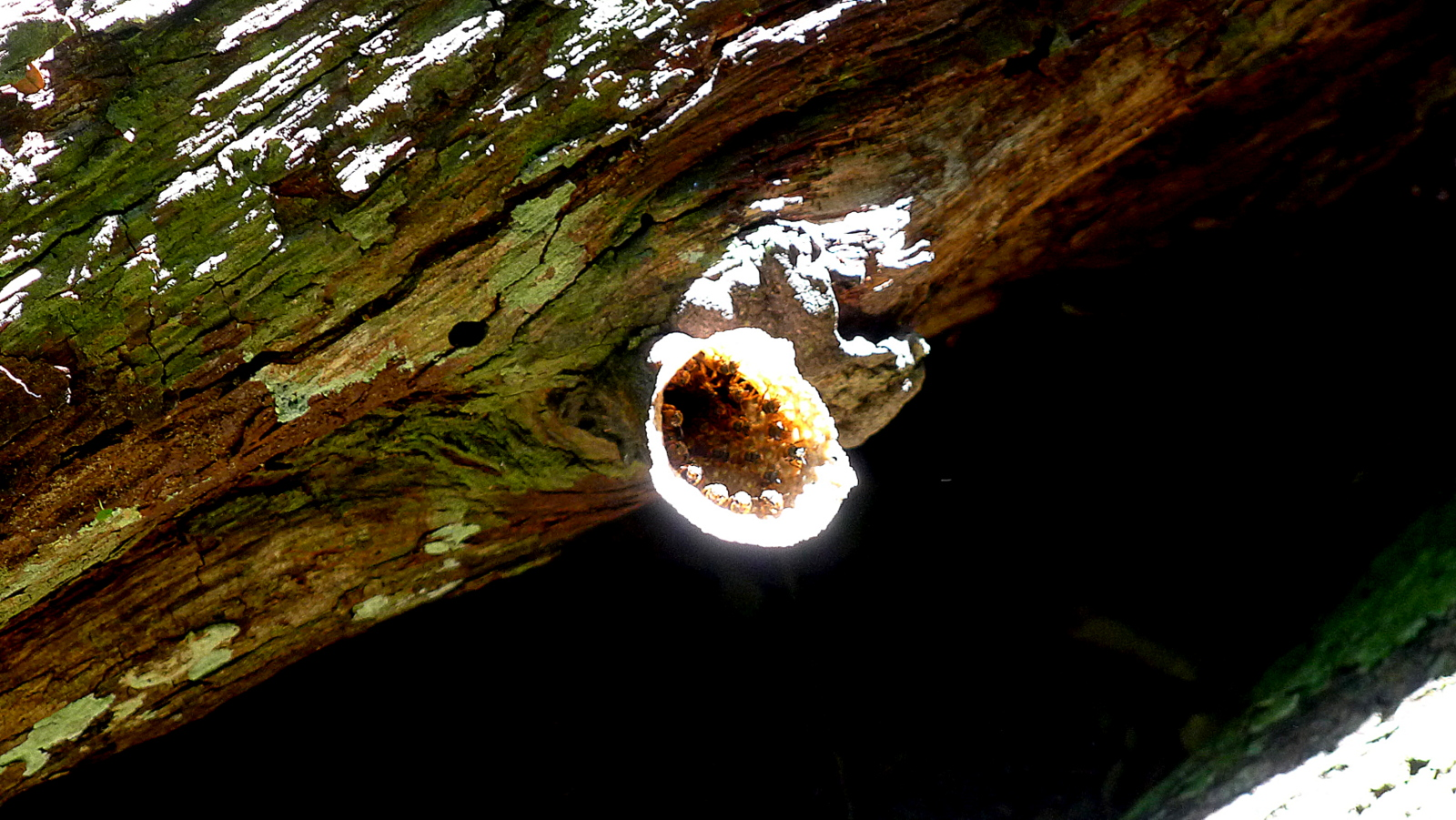
Exterior of an S. postica nest

Scaptotrigona postica nest in partially hollow sections of trees in the tropical rain forests of Brazil. The nests range from 3–7 meters above ground with a canopy overhead, approximately 15–20 meters above the nest. One of the common trees nested by S. postica is the Caryocar brasiliense, also known as the cerrado-tree.

The nest consists of inner brood cells and a short entrance tube. The brood cells are sometimes compacted into combs and large wax pots for storage of honey/pollen. The cells are composed of cerumen, are vertical in shape, and open at the top of the cell. The entrance to the nest has an average cross-sectional area of 143.5 mm^{2} and is guarded by about 8 guards. These bees stand at attention near the entrance, occasionally flying back and forth in front of the entrance.

Each nest contains one colony of S. postica. It carries between 2,000–50,000 individuals, averaging 10,000 bees per colony.

== Distribution and habitat ==
Scaptotrigona postica is found in the southern, central-western, and northern regions of Brazil as the dense tropical rain forests provide ideal nesting locations. These bees maintain an average nest temperature of 32˚C, which is a few degrees above the average temperature of the Brazilian rain forests (27˚C). With the addition of an insulating layer, the nest temperature can be easily maintained in this environment. S. postica has also been found in Peru but is much more common in Brazil.

== Colony cycle ==
=== Initiation ===
Worker bee swarming initiates a new colony. These bees occasionally invade the nests of nearby bee species. New nests house up to three virgin queens during initiation. The queen arrives at the new colony within 5 days of the beginning of swarming. While there can be three virgin queens to begin a nest, the workers will kill two of them to leave a single, reproductive queen for the nest.

=== Growth ===
The growth of the colony depends on nest productivity. During colonization, productivity is low, restricting population growth. As productivity increases, colonies begin male production, increasing overall population growth until reaching an average size of 10,000 individuals. This growth is season dependent. During the rainy season, colony growth rate rises due to increased resource availability.

=== Lifespan ===
The average lifespan of S. postica workers ranges from 30 to 40 days. They have a low mortality rate during the initial stages of life because they do not leave the nest. Death of individuals becomes significant after approximately 15 days and continues increasing until about 40 days. Unlike the worker bees, the queen bees can live for multiple years, averaging a longer lifespan.

=== Male Production ===
Male production depends on the season. Production of males is restricted during food shortages, creating short periods of male production with longer periods of female production. Males are produced by unfertilized eggs laid by the workers.

== Communication ==
Scaptotrigona postica communicate to recognize nest-mates, identify the caste of any individual bee, locate food, and signal danger.

=== Cuticular hydrocarbons ===
Cuticular hydrocarbons are waxy coatings on S. postica bodies that signal the hierarchy and original colony of any bee. They are also important anti-desiccants. Workers have cuticular hydrocarbons lacking oxygens while the drones have more oxygenated compounds. Hydrocarbons also provide social dominance and fertility cues that are important when determining the queen during colonization.

=== Scent markers ===
Scaptotrigona postica workers leave scent paths between the nest and food sources, facilitating the successful foraging of others. The threshold distance from food to nest for the scent trail is 11–12 metres (36–39 ft), although the flight radius from the nest is larger (600 metres (2,000 ft)). These marks last about 15 minutes before dissipating. Workers follow the tracks of other populations of the same species, increasing foraging success of both colonies. These scent substances are composed of two different ketones: 2-heptanone and 2-nonanone.

=== Communication for reproduction ===
The specific scents that attract drones to virgin queens prior to reproduction are 2-alcohols and 2-ketones. The 2-alcohols attract the males from long distances to the virgin queen, while 2-ketones induce copulatory attempts when the male is closer to the queen. These compounds have been found in the queens’ mandibular glands but are absent in those of the worker female S. postica

== Reproduction ==
Queen bees are the colony's reproductive heads. While there is only one queen per colony, workers produce males without mating. However, these hemizygous individuals will always be male. So, eggs can be laid by the unfertilized females (workers) or the fertilized females (queens).

=== Mating ===
Virgin queens are most attractive to workers. Males are attracted to the queens via olfactory signals composed of hexyl hexanoate. These scents indicate the queen's reproductive status. S. postica males respond to the pheromones of virgin queens and congregate in groups of variable size at the entrance of the nest. These groups can be from just a few individuals up to thousands of S. postica males. The individuals of the group become a compact swarm as some drones sit on the backs of others. While the drones compete to mate with the virgin queen, they do not act aggressively towards each other. These individuals will quickly disperse upon any intrusion, extra commotion, or disturbance due to an alarm pheromone that spread from individual to individual. Queens make one mating flight. The males lose their genitalia during mating, only inseminating one female. Flights generally occur during the afternoon, with low flight activity in the morning hours. When mating with the queen, the S. postica drones assume an upright posture, antennae stretched as far and outward as possible. The queen will store the spermatozoa, returning to the nest to lay her eggs which she fertilizes in the laying process with remarkably few sperm per egg.

=== Genetic relatedness ===
The genetic relatedness of individuals depends on the egg. The worker eggs are hemizygous, only containing genetic information from the worker. Thus, all offspring from one worker are genetically identical, also known as "full sisters". The fertilized eggs of the queen contain genetic information from the queen and from one of the up to six mates of the female. This increases the genetic variance in the offspring. Furthermore, the drones mating with the queen are unrelated to her due to drifting of drones between colonies. This decreases the genetic relatedness between fertilized offspring. The overall genetic relatedness within a colony for S. postica is between approximately .70 and .85, averaging around .80. This suggests that while mainly workers produce males, queens also produce male offspring, not entirely losing in the conflict between workers and queens for male production.

The costs of hemizygous male production include inbreeding due to decreased genetic variance and producing nonviable or sterile males. To prevent this, drones drift between colonies. However, there are few populations within the flight radius, so drone genotypic diversity is low.

=== Sex determination ===
Sex is determined through controlled fertilization of eggs. Drones are the fertilizers of the nest and will only fertilize the eggs laid by the queen of the colony. These fertilized eggs are heterozygous with complementary sex-determining loci and will always become female. Since drones do not fertilize the worker bees, the worker eggs are haploid, and they produce male offspring. However, workers are not always laying eggs. Thus, male production is limited to certain periods of time (see Male Production). While the workers of S. postica produce approximately 95% of all males, the queen still produces that remaining 5% of males. The queen will release some haploid eggs among her main diploid eggs. However, after the queen has produced a certain small number of male offspring, she will revert to producing females only.

=== Worker-queen conflict ===
Conflict exists between the egg-laying females in the colony. Workers can only produce males while the queen can produce females and males. Workers lay their eggs in cells after the queen has laid hers setting up a larval competition. Worker eggs are larger, more rounded, and laid on the upper inside wall of cells. If the queen does not re-check the cells, the eggs of the workers will produce males. However, if other workers or the queen checks on a cell and sees the unfertilized egg, they will eat it. This shows a competition between the egg-laying females of the colony. Furthermore, there is conflict between the larvae of both the worker and the queen. If there are two eggs in a cell, the larvae from the worker egg will develop more rapidly and devour that of the queen egg. The reciprocal has not been observed.

== Thermoregulation ==
Nest location helps regulate nest temperature. However, S. postica workers can help warm or cool the nest. At low temperatures, the bees mass incubate the brood chamber, increasing temperature. Cerumen coverings, produced by workers, insulate cold spots. During overheating, bees evacuate the nest and reduce the temperature by fanning. There is direct cooling via evaporation due to nest location. The temperature homeostasis is important because of the hot climate of the tropical Brazilian rain forests.

== Diet ==
In a study carried out in São Paulo, the main plant used by S. postica for both pollen and nectar was Eucalyptus, a popular introduced tree in the area. Pollen grains containing protein from Eucalyptus could be found in the midguts of all members of the S. postica colony. These pollen grains are digested fully between 6 and 28 hours. The protein requirements for S. postica differ based on the role and age of the individual. Worker and queen bees have similar protein requirements (between 20 and 200 pollen grains). Larvae ingest a significantly higher amount of pollen (between 1000 and 2300 pollen grains), as the protein is essential during development.

== Predators and defense ==
=== Predation ===
A main predator of S. postica is the sphecid wasp Trachypus boharti. This wasp is also found in Brazil and exclusively preys on the males of S. postica. The wasps hover near the entrance of the nest in groups averaging to 11 wasps in a group. These wasps capture up to 50 S. postica drones per day close to the entrance of the nest. The drones hover at the entrance of the colony, waiting for emerging female queens to mate with. It captures the individual and preserves it using a secretion from the wasp's post-pharyngeal glands. Fortunately for S. postica, these predation attempts are generally unsuccessful as T. boharti only captures a male drone 7% of the time. Most of these failed attempts are due to conflict with other wasps (interfering with the flight path, collisions, and competition). Furthermore, if a wasp captures a different individual of the colony (mainly all female bees), it immediately releases the individual with no harm done. While the T. boharti only predate the drones of S. postica, they do not seek specifically those individuals, rather they are attracted to all S. postica and select their prey after capture.

=== Defense Methods ===
The defense for S. postica nests is to have, on average, 8 workers guarding the front of the nest at all times. Sometimes the guards are sitting nearby, and at others, they fly back and forth across the entrance. These bees are part of the tribe Meliponini, which do not have stingers. However, S. postica guard bees have been observed to bite nest intruders as they alert the other colony members through pheromone signaling. These alarm pheromones contain 2-heptonal and other ketones as active substances. S. postica workers also will display a specific leg posture when other members of the nest or other organisms attempt to take cerumen from the corbiculae (structures located on the hind legs functioning as pollen baskets).

== Human importance ==
=== Pollination ===
Scaptotrigona postica are pollinators for plants in the Brazilian rainforests. S. postica exploit a smaller number of the many plant species. The main flower type visited by this species on the campus of São Paulo University was that of Eucalyptus, making up over 45% of the pollen collected by the workers. Some secondary sources for pollen and honey were Mimosa daleoides, Lithraea molleoides, Leucaena leucocephala, and Piptadenia gonacantha.

As pollination is vital for the plants in the Brazilian rainforests, some plant species have developed pheromone mimicry to attract the drones of S. postica. Virgin S. postica queens have a mixture of 2-alkanols in the pheromones that attract the drones for mating. Many Orchidaceae species common in Brazilian rainforests, such as Mormolyca ringens, have a similar mixture of alkanes/alkenes that will attract those same drones to the flower. Following the attempted "copulation" of the drone with the flower, the chemical composition of the flower's mimicked pheromone changes so that it does not attract any more males.

=== Pesticides ===
One insecticide in Brazil is Fipronil which inhibits GABA receptors of the nervous system, resulting in seizures, paralysis, and death. S. postica is in contact with Fipronil which is extremely toxic to bees. Compared to other bees, S. postica tolerates higher doses of Fipronil, but the toxicity is still high. Another toxic insecticide widely used in Brazil is Imidacloprid. Similar to Fipronil, S. postica are relatively more tolerant of this insecticide. The route of intoxication is very important in determining how lethal Imidacloprid is to the S. postica bees. Imidacloprid is significantly more toxic to S. postica through topical exposure compared to consumption of the insecticide. The increase in use of pesticides could cause a decline in pollinators like S. postica hurting the environments of Brazil.

=== Antiviral properties ===
Scaptotrigona postica creates propolis with plant secretions, saliva, and wax. It seals the nest but also has significant antiviral properties. The propolis from S. postica reduces production of pocornavirus 64-fold, production of influenza virus 32-fold, and production of measles virus 8-fold. It can decrease the replication of the rubella virus at a rate of 10^{3}.
