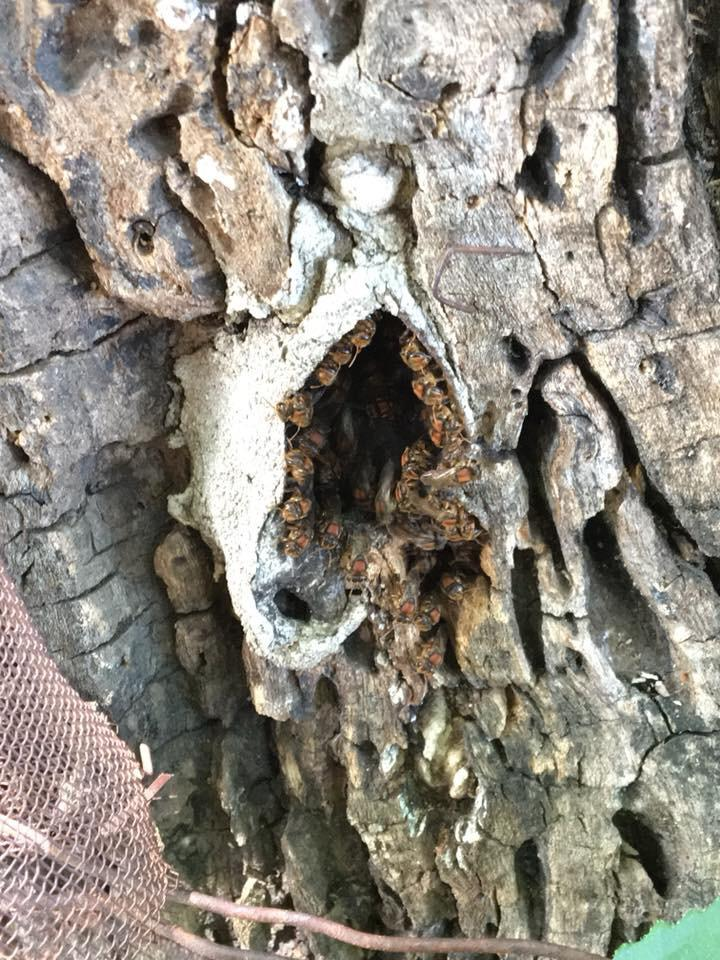

Scientific classification
- Kingdom: Animalia
- Phylum: Arthropoda
- Class: Insecta
- Order: Hymenoptera
- Family: Apidae
- Genus: Scaptotrigona
- Species: S. hellwegeri

Binomial name
- Scaptotrigona hellwegeri Friese, 1879

= Scaptotrigona hellwegeri =

Species of bee

Scaptotrigona hellwegeri, the red stingless bee, is a species of stingless bee endemic to Mexico from the Apidae family.

== Description ==
Like its relatives in the genus Scaptotrigona, S. hellwegeri lacks a stinger and ranges in length from 47 to 51 millimeters in adults. Its thorax is usually reddish-orange with a black area on the back and black lines on the underside. The abdomen is usually yellow/brown/honey-colored with black stripes. Its legs are orange with black and yellow markings.

== Distribution and habitat ==
The stingless bee lives in hives that it forms in tree hollows and usually has a preference for pollinating capulincillo, periquillo, cascarillo de montaña, crucecillo, cuaulote, cascalote, palo de corazón bonito, arrayán guayabillo and caobillas, although more than 160 species from more than 50 families of plants have been identified that the stingless bee can pollinate.

It is an endemic species of Mexico, which has been observed in the states of Durango, Sinaloa, Nayarit, Jalisco, Michoacán, State of Mexico, Federal District, Morelos, Puebla, Guerrero and Oaxaca.

== Human uses ==
Scaptotrigona hellwegeri is used in the practice of meliponiculture, that is, the raising of stingless bees for the use of their wax and honey, to which medicinal properties are attributed. In the Oaxaca region, S. hellwegeri is commonly known as "cucu de mamey" (mamey bee) because its honey has a scent similar to mamey zapote, in addition to the orange color of its body. Among the species of agricultural importance that the cucu de mamey pollinates are: achiote, leme, coconut, mango, capulincillo, rambutan, avocado, chayote and jocote.
