= Trigona dimidiata =

Scientific classification
- Domain: Eukaryota
- Kingdom: Animalia
- Phylum: Arthropoda
- Class: Insecta
- Order: Hymenoptera
- Family: Apidae
- Genus: Trigona
- Species: T. dimidiata

Binomial name
- Trigona dimidiata Smith, 1854

Species of bee

Trigona dimidiata is a species of eusocial stingless bee in the family Apidae and tribe Meliponini.
