= Melipona seminigra =

Scientific classification
- Kingdom: Animalia
- Phylum: Arthropoda
- Clade: Pancrustacea
- Class: Insecta
- Order: Hymenoptera
- Family: Apidae
- Genus: Melipona
- Species: M. seminigra

Binomial name
- Melipona seminigra Friese, 1903

Synonyms
- Michmelia seminigra

Species of bee

Melipona seminigra, commonly known as uruçu-boca-de-renda (literally "laced-mouth uruçu" bee in Brazilian Portuguese), is a species of eusocial stingless bee in the family Apidae and tribe Meliponini.
