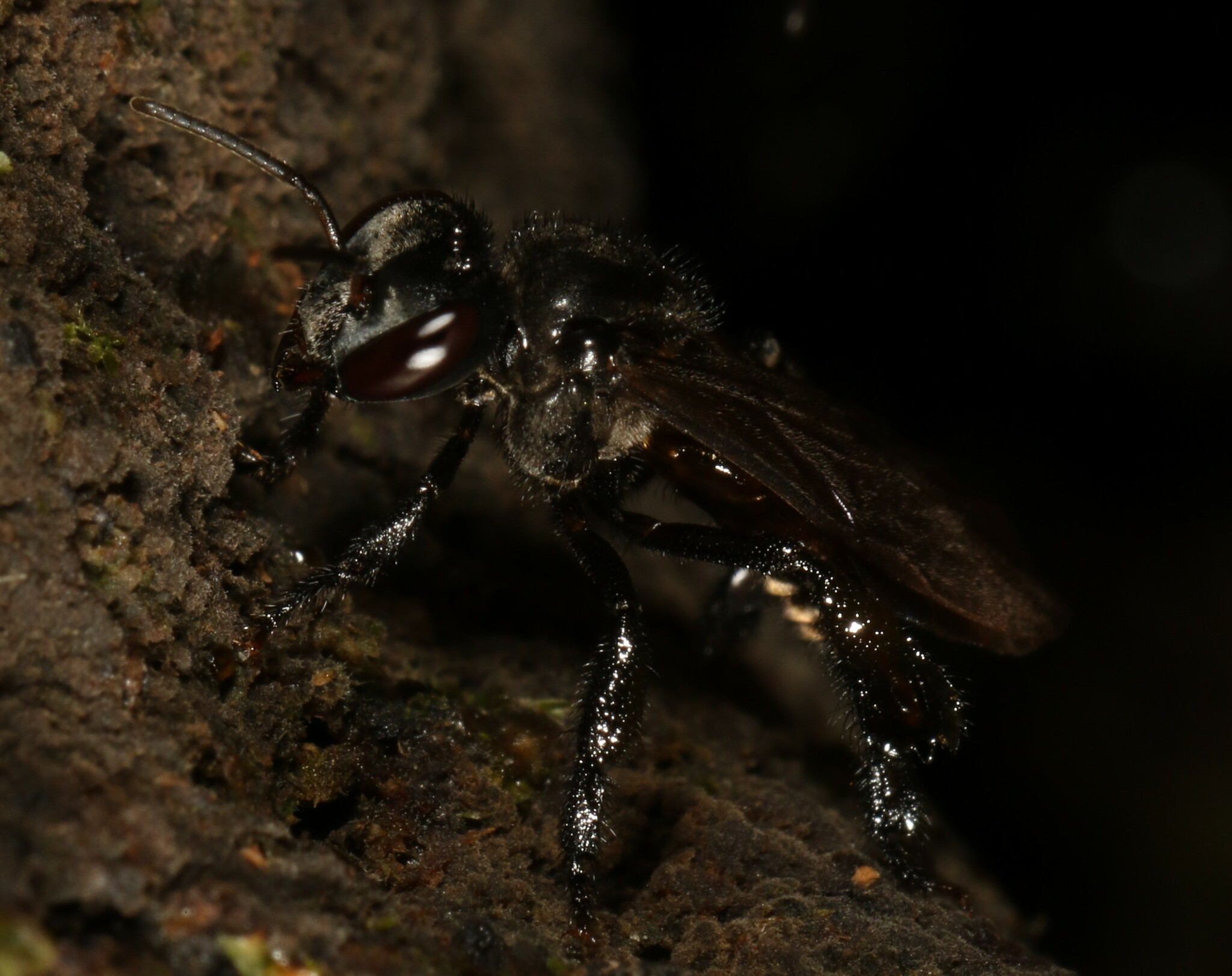

Scientific classification
- Kingdom: Animalia
- Phylum: Arthropoda
- Clade: Pancrustacea
- Class: Insecta
- Order: Hymenoptera
- Family: Apidae
- Genus: Trigona
- Species: T. guianae

Binomial name
- Trigona guianae Cockerell, 1910

= Trigona guianae =

Species of bee

Trigona guianae is a species of eusocial stingless bee in the family Apidae and tribe Meliponini.
