= Paratrigonoides =

Scientific classification
- Domain: Eukaryota
- Kingdom: Animalia
- Phylum: Arthropoda
- Class: Insecta
- Order: Hymenoptera
- Family: Apidae
- Genus: Paratrigonoides; Camargo & Roubik, 2005
- Species: P. mayri

Binomial name
- Paratrigonoides mayri Camargo & Roubik, 2005

Genus of bees

Paratrigonoides is a monotypic genus of bees belonging to the family Apidae, containing a single species, Paratrigonoides mayri.

The species is found in Colombia.
