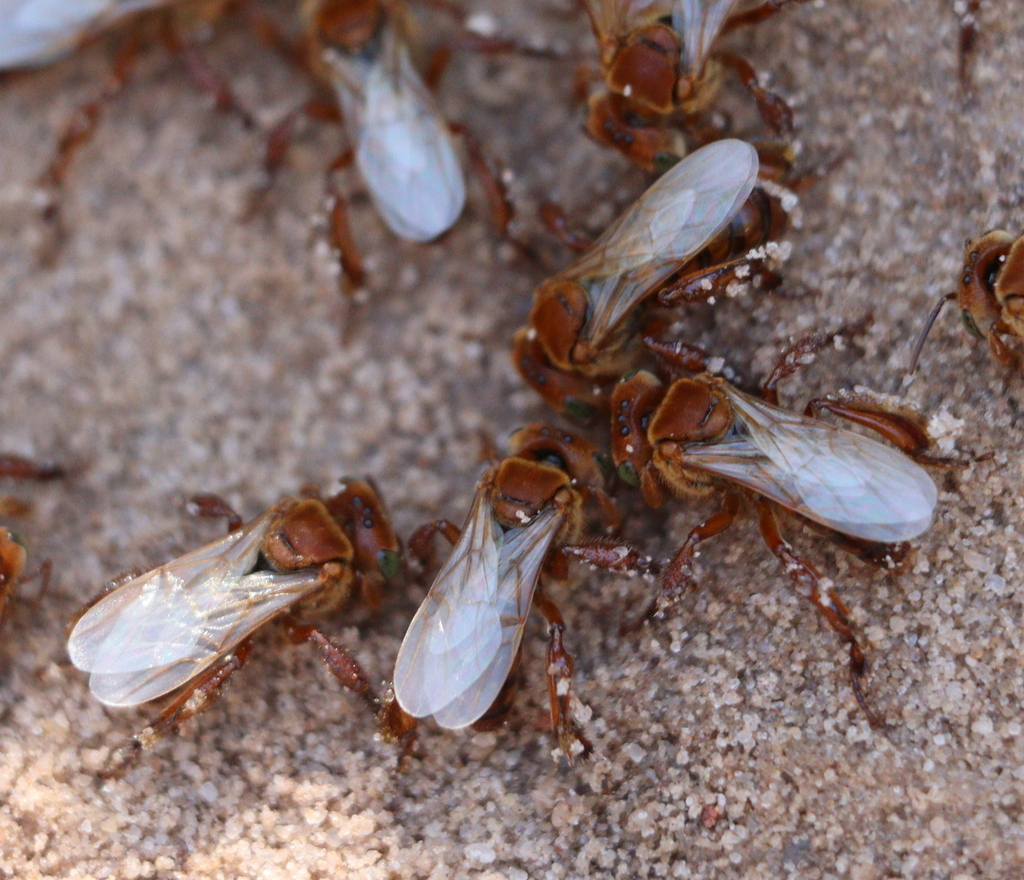

Scientific classification
- Kingdom: Animalia
- Phylum: Arthropoda
- Class: Insecta
- Order: Hymenoptera
- Family: Apidae
- Genus: Trigona
- Species: T. dallatorreana

Binomial name
- Trigona dallatorreana Friese, 1900

= Trigona dallatorreana =

Species of bee

Trigona dallatorreana, known as irapuá-vermelha ("red irapuá bee") in Brazil, is a species of eusocial stingless bee in the family Apidae and tribe Meliponini.
