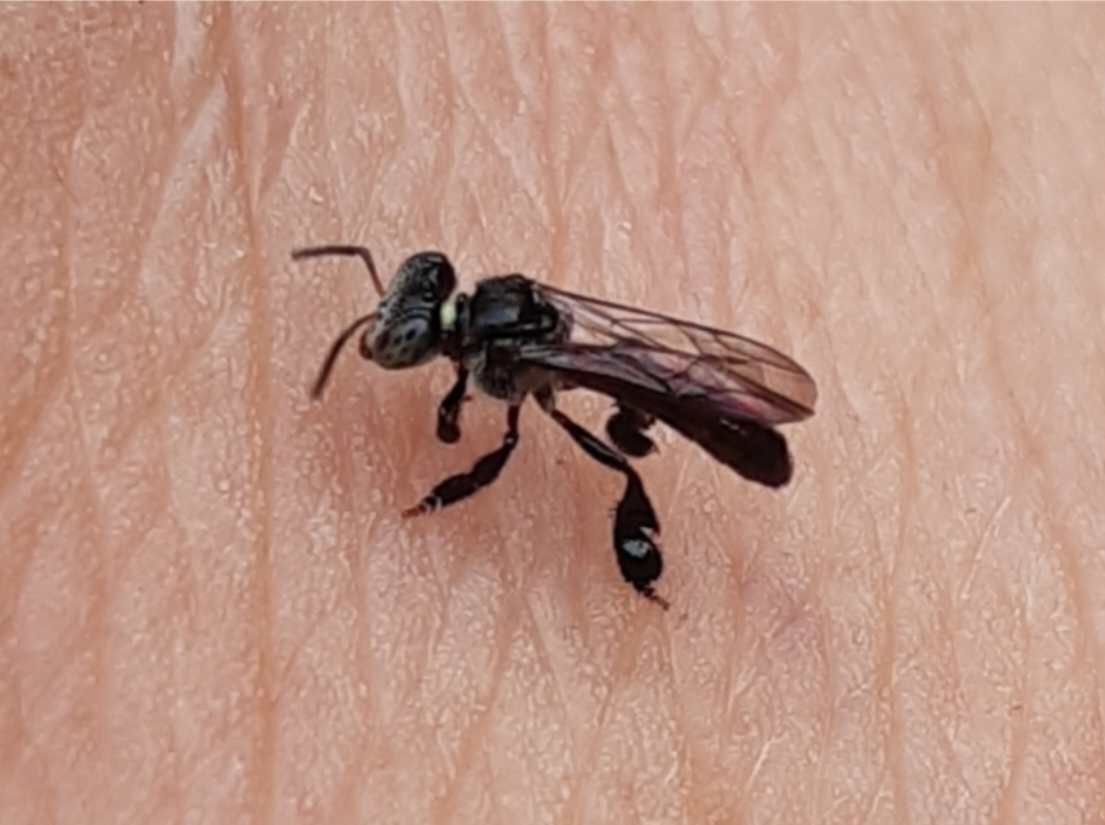
- Scaura latitarsis

Scientific classification
- Kingdom: Animalia
- Phylum: Arthropoda
- Class: Insecta
- Order: Hymenoptera
- Family: Apidae
- Tribe: Meliponini
- Genus: Scaura; Schwarz, 1938

Synonyms
- Schwarzula Moure, 1946

= Scaura =

Genus of bees

Scaura is a genus of bees belonging to the family Apidae.

The species of this genus are found in South America.

Species:

- Scaura amazonica Nogueira, F.F.Oliveira & M.L.Oliveira, 2019
- Scaura argyrea (Cockerell, 1912)
- Scaura aspera Nogueira & Oliveira, 2019
- Scaura atlantica Melo, 2004
- Scaura cearensis Nogueira, Santos Júnior & Oliveira, 2019
- Scaura coccidophila (Camargo & Pedro, 2002)
- Scaura latitarsis (Friese, 1900)
- Scaura longula (Lepeletier, 1836)
- Scaura timida (Silvestri, 1902)
