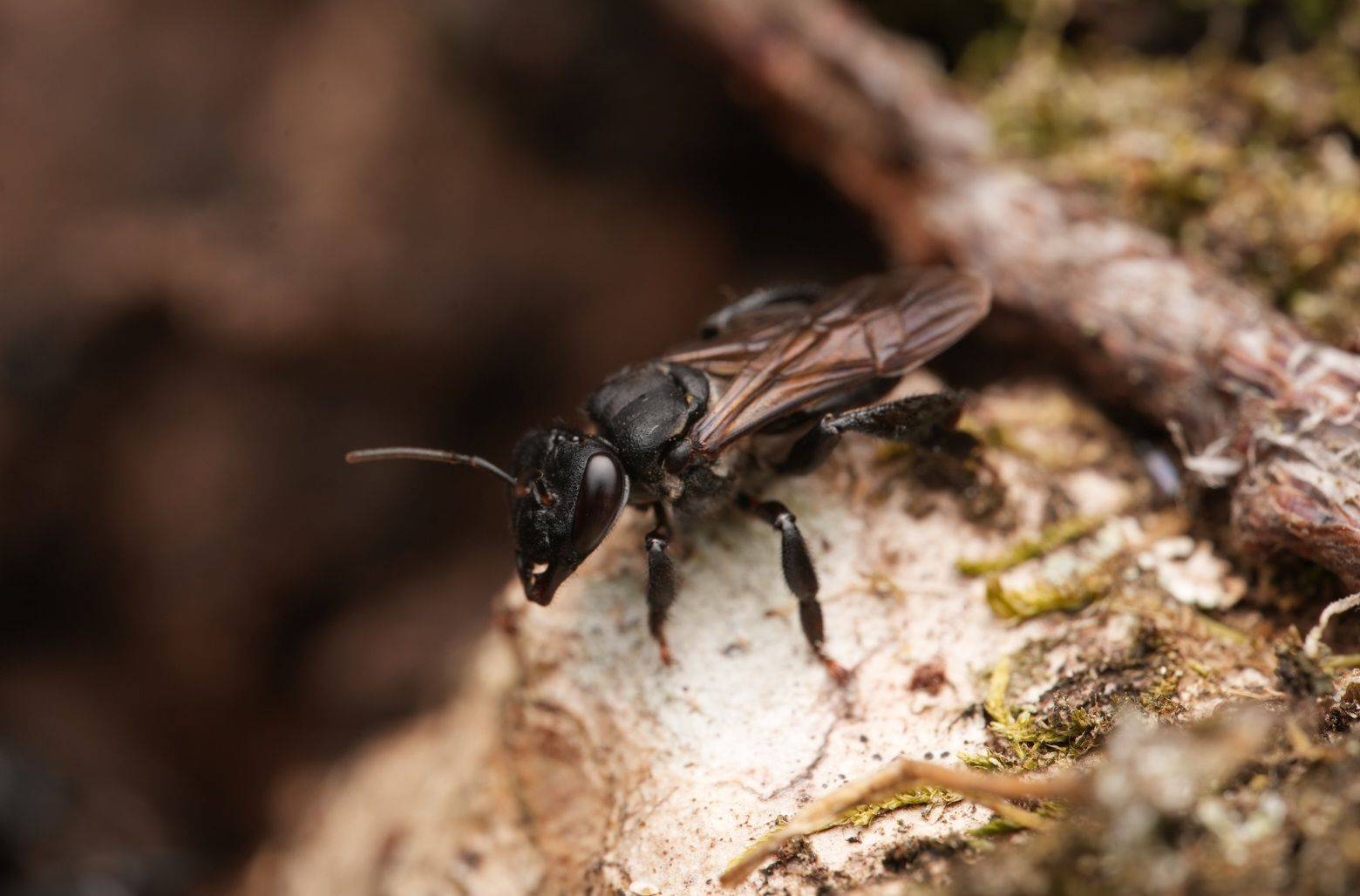
- Cephalotrigona capitata

Scientific classification
- Kingdom: Animalia
- Phylum: Arthropoda
- Class: Insecta
- Order: Hymenoptera
- Family: Apidae
- Tribe: Meliponini
- Genus: Cephalotrigona; Schwarz, 1940

= Cephalotrigona =

Genus of bees

Cephalotrigona is a genus of bees belonging to the family Apidae. The species of this genus are found in Central and South America.

== Species ==
There are five recognized species:

- Cephalotrigona capitata (Smith, 1854)
- Cephalotrigona eburneiventer (Schwarz, 1948)
- Cephalotrigona femorata (Smith, 1854)
- Cephalotrigona oaxacana Ayala, 1999
- Cephalotrigona zexmeniae (Cockerell, 1912)
