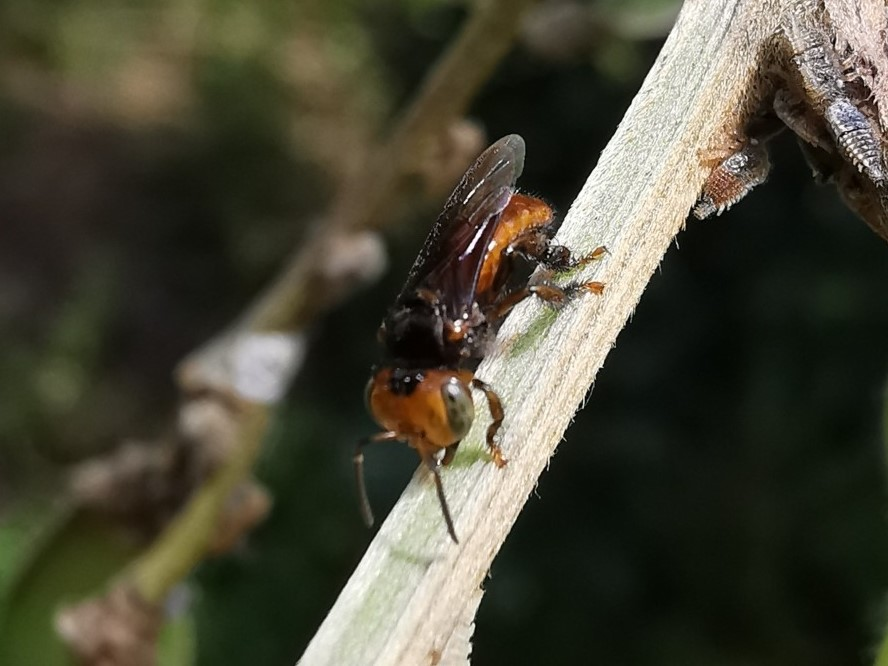
- Oxytrigona tataira specie

Scientific classification
- Kingdom: Animalia
- Phylum: Arthropoda
- Class: Insecta
- Order: Hymenoptera
- Family: Apidae
- Tribe: Meliponini
- Genus: Oxytrigona; Cockerell, 1917

= Oxytrigona =

Genus of bees

Oxytrigona is a genus of bees belonging to the family Apidae.

The species of this genus are found in South America.

Species:

- Oxytrigona chocoana Gonzalez & Roubik, 2008
- Oxytrigona daemoniaca Camargo, 1984
- Oxytrigona flaveola (Friese, 1900)
- Oxytrigona huaoranii Gonzalez & Roubik, 2008
- Oxytrigona ignis Camargo, 1984
- Oxytrigona isthmina Gonzalez & Roubik, 2008
- Oxytrigona mediorufa (Cockerell, 1913)
- Oxytrigona mellicolor (Packard, 1869)
- Oxytrigona mulfordi (Schwarz, 1948)
- Oxytrigona obscura (Friese, 1900)
- Oxytrigona tataira (Smith, 1863)
