= Scaura longula =

Scientific classification
- Kingdom: Animalia
- Phylum: Arthropoda
- Class: Insecta
- Order: Hymenoptera
- Family: Apidae
- Genus: Scaura
- Species: S. longula

Binomial name
- Scaura longula (Lepeletier, 1836)

Species of bee

Scaura longula is a species of eusocial stingless bee in the family Apidae and tribe Meliponini.
