= Scaptotrigona bipunctata =

Scientific classification
- Kingdom: Animalia
- Phylum: Arthropoda
- Class: Insecta
- Order: Hymenoptera
- Family: Apidae
- Genus: Scaptotrigona
- Species: S. bipunctata

Binomial name
- Scaptotrigona bipunctata (Lepeletier, 1836)

Species of bee

Scaptotrigona bipunctata, also called tubuna in Brazil, is a species of eusocial stingless bee in the family Apidae and tribe Meliponini.
