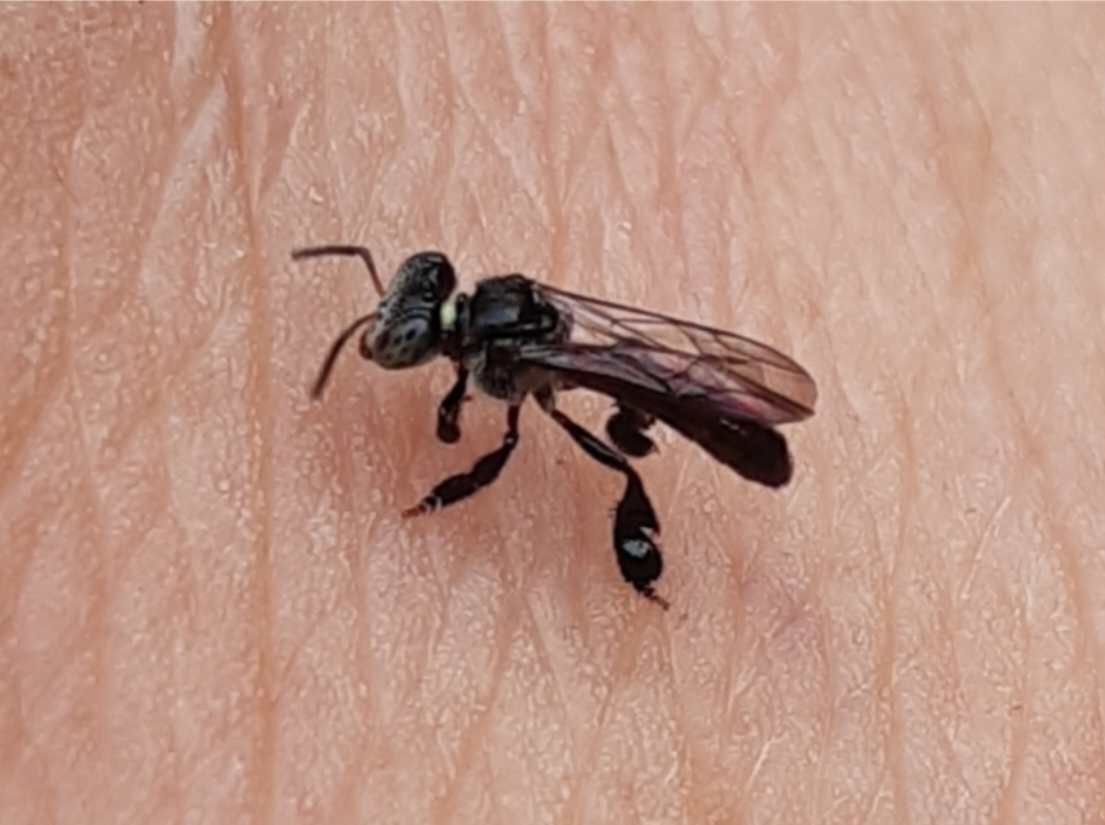

Scientific classification
- Kingdom: Animalia
- Phylum: Arthropoda
- Class: Insecta
- Order: Hymenoptera
- Family: Apidae
- Genus: Scaura
- Species: S. latitarsis

Binomial name
- Scaura latitarsis (Friese, 1900)

= Scaura latitarsis =

Species of bee

Scaura latitarsis is a species of eusocial stingless bee in the family Apidae and tribe Meliponini.
