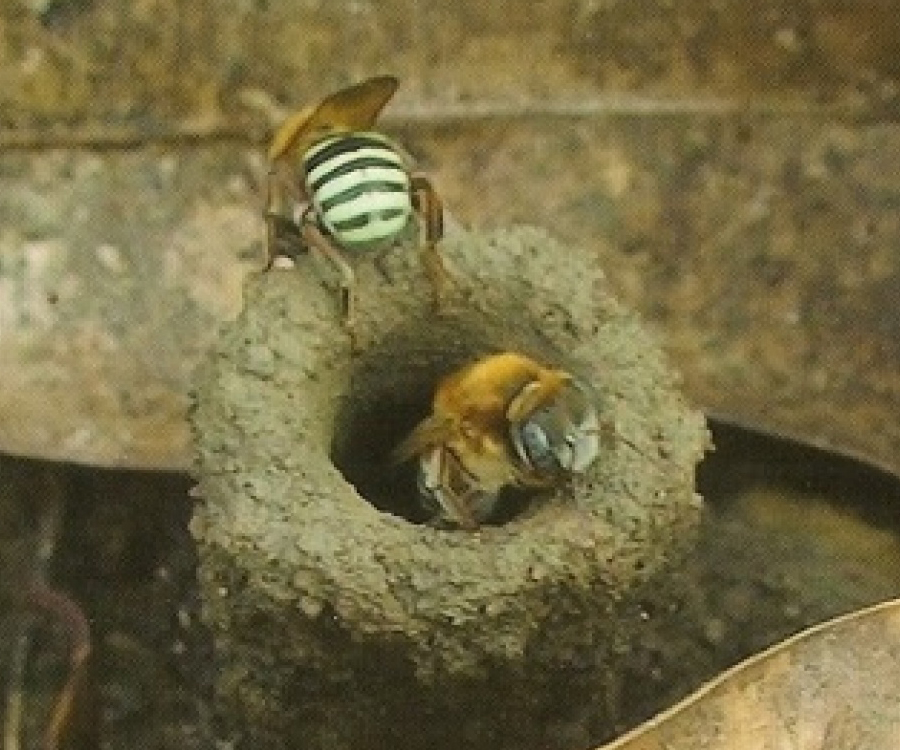

Scientific classification
- Kingdom: Animalia
- Phylum: Arthropoda
- Class: Insecta
- Order: Hymenoptera
- Family: Apidae
- Genus: Melipona
- Species: M. quinquefasciata

Binomial name
- Melipona quinquefasciata Lepeletier, 1836

Synonyms
- Melikerria quinquefasciata

= Melipona quinquefasciata =

Species of bee

Melipona quinquefasciata, commonly known as the mandaçaia-da-terra or mandaçaia-do-chão (Brazilian Portuguese: "ground mandaçaia" bee) in Brazil, is a species of eusocial stingless bee in the family Apidae and tribe Meliponini.
