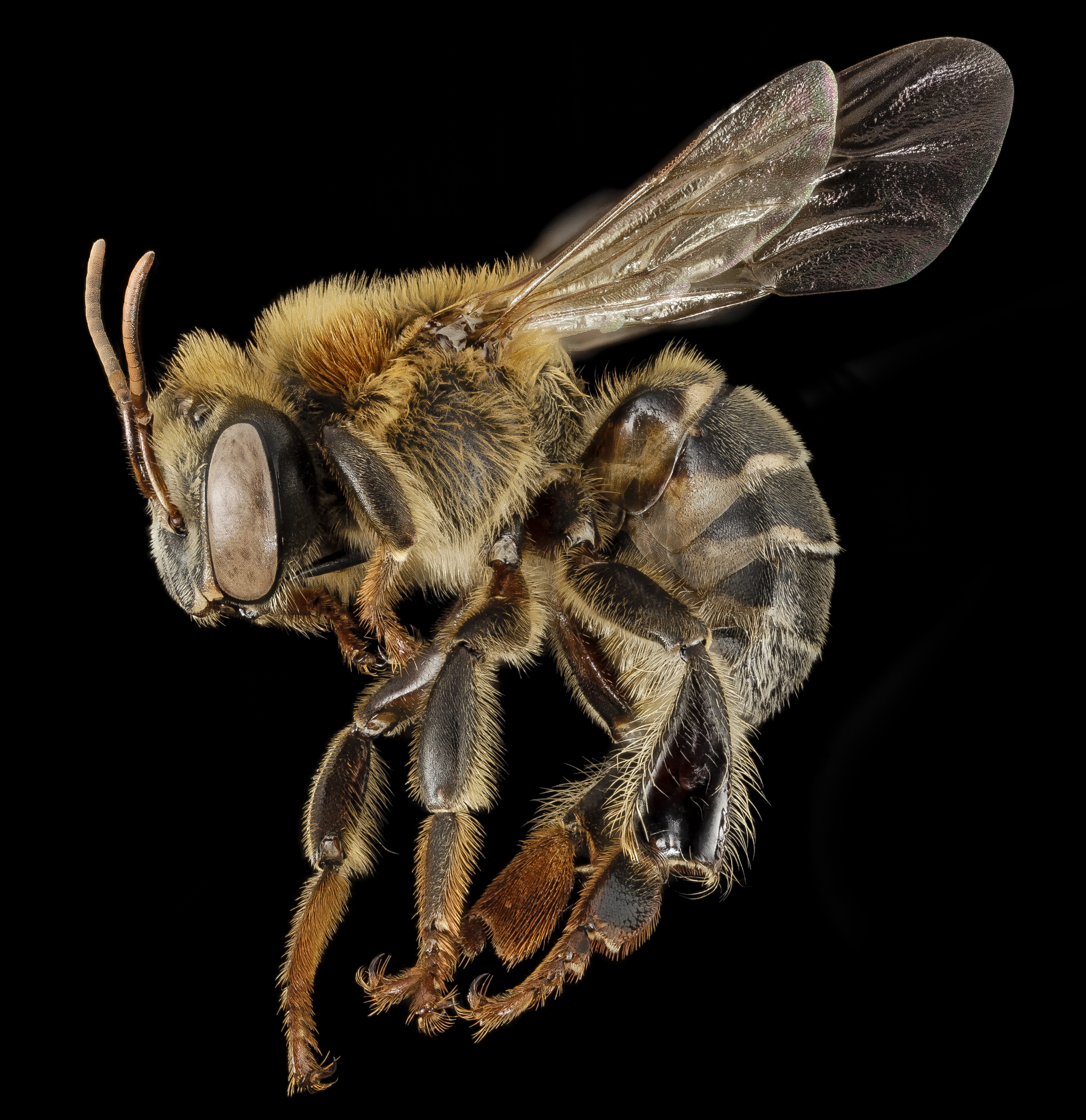

Scientific classification
- Domain: Eukaryota
- Kingdom: Animalia
- Phylum: Arthropoda
- Class: Insecta
- Order: Hymenoptera
- Family: Apidae
- Tribe: Meliponini
- Genus: Melipona; Illiger, 1806

Species
- Some 40, see text

= Melipona =

Genus of bees

Melipona is a genus of stingless bees, widespread in warm areas of the Neotropics, from Sinaloa and Tamaulipas (México) to Tucumán and Misiones (Argentina). About 70 species are known. The largest producer of honey from Melipona bees in Mexico is in the state of Yucatán where bees are studied at an interactive park called "Bee Planet" which is within the Cuxtal Ecological Reserve.

Several species are kept for honey production, such as in Brazil, where some are well-known enough to have common names, including uruçu, mandaçaia, jandaíra, and manduri. Melipona honey has long been used by humans and now is of minor commercial importance. Research is going on in improved beekeeping techniques.

== Subtaxa ==
The following are some proposed subtaxa of Melipona, although they are not yet widely used.

- Eomelipona
- Melikerria
- Melipona (sensu stricto)
- Michmelia

== Selected taxa ==
The genus includes the following species:

- Melipona amazonica (Schulz, 1905)
- Melipona asilvai (Moure, 1971)
- Melipona baeri (Vachal, 1904)
- Melipona beecheii (Bennett, 1831)
- Melipona belizeae (Schwarz, 1932)
- Melipona bicolor (Lepeletier, 1836) – guarupu, guaraipo
- Melipona boliviana (Schwarz, 1932)
- Melipona brachychaeta (Moure, 1950)
- Melipona bradleyi (Schwarz, 1932) (Melipona illustris (Schwarz, 1932))
- Melipona capixaba (Moure & Camargo, 1995)
- Melipona captiosa (Moure, 1962)
- Melipona carrikeri (Cockerell, 1919)
- Melipona colimana (Ayala, 1999)
- Melipona compressipes (Fabricius, 1804) – tiúba
  - Melipona compressipes manaosensis – jupará
- Melipona costaricaensis (Cockerell, 1919)
- Melipona cramptoni (Cockerell, 1920)
- Melipona crinita (Moure & Kerr, 1950)
- Melipona dubia (Moure & Kerr, 1950)
- Melipona eburnea (Friese, 1900)
- Melipona fasciata (Latreille, 1811)
- Melipona fasciculata (Smith, 1854)
- Melipona favosa (Fabricius, 1798)
- Melipona fuliginosa (Lepeletier, 1836)
- Melipona flavolineata (Friese, 1900)
- Melipona fulva (Lepeletier, 1836)
- Melipona fuscata (Lepeletier, 1836)
- Melipona fuscopilosa (Moure & Kerr, 1950)
- Melipona fuscipes (Latreille, 1811)
- Melipona grandis (Guérin-Méneville, 1844)
- Melipona illota (Cockerell, 1919)
- Melipona indecisa (Cockerell, 1919)
- Melipona interrupta (Latreille, 1811) – jandaíra
- Melipona lateralis (Erichson, 1848)
- Melipona lupitae (Ayala, 1999)
- Melipona mandacaia (Smith, 1863)
- Melipona marginata (Lepeletier, 1836) – manduri, manduri menor, mandurim, minduri, gurupu-do-miúdo, taipeira
- Melipona melanopleura (Cockerell, 1919)
- Melipona melanoventer (Schwarz, 1932)
- Melipona merrillae (Cockerell, 1919)
- Melipona micheneri (Schwarz, 1951)
- Melipona mimetica (Cockerell, 1914)
- Melipona mondury (Smith, 1863)
- Melipona nebulosa (Camargo, 1988)
- Melipona nigrescens (Friese, 1900)
- Melipona obscurior (Moure, 1971)
- Melipona ogilviei (Schwarz, 1932)
- Melipona orbignyi (Guérin-Méneville, 1844)
- Melipona panamica (Cockerell, 1919)
- Melipona paraensis (Ducke, 1916)
- Melipona peruviana (Friese, 1900)
- Melipona puncticollis (Friese, 1902)
- Melipona quadrifasciata (Lepeletier, 1836) – mandaçaia, amanaçaia, manaçaia, "uruçu"
  - M. q. anthidioides
- Melipona quinquefasciata (Lepeletier, 1836) – mandaçaia-da-terra, mandaçaia-do-chão, uruçu-do-chão
- Melipona rufescens (Friese, 1900 )
- Melipona ruficrus – irapuá
- Melipona rufiventris (Lepeletier, 1836) – uruçu-amarela, tuiuva, tujuba, bugia
  - M. r. paraensis – uruçu-boca-de-ralo
- Melipona salti (Schwarz, 1932)
- Melipona schwarzi (Moure, 1963)
- Melipona scutellaris (Latreille, 1811) – uruçu-nordestina, "uruçu"
- Melipona seminigra (Friese, 1903)
  - M. s. atrofulva
  - M. s. abunensis
  - M. s. merrillae – boca-de-renda
  - M. s. pernigra
- Melipona solani (Cockerell, 1912)
- Melipona subnitida (Ducke, 1911) – jandaíra
- Melipona titania (Gribodo, 1893)
- Melipona torrida (Friese, 1917)
- Melipona triplaridis (Cockerell, 1925)
- Melipona tumupasae (Schwarz, 1932)
- Melipona variegatipes (Gribodo, 1893)
  - M. v. lautipes
- Melipona yucatanica (Camargo, Moure & Roubik, 1988)

== See also ==
- Stingless bee
- List of stingless bees of Brazil
- Melittology
- Bees and toxic chemicals
- Trigona, another genus of stingless bees
