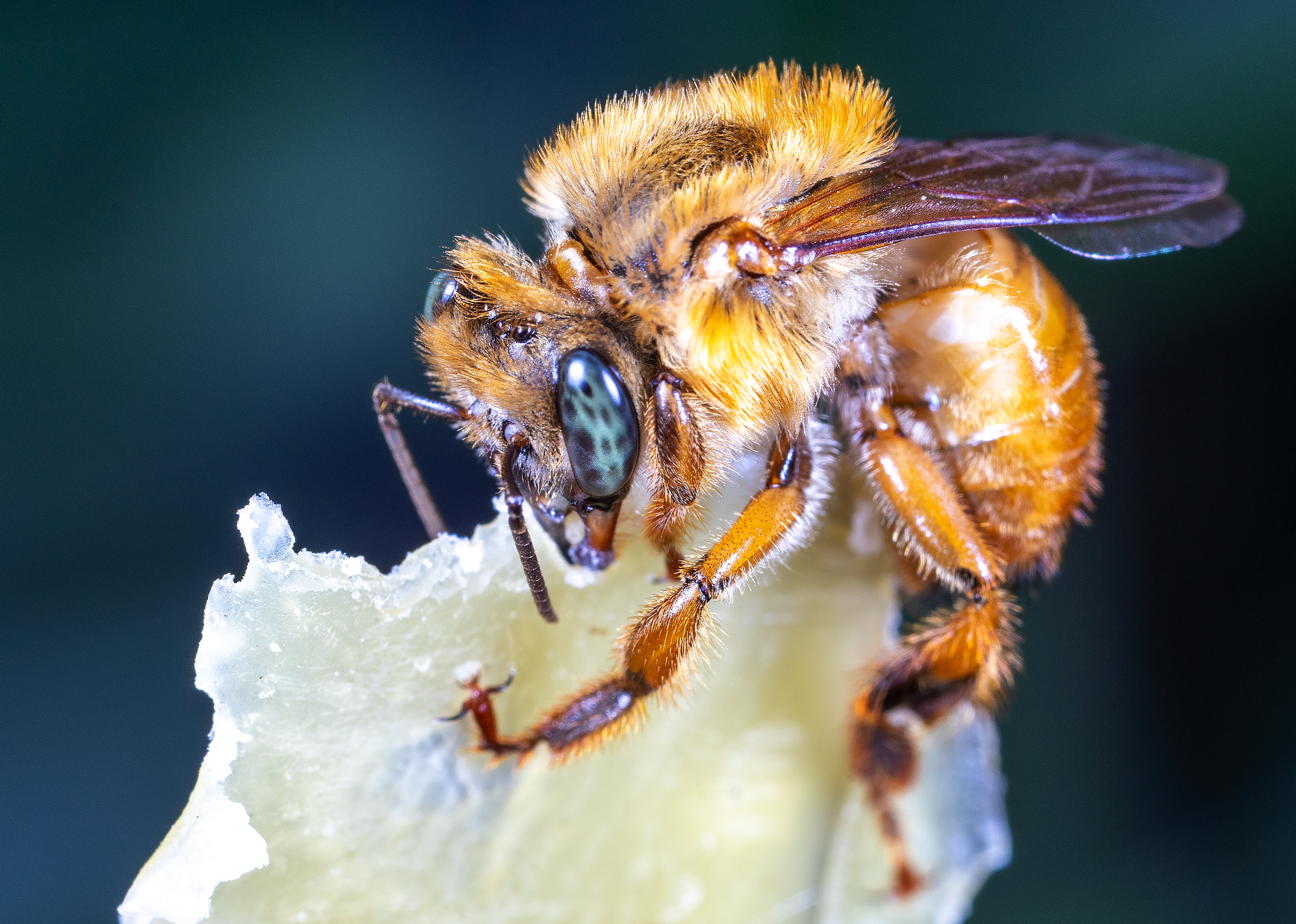

Scientific classification
- Kingdom: Animalia
- Phylum: Arthropoda
- Class: Insecta
- Order: Hymenoptera
- Family: Apidae
- Genus: Melipona
- Species: M. rufiventris

Binomial name
- Melipona rufiventris Lepeletier, 1836

Synonyms
- Michmelia rufiventris

= Melipona rufiventris =

Species of bee

Melipona rufiventris, commonly known as tujuba in Brazil, is a species of eusocial stingless bee in the family Apidae and tribe Meliponini. It is endemic to Brazil.
