= Trigona amalthea =

Scientific classification
- Domain: Eukaryota
- Kingdom: Animalia
- Phylum: Arthropoda
- Class: Insecta
- Order: Hymenoptera
- Family: Apidae
- Genus: Trigona
- Species: T. amalthea

Binomial name
- Trigona amalthea (Olivier, 1789)

Species of bee

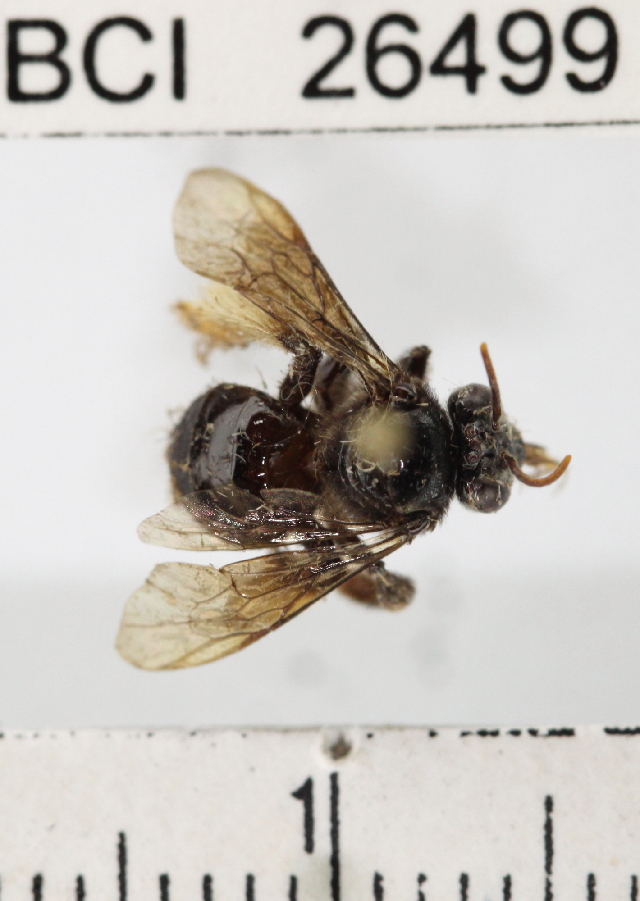

Trigona amalthea, commonly known as jandaíra-preta or sanharão in Brazil, is a species of eusocial stingless bee in the family Apidae and tribe Meliponini.
