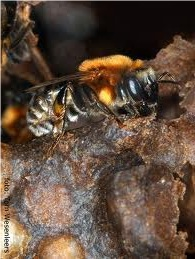

Scientific classification
- Kingdom: Animalia
- Phylum: Arthropoda
- Clade: Pancrustacea
- Class: Insecta
- Order: Hymenoptera
- Family: Apidae
- Genus: Melipona
- Species: M. subnitida

Binomial name
- Melipona subnitida Ducke, 1911

= Melipona subnitida =

Species of bee

Melipona subnitida is a neotropical bee species in the Apidae family found in the dry areas of Northeastern Brazil. This species of stingless bees practices single mating, monogynous habits.

This species nests in hollow trunks of living trees, where the workers create a vertical colony. The dominance hierarchy of these perennial colonies is defined by one queen who controls her workers. Out of all of the stingless bees, M. subnitida is fairly profitable given its ability to pollinate and create honey. There is ongoing field research on the behavioral ecology of this species.

== Taxonomy and phylogeny ==
Melipona subnitida is part of the family Apidae. This species is within the tribe Meliponini ("stingless bees"), and was originally described by Adolpho Ducke, a Brazilian researcher.

== Description and identification ==
The Melipona subnitida species is divided into the queen, female workers, and males within each colony. They are identifiable by their obscure metasomal bands, lack of facial maculation, and fulvous thoracic pile.

=== Queen characteristics ===
The queen of the Melipona subnitida typically only mates with one male, resulting in high relatedness between female offspring of 0.75 since males are haploid so sisters are 100% related through the male line and half related through the female. The queen lays eggs and lives with her daughters, who are expected to stay with her and help her to maintain the young. The queen is identifiable by her lack of pollen carrying hairs on certain legs and she is smaller in size. Also, her abdomen becomes highly expanded, to a point it can no longer fly.

=== Workers ===
The workers of this species maintain the strongest fighting abilities, and come from larger cells than males.

=== Males ===
The males of Melipona subnitida are reared similarly to workers, although they are raised in different cell sizes. Workers of M. subnitida strongly resemble those of Melipona favosa.

== Distribution and habitat ==
M. subnitida's geographical region, NE Brazil

Melipona subnitida are commonly found in northeastern Brazil where they are thought to be an important pollinator and honey producer. They are found specifically in the hollow trunks of living Bursera leptophloeos trees. They are notable of the caatinga biome, where they are important in the economy of the human population there due to their pollination and honey production.

=== Colony growth ===
Perennial colonies of Melipona subnitida are composed of several hundred to a thousand individuals. Colonies are created as brood cells in horizontal combs. New cells are formed as a new comb is formed on top of the old one, or a new comb is created from scratch. By adding combs peripherally, a vertical column of combs is created. These colonies demonstrate monogyny through their mating habits. It has also been observed that the growth of males within colonies abides by "male-producing periods" in which males are produced during a specific, controlled, period of time. It is noted that both the workers and queens contribute to the offspring of the colonies, so there is a varying proportion per population of bees that are born from the queen or the workers. The queen maintains her power by killing cells that may contain potential queens. Only one queen may exist in a colony at a time and she lays eggs and lives together with her daughters. It is the responsibility of the daughters to take care of brood, protect the nest, and forage for food.

=== Colony decline ===
Causes of colony decline are the destructive extraction of colonies for profit, or from deforestation, thus destroying the nests of this species.

== Parasites ==
This species has been observed to be a host for a variety of parasites such as flies, beetle mites, moths, ants, and robber stingless bees. There have specifically been noted an infestation of mantisflies of the M. subnitida colonies in Northeastern Brazil.

== Human importance ==
=== Apiculture ===
This species is known for easy handling and producing good honey. Artificial colonies can be maintained by bee-keepers. It is common to farm this species within urban environments in its native range.

=== Honey production ===
M. subnitida brood chambers may produce one litre of honey a year in the caatinga region of Brazil. Older colonies of M. subnitida have been known produce up to six litres of honey. This honey, called jandaíra honey, is considered quite profitable and maintains a particular taste due to the mechanism by which it is made by these bees. The honey, like most honey, mostly consists of glucose and fructose. This species is able to help the population in this area with a lucrative industry, but the practice is mostly unsustainable due to predatory extraction and deforestation, which are the main causes of the decline of M. subnitida.

=== Wax ===
M. subnitida produces a dark brown wax, which was formerly used to seal food receptacles.

=== Pollen ===
The pollen collected by M. subnitida is mostly from the locally very common plant species Mimosa caesalpiniifolia. Most pollen came from common species found locally, including non-native Eucalyptus. Fabaceae is the most important plant family for this bee species.
