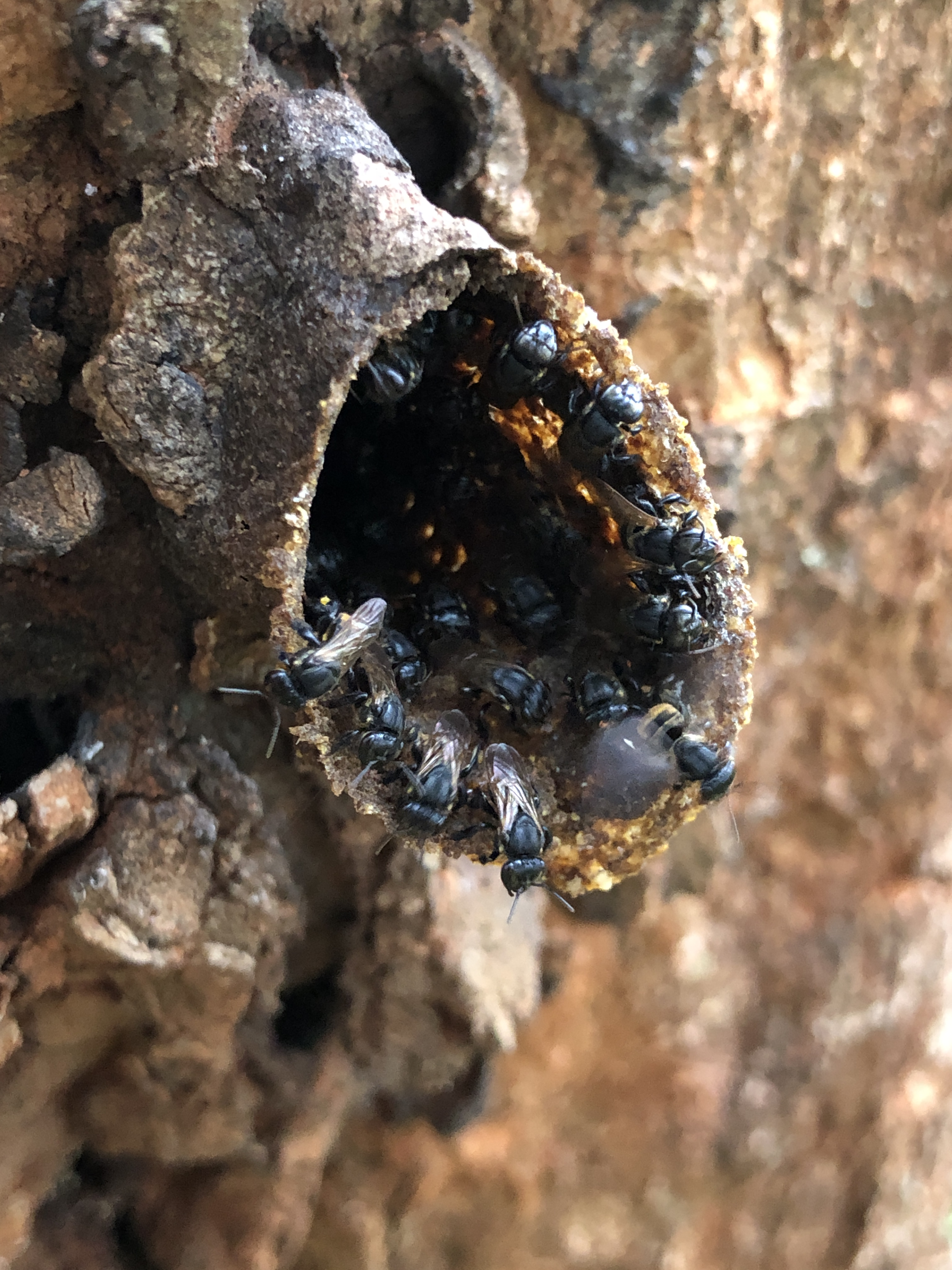
- Scaptotrigona postica

Scientific classification
- Kingdom: Animalia
- Phylum: Arthropoda
- Class: Insecta
- Order: Hymenoptera
- Family: Apidae
- Tribe: Meliponini
- Genus: Scaptotrigona; Moure, 1942

= Scaptotrigona =

Genus of bees

Scaptotrigona is a genus of bees belonging to the family Apidae.

The species of this genus are found in Central and South America.

Species:

- Scaptotrigona affabra (Moure, 1989)
- Scaptotrigona anaulax Engel, 2022
- Scaptotrigona ascheri Engel, 2022
- Scaptotrigona aurantipes Engel, 2022
- Scaptotrigona baldwini Engel, 2022
- Scaptotrigona barrocoloradensis (Schwarz, 1951)
- Scaptotrigona bipunctata (Lepeletier, 1836)
- Scaptotrigona caduceus Engel, 2022
- Scaptotrigona depilis (Moure, 1942)
- Scaptotrigona ederi Engel, 2022
- Scaptotrigona emersoni (Schwarz, 1938)
- Scaptotrigona extranea Engel, 2022
- Scaptotrigona faviziae Engel, 2022
- Scaptotrigona fimbriata Engel, 2022
- Scaptotrigona fulvicutis (Moure, 1964)
- Scaptotrigona gonzalezi Engel, 2022
- Scaptotrigona grueteri Engel, 2022
- Scaptotrigona hellwegeri (Friese, 1900)
- Scaptotrigona illescasi Engel, 2022
- Scaptotrigona jujuyensis (Schrottky, 1911)
- Scaptotrigona kuperi Engel, 2022
- Scaptotrigona limae (Brèthes, 1920)
- Scaptotrigona luteipennis (Friese, 1902)
- Scaptotrigona macarenensis Engel, 2022
- Scaptotrigona magdalenae Engel, 2022
- Scaptotrigona mexicana (Guérin-Méneville, 1844)
- Scaptotrigona nigrohirta Nogueira & Santos-Silva, 2022
- Scaptotrigona nuda Engel, 2022
- Scaptotrigona ochrotricha (Buysson, 1892)
- Scaptotrigona pasiphaea Engel, 2022
- Scaptotrigona pectoralis (Dalla Torre, 1896)
- Scaptotrigona polysticta Moure, 1950
- Scaptotrigona postica (Latreille, 1807)
- Scaptotrigona psile Engel, 2022
- Scaptotrigona rosellae Engel, 2022
- Scaptotrigona santiago Engel, 2022
- Scaptotrigona semiflava Engel, 2022
- Scaptotrigona silviae Engel, 2022
- Scaptotrigona stipula Engel, 2022
- Scaptotrigona subobscuripennis (Schwarz, 1951)
- Scaptotrigona tatacoensis Engel, 2022
- Scaptotrigona totobi Engel, 2022
- Scaptotrigona tricolorata Camargo, 1988
- Scaptotrigona tubiba (Smith, 1863)
- Scaptotrigona vitorum Engel, 2022
- Scaptotrigona wheeleri (Cockerell, 1913)
- Scaptotrigona xanthotricha Moure, 1950
- Scaptotrigona yungasensis Engel, 2022
