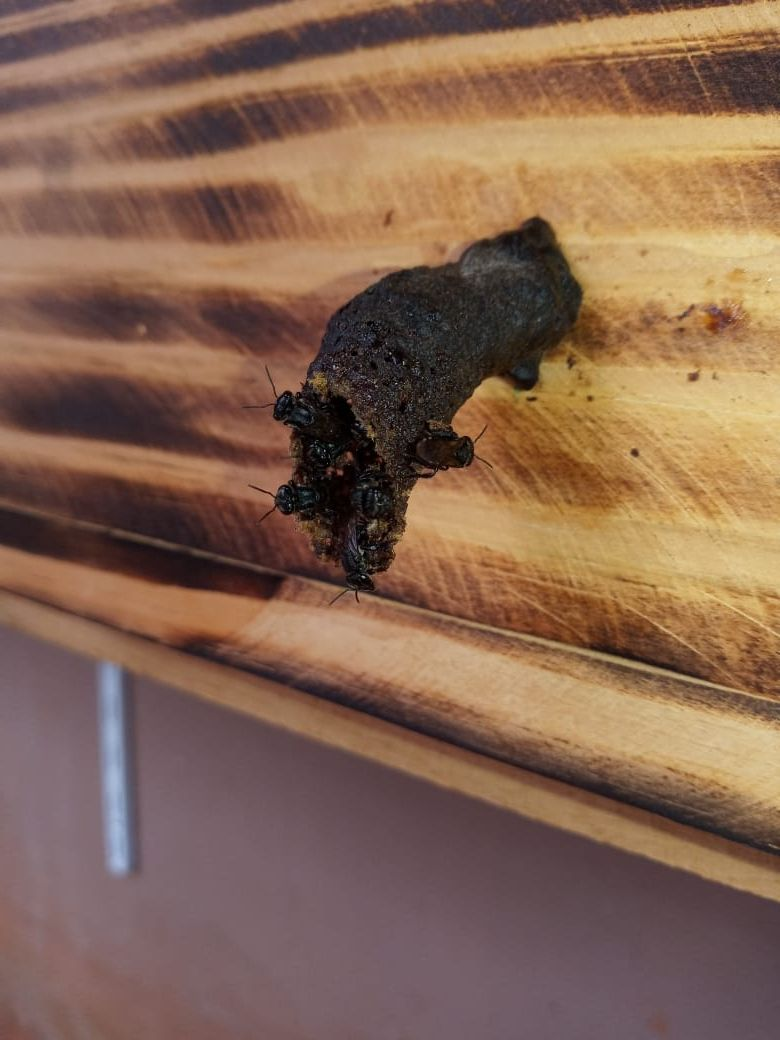

Scientific classification
- Kingdom: Animalia
- Phylum: Arthropoda
- Class: Insecta
- Order: Hymenoptera
- Family: Apidae
- Genus: Scaptotrigona
- Species: S. polysticta

Binomial name
- Scaptotrigona polysticta Moure, 1950

= Scaptotrigona polysticta =

Species of bee

Scaptotrigona polysticta, called bijuí or benjoí in Brazil, is a species of eusocial stingless bee in the family Apidae and tribe Meliponini.
