= Melipona interrupta =

Scientific classification
- Kingdom: Animalia
- Phylum: Arthropoda
- Class: Insecta
- Order: Hymenoptera
- Family: Apidae
- Genus: Melipona
- Species: M. interrupta

Binomial name
- Melipona interrupta Latreille, 1811

Synonyms
- Melikerria interrupta

Species of bee

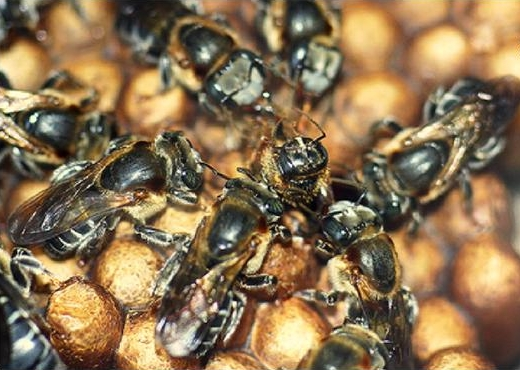

Melipona interrupta, commonly known as jandaíra in Brazil, is a species of eusocial stingless bee in the family Apidae and tribe Meliponini.
