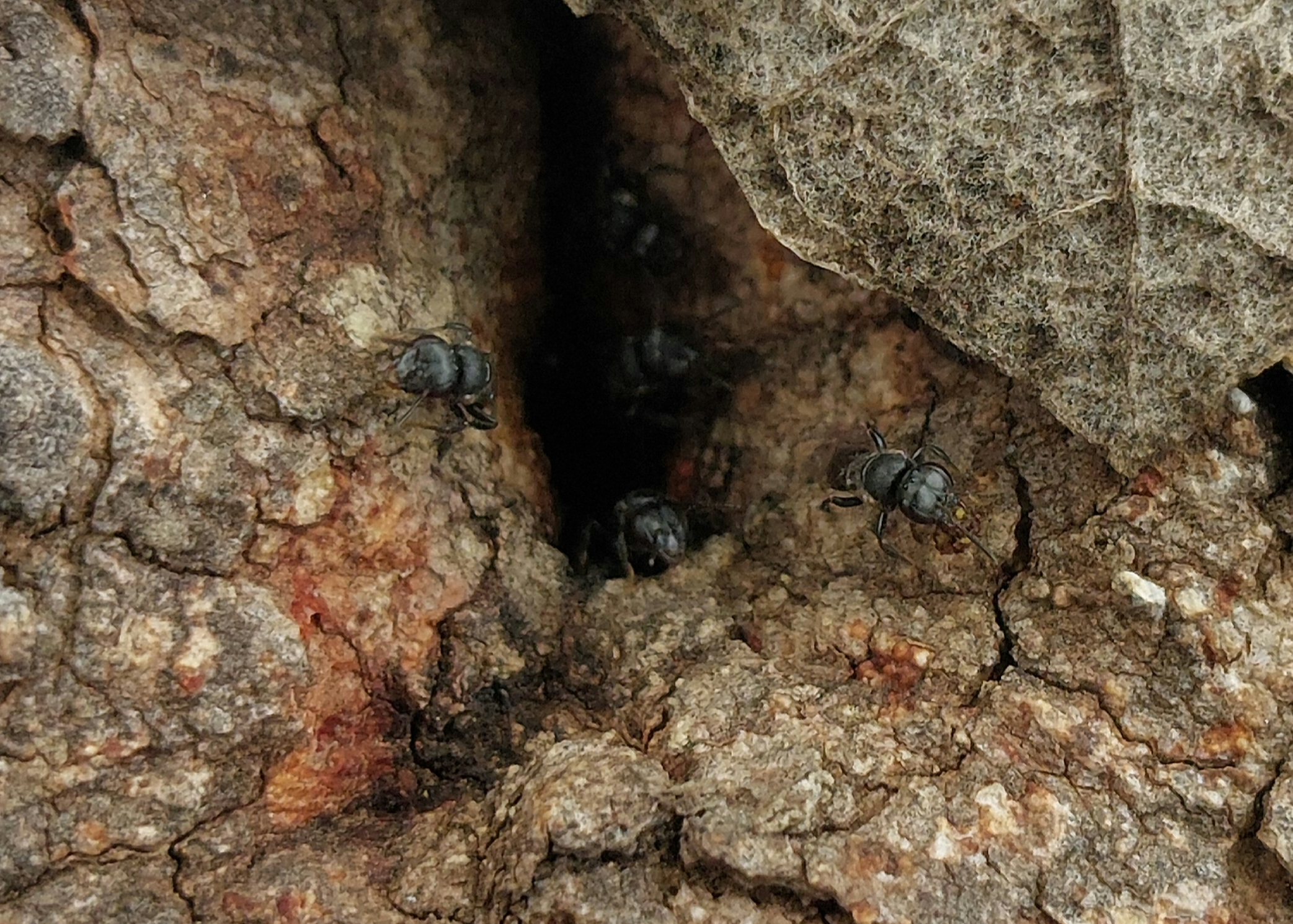

Scientific classification
- Kingdom: Animalia
- Phylum: Arthropoda
- Class: Insecta
- Order: Hymenoptera
- Family: Apidae
- Tribe: Meliponini
- Genus: Trigonisca; Moure, 1950

= Trigonisca =

Genus of bees

Trigonisca is a genus of bees belonging to the family Apidae.

The species of this genus are found in Central and South America.

Species:

- Trigonisca ameliae Penney, 2013
- Trigonisca atomaria (Cockerell, 1917)
- Trigonisca azteca Ayala, 1999
- Trigonisca bidentata Albuquerque & Camargo, 2007
- Trigonisca browni (Camargo & Pedro, 2005)
- Trigonisca buyssoni (Friese, 1902)
- Trigonisca ceophloei (Schwarz, 1938)
- Trigonisca chachapoya (Camargo & Pedro, 2005)
- Trigonisca clavicornis (Camargo & Pedro, 2005)
- Trigonisca discolor (Wille, 1965)
- Trigonisca dobzhanskyi (Moure, 1950)
- Trigonisca duckei (Friese, 1900)
- Trigonisca euclydiana (Camargo & Pedro, 2009)
- Trigonisca extrema Albuquerque & Camargo, 2007
- Trigonisca flavicans (Moure, 1950)
- Trigonisca fraissei (Friese, 1901)
- Trigonisca graeffei (Friese, 1900)
- Trigonisca hirsuticornis (Camargo & Pedro, 2009)
- Trigonisca hirticornis Albuquerque & Camargo, 2007
- Trigonisca intermedia Moure, 1989
- Trigonisca longicornis (Friese, 1903)
- Trigonisca longitarsis (Ducke, 1916)
- Trigonisca manauara (Camargo & Pedro, 2009)
- Trigonisca martinezi (Brèthes, 1920)
- Trigonisca maya Ayala, 1999
- Trigonisca mendersoni (Camargo & Pedro, 2005)
- Trigonisca mepecheu Engel & Gonzalez, 2019
- Trigonisca meridionalis Albuquerque & Camargo, 2007
- Trigonisca mixteca Ayala, 1999
- Trigonisca moratoi (Camargo & Pedro, 2005)
- Trigonisca nataliae (Moure, 1950)
- Trigonisca pediculana (Fabricius, 1804)
- Trigonisca pipioli Ayala, 1999
- Trigonisca rondoni (Camargo & Pedro, 2005)
- Trigonisca roubiki Albuquerque & Camargo, 2007
- Trigonisca schulthessi (Friese, 1900)
- Trigonisca tavaresi (Camargo & Pedro, 2005)
- Trigonisca townsendi (Cockerell, 1911)
- Trigonisca unidentata Albuquerque & Camargo, 2007
- Trigonisca variegatifrons Albuquerque & Camargo, 2007
- Trigonisca vitrifrons Albuquerque & Camargo, 2007
