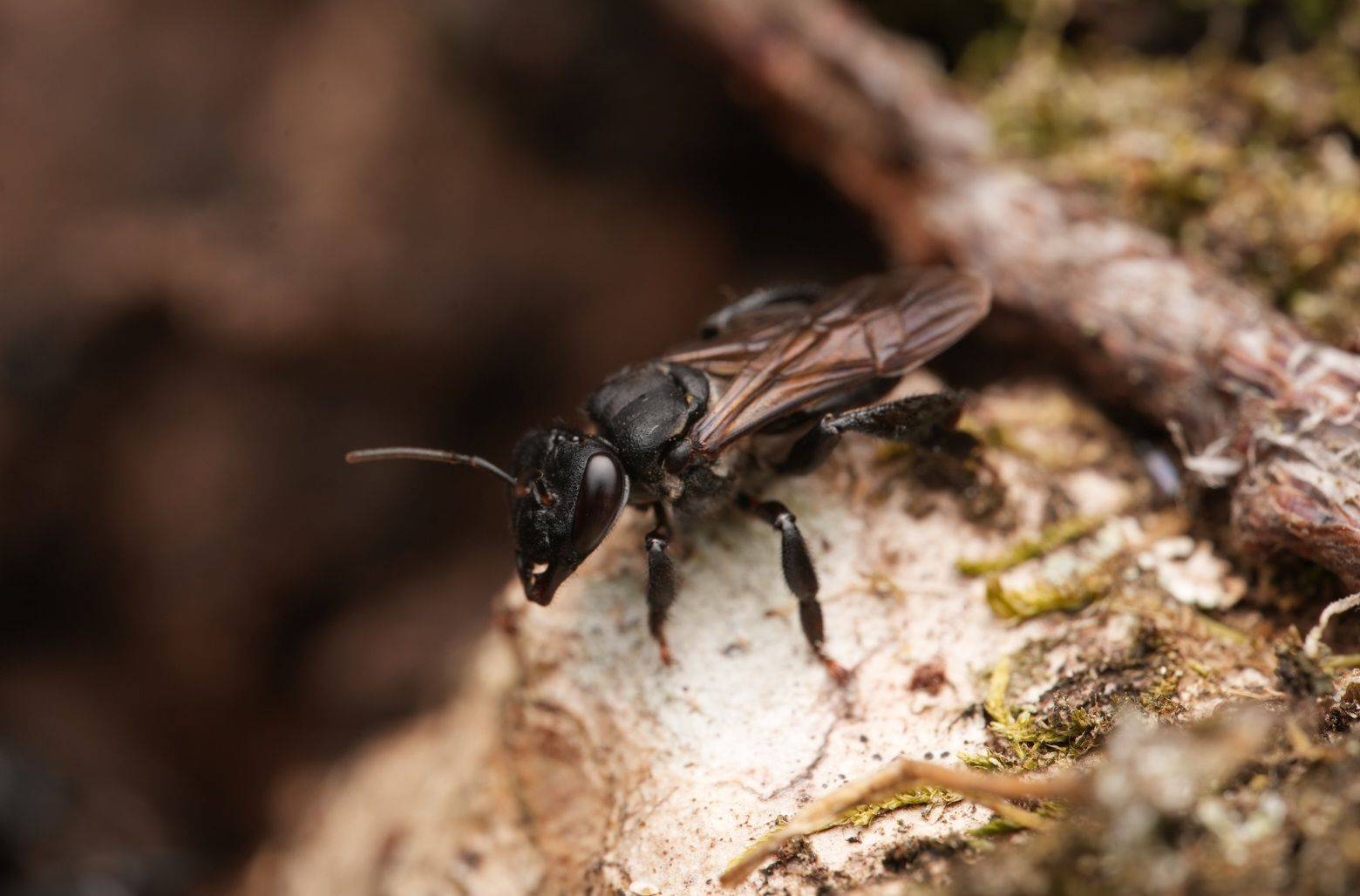

Scientific classification
- Kingdom: Animalia
- Phylum: Arthropoda
- Class: Insecta
- Order: Hymenoptera
- Family: Apidae
- Genus: Cephalotrigona
- Species: C. capitata

Binomial name
- Cephalotrigona capitata (Smith, 1854)

Synonyms
- Trigona capitata Smith, 1854; Trigona capitata virgilii Friese, 1901

= Cephalotrigona capitata =

Species of bee

Cephalotrigona capitata is a species of eusocial stingless bee in the family Apidae. It is found in South and Middle America and in the Caribbean.
