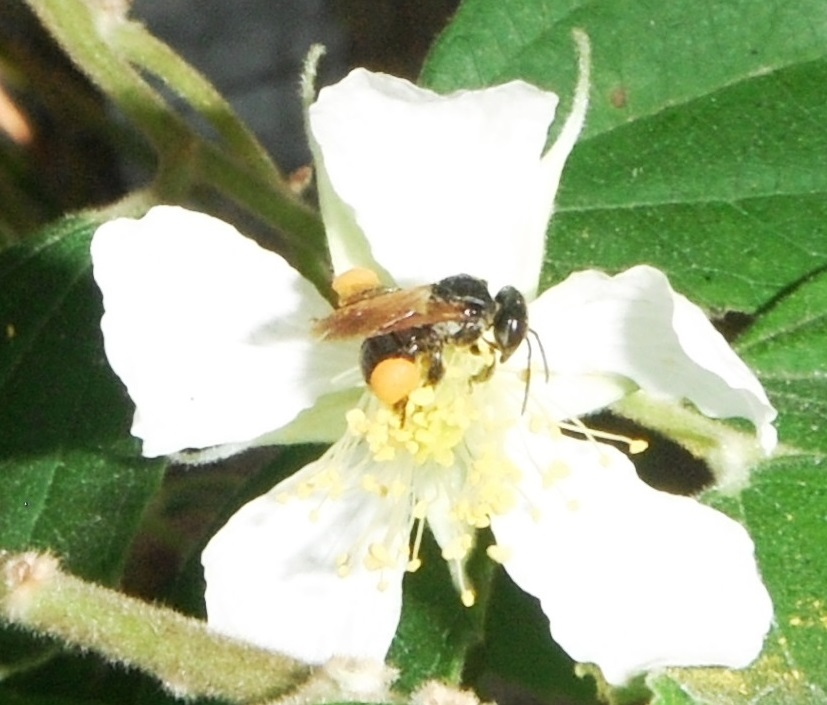
- Scaptotrigona mexicana collecting pollen

Scientific classification
- Kingdom: Animalia
- Phylum: Arthropoda
- Clade: Pancrustacea
- Class: Insecta
- Order: Hymenoptera
- Family: Apidae
- Genus: Scaptotrigona
- Species: S. mexicana

Binomial name
- Scaptotrigona mexicana Guérin-Méneville, 1845

= Scaptotrigona mexicana =

Species of bee

Scaptotrigona mexicana is a species of stingless bee that lives throughout Mexico and is part of the Meliponini tribe. This species is sometimes termed "Pisil Nekmej" and is extensively studied for its medicinal purposes. This species is considered common and abundant throughout Mexico and it has been noted to thrive in tropical environments.

== Taxonomy and phylogeny ==
S. mexicana is part of the family Apidae and is in the tribe Meliponini. This species was named by Félix Édouard Guérin-Méneville in 1845.

== Description and identification ==
S. mexicana is composed of a queen, female workers, and males within each colony. The males of this species are haploid and the queens single mate, resulting in reproductive colonies throughout the year. This species has been noted to be stingless and have strong jaws with which to bite.

=== Queen characteristics ===
The queen is noted to focus on single mating, and colonies are often formed within areas where virgin queens are thought to settle in. The male bees are able to distinguish between a physogastric and a virgin queen, allowing them to strategically form a colony in a place where reproductive success is greater.

=== Workers ===
The workers from the same colony maintain identical paternal alleles and one of two maternal alleles, resulting from the single mating habits of the queen. The workers can be identified by the aggressive mannerism with which they protect and defend the nest. Additionally, workers of this species maintain black/dark brown heads, scutellums, metasomas, and abdomens, with no stripes. Their thorax is measured to be around 2.44 mm wide.

== Distribution and habitat ==
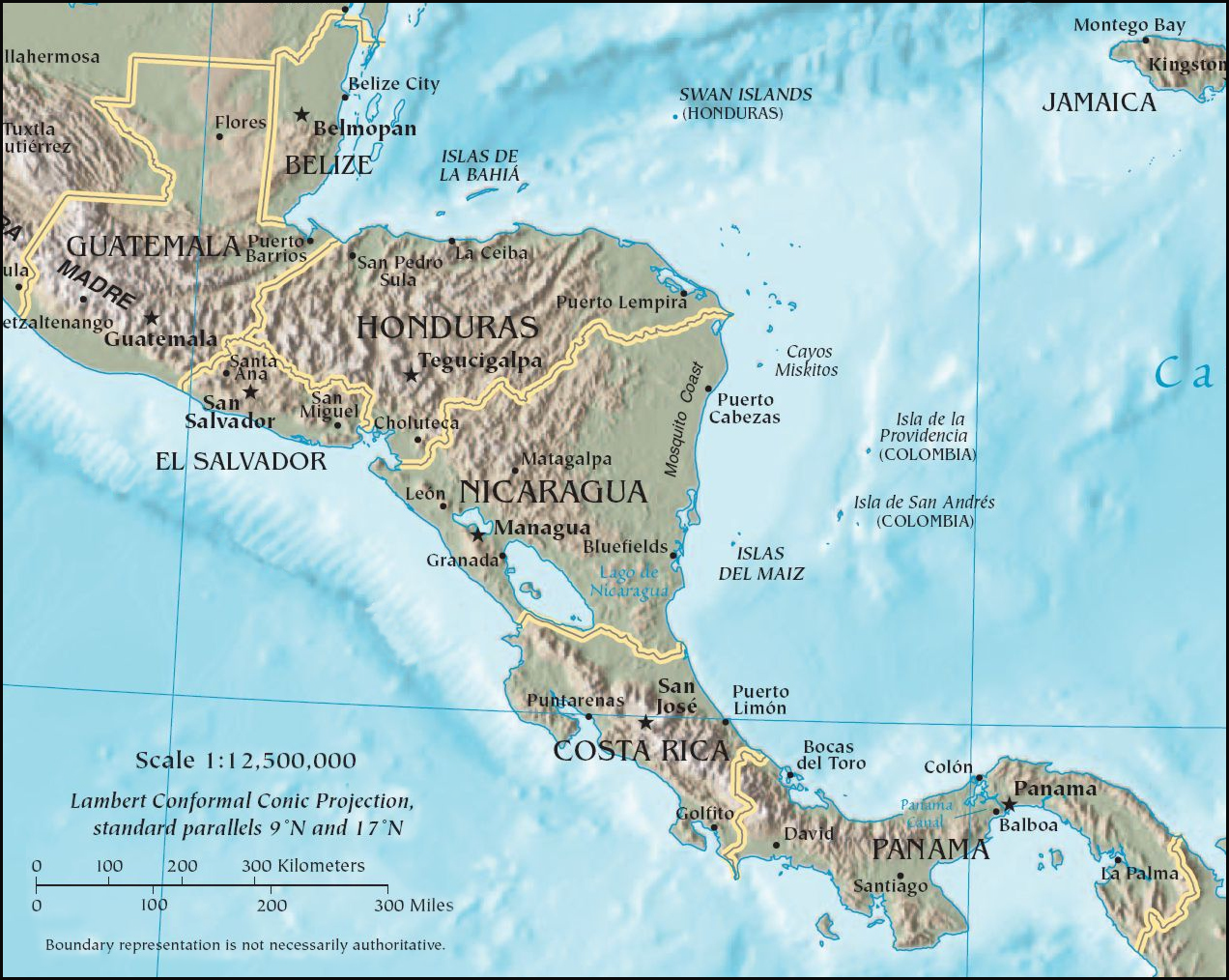
Distribution of S. mexicana

The S. mexicana species is distributed through Central America from the 24th degree to 8th degree northern latitude. This species is noted to inhabit Southeastern Mexico along with around 30 other bee species.

=== Environmental adaptations ===
It has been found that the body size, body color, and geographic distribution of stingless bees are correlated. S. mexicana is often found in wet lowlands but primarily in elevated mountain regions, which is supported by the idea that stingless bees of dark color and average size tend to remain in high attitudes.

== Colony cycle ==
=== Colony growth ===
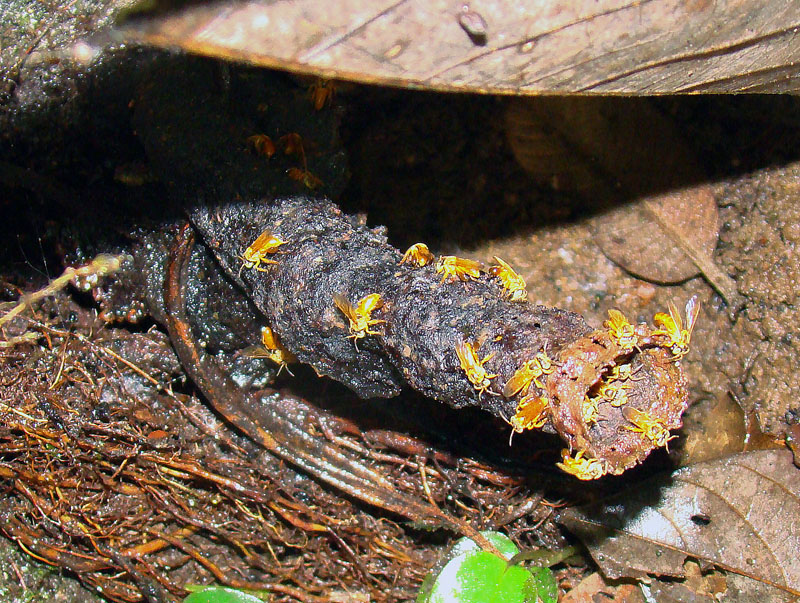
Meliponini species inhabiting hollow tree trunk

It has been noted that new colonies of S. mexicana can be formed with 2750 mature pupae and 50 g of brood. This species is noted to inhabit Southeastern Mexico, where it nests in the hollows of tree trunks. S. mexicana lives in these tree cavities where they form colonies by stacking brood cells in the shape of a pyramid. It is possible to distinguish colonies within the species since there are identical paternal alleles. This species has been observed forming drones very close to nests, strategically waiting to create these drones near where a potential virgin queen may be. Additionally, this species tends to forage in trees and shrubs, which helps to enhance its polylectic behavior. They have especially been seen to have high diversity values because of the diverse resources that they live and take resources from.

=== Drone congregations ===
The S. mexicana species form large perennial colonies which are divided based by communication methods. They have a tendency to form drone congregations, consisting of approximately 132 colonies. The better the environment and the more steady food supply that exists, the more reproductive swarms and more drones are formed. Based on how these swarms align, there are genetically related colonies formed around a mother nest, thus eventually resulting in the drone formation.

=== Colony decline ===
These colonies primarily decline due to deforestation. Due to human alteration of many ecosystems in which these species thrive, there is difficulty in preserving and managing S. mexicana.

== Behavior ==
=== Queen behavior ===
It is thought that S. mexicana detect queens and assess their reproductive status based on olfactory signals. A drone of this species can distinguish a physogastric and virgin queen due to the compounds in the queens head. The queens have been noted to have 2 alcohols and 2 nonanols that distinguish them from the drones as a queen ready for reproduction. The abdomen of the virgin queens specifically maintain compounds to attract drones.

=== Mating selection ===
Queens of these species are monandrous and have a single mate in the start of a colony cycle. S. mexicana specifically creates drone congregations in order to avoid inbreeding. In this species it is noted that drones are composed of up to 132 various colonies that all maintain varied genes and fitnesses. Male bees from nearby colonies are noted to avoid joining congregations closer to them in an effort to reduce chances of mating with a sister or a close relative. This form of disassortive mating proves an effective behavioral mating system given that the probability of sister-brother mating is decreased and eventually a drone aggregation is able to fission in to many genetically diverse colonies.

=== Within species communication ===
These bees have been observed to indicate the presence or lack thereof of food through visual or olfactory marks. Certain forager species choose olfactory marks to indicate specifically rich food sources. Depending on the resources shape and color there are different responses and communication behaviors exhibited by the bee. Additionally, this behavior decreases the competition between nest mates because the bees are able to exploit and find new food sources using their olfactory and visual senses. Individuals tend to leave a scent of food in order to advertise when there is food whether it is far or close to the colony, which helps to indicate to other species the level of competition for such a small or large amount of food.

== Kin selection ==
=== Genetic relatedness within colonies ===
Workers within the same colony all have one of two maternal alleles, which guarantees relatedness as offspring of the same queen. This species chooses to forms drones in order to encourage outbreeding which increases the fitness of the colony unlike inbreeding.

=== Costs and benefits of sociality ===
As a eusocial species, it has been observed that S. mexicana occasionally exemplify foraging behavior. Additionally, S. mexicana have been seen recruiting nestmates in order to enhance overall communication to enhance food behavior and food consumption.

=== Worker queen conflict ===
Given that S. mexicana are monandrous, the genotypes of the workers of each individual colonies does indicate a single patriline, indicated by one paternal allele that each worker carries. Therefore, it is thought that the queen is inseminated by males in order to create more workers with each colony cycle, but the workers themselves are not encouraged by the queen to lay eggs. In a monogamous setting, workers produce males in order to help maximize patrilines and pass on their own genes rather than laying females, a feature that the queen has been noted to prevent. This species is considered common and abundant throughout Mexico and has been noted to thrive in tropical environments.

== Human importance ==
Because this species produces honey and pollen, there is ongoing research to understand the potential utility of managing the species.

=== Agriculture ===
S. mexicana are considered to be crop pollinators, as they forage for nectar on crop plants including Pimenta dioica and Coffea arabica. S. mexicana has preference for the following plants as sources of nectar and pollen:

- Ageratum houstonianum
- Heliocarpus donell-smithii
- Miconia argentea
- Piper sp.

=== Honey production ===
S. mexicana production of honey and pollen has been important all across the Yucatan Peninsula. S. mexicana is sometimes kept in apiaries when domesticated in order to maximize honey production for commercial use, and the honey of this species has been used in traditional medicine to treat illnesses ranging from coughs and throat aches to cancers and infertility.
