= Trigonisca duckei =

Scientific classification
- Domain: Eukaryota
- Kingdom: Animalia
- Phylum: Arthropoda
- Class: Insecta
- Order: Hymenoptera
- Family: Apidae
- Genus: Trigonisca
- Species: T. duckei

Binomial name
- Trigonisca duckei (Friese, 1900)

Species of bee

Trigonisca duckei is a species of eusocial stingless bee in the family Apidae and tribe Meliponini.

== See also ==
- Leurotrigona muelleri
