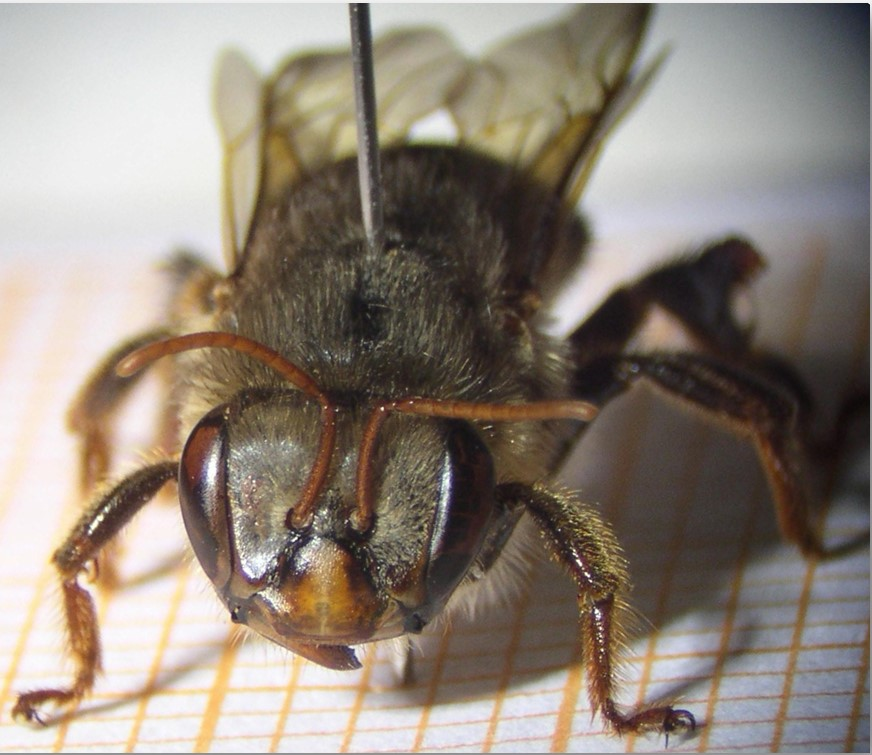

Scientific classification
- Domain: Eukaryota
- Kingdom: Animalia
- Phylum: Arthropoda
- Class: Insecta
- Order: Hymenoptera
- Family: Apidae
- Genus: Melipona
- Species: M. capixaba

Binomial name
- Melipona capixaba (Moure & Camargo, 1994)
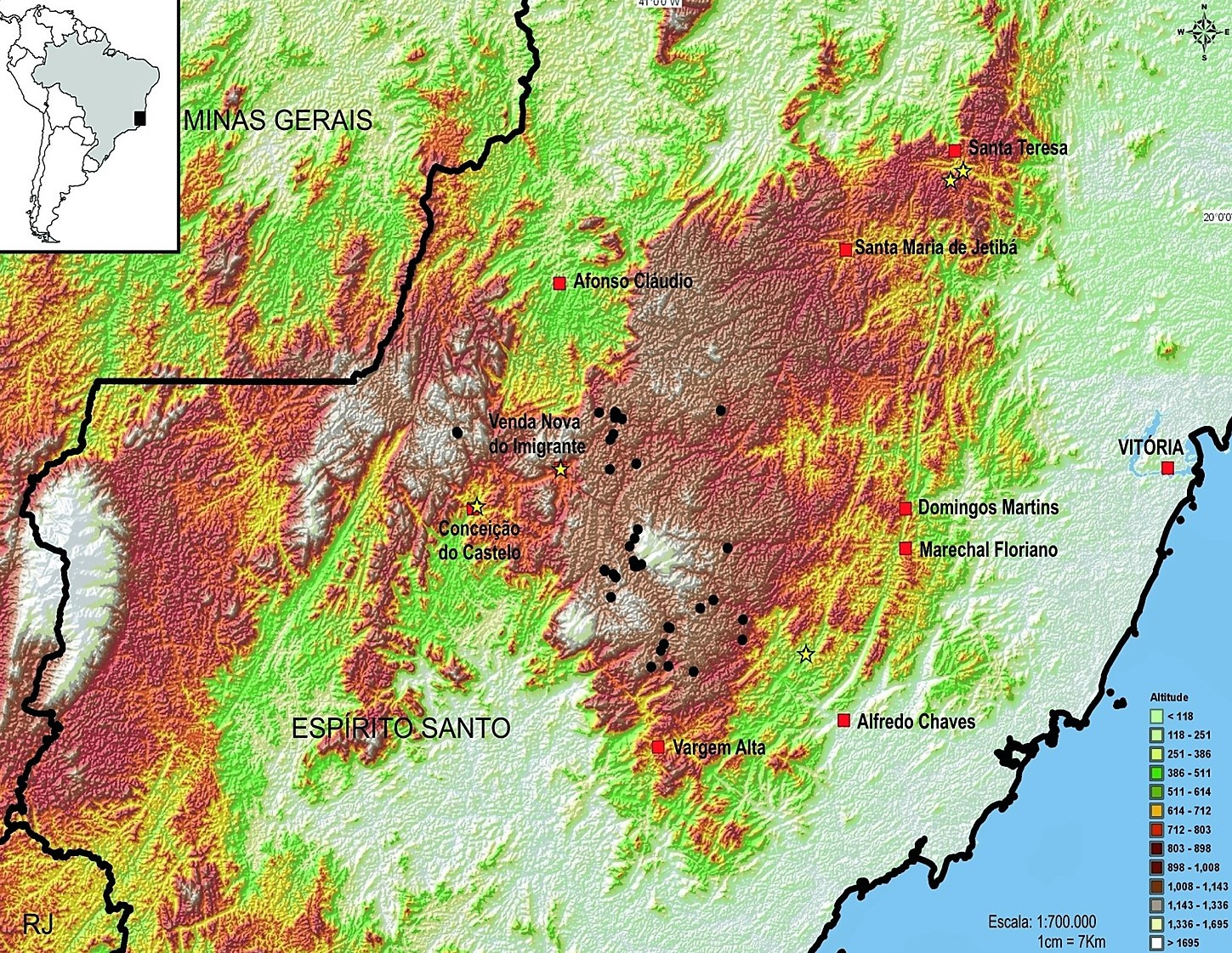
- Geographical distribution of Melipona capixaba hives (black spots) in the Espírito Santo State, Brazil

= Melipona capixaba =

Species of bee

Melipona capixaba, commonly known as uruçu negra (black uruçu) in Brazil, is a species of eusocial stingless bees of the order Hymenoptera. It is endemic to the mountainous region of the State of Espírito Santo, Brazil. Since 2003, it has been included on the list of threatened species produced by the Brazilian Ministry of the Environment, and is the only eusocial insect on this list.

The bee is responsible for pollinating orchids within its distribution. In Espírito Santo, it is considered as a flagship species and has been used to raise awareness about the environmental impacts caused by deforestation.

== Etymology ==
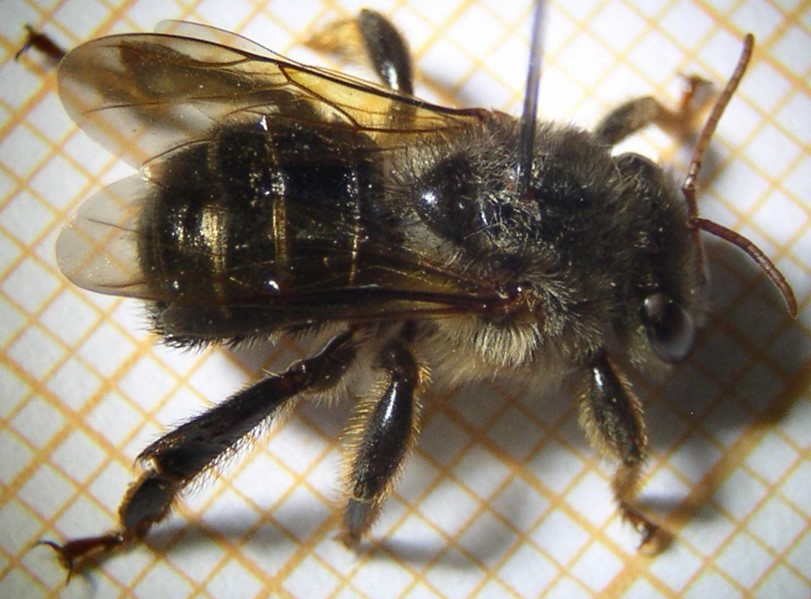
Melipona capixaba

The common name uruçu comes from Tupi "eiru su", which in the indigenous language means "big bee".

== Conservation ==
Due to the endemism and small population size, this species was not discovered until 1994 is now considered “vulnerable to extinction”. Despite its ecological importance as pollinator few studies have examined the ecology and biology of this bee.

Given its endemism, local adaptation and low number of natural colonies, efforts for the conservation of Melipona capixaba should focus on preservation and increasing the number of colonies in the wild, so that M. capixaba can withstand the effects of habitat deforestation in Espírito Santo State.
