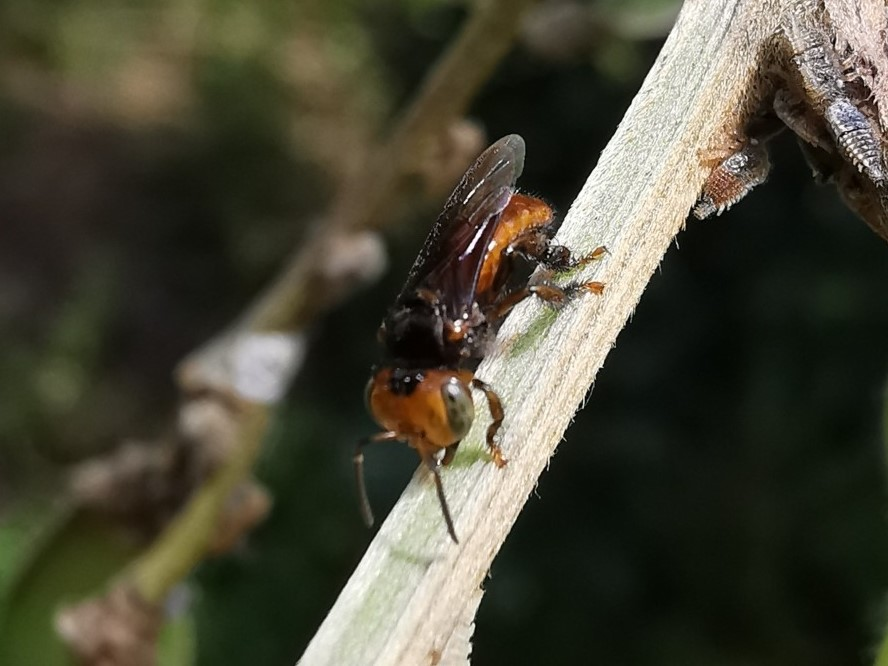

Scientific classification
- Kingdom: Animalia
- Phylum: Arthropoda
- Class: Insecta
- Order: Hymenoptera
- Family: Apidae
- Genus: Oxytrigona
- Species: O. tataira

Binomial name
- Oxytrigona tataira (Smith, 1863)

= Oxytrigona tataira =

Species of bee

Oxytrigona tataira, commonly known as the tataíra or abelha-de-fogo (Brazilian Portuguese: "fire bee"), is a species of eusocial stingless bee in the family Apidae and tribe Meliponini.
