= Melipona compressipes =

Scientific classification
- Domain: Eukaryota
- Kingdom: Animalia
- Phylum: Arthropoda
- Class: Insecta
- Order: Hymenoptera
- Family: Apidae
- Genus: Melipona
- Species: M. compressipes

Binomial name
- Melipona compressipes (Fabricius, 1804)

Synonyms
- Melikerria compressipes

Species of bee

Melipona compressipes, commonly known as tiúba in Brazil, is a species of eusocial stingless bee in the family Apidae and tribe Meliponini.
