= Nogueirapis =

Scientific classification
- Domain: Eukaryota
- Kingdom: Animalia
- Phylum: Arthropoda
- Class: Insecta
- Order: Hymenoptera
- Family: Apidae
- Tribe: Meliponini
- Genus: Nogueirapis; Moure, 1953

Genus of bees

Nogueirapis is a genus of bees belonging to the family Apidae.

The species of this genus are found in Southern America.

Species:

- Nogueirapis batistai Nogueira, Ribeiro & Oliveira, 2020
- Nogueirapis butteli (Friese, 1900)
- Nogueirapis costaricana Ayala & Engel, 2014
- Nogueirapis minor (Moure & Camargo, 1982)
- Nogueirapis mirandula (Cockerell, 1917)
- Nogueirapis rosariae Nogueira, Ribeiro & Oliveira, 2020
