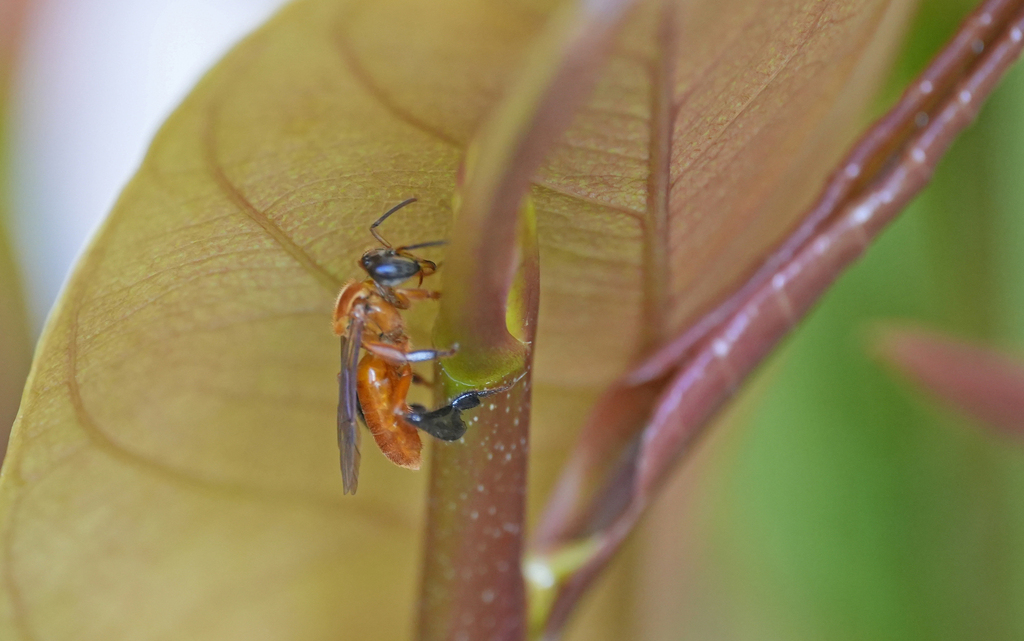

Scientific classification
- Kingdom: Animalia
- Phylum: Arthropoda
- Clade: Pancrustacea
- Class: Insecta
- Order: Hymenoptera
- Family: Apidae
- Tribe: Meliponini
- Genus: Camargoia; Moure, 1989

= Camargoia =

Genus of bees

Camargoia is a genus of bees belonging to the family Apidae.

The species of this genus are found in Southern America.

Species:

- Camargoia camargoi Moure, 1989;
- Camargoia nordestina Camargo, 1996;
- Camargoia pilicornis (Ducke, 1911).
