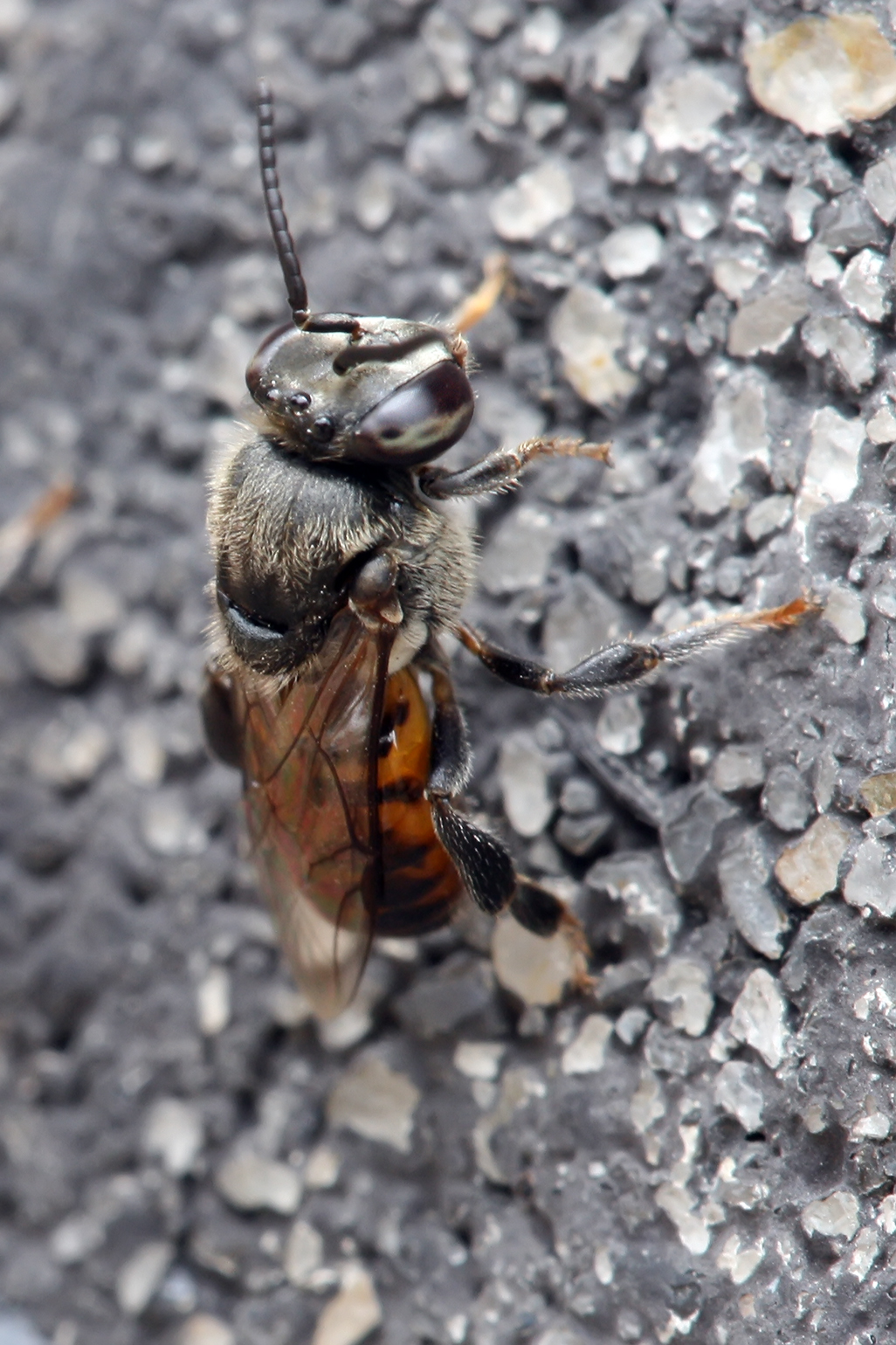
- Meliponula ferruginea

Scientific classification
- Kingdom: Animalia
- Phylum: Arthropoda
- Class: Insecta
- Order: Hymenoptera
- Family: Apidae
- Tribe: Meliponini
- Genus: Meliponula; Cockerell, 1934

Species
- Meliponula beccarii; Meliponula bocandei; Meliponula ferruginea; Meliponula lendliana; Meliponula nebulata

= Meliponula =

Genus of bees

Meliponula is a genus of stingless bees found in sub-Saharan Africa. They are small, with sizes ranging from 2mm to 8mm depending on the species. They provide honey, which in some species is considered to have medicinal properties. These bees are thought to be important pollinators. They are also very common in African countries such as Kakamega forest and Taita hills in Kenya. They are known to commonly nest in trees indigenous to these areas, but occasionally nest in window frames, door panels and roof loggings made of wood. They are particularly threatened by drastic increases in anthropogenic activities in forested areas.
