= Tetragonisca =

- Tetragonisca fiebrigi in southern Brazil

Scientific classification
- Kingdom: Animalia
- Phylum: Arthropoda
- Clade: Pancrustacea
- Class: Insecta
- Order: Hymenoptera
- Family: Apidae
- Clade: Corbiculata
- Tribe: Meliponini
- Genus: Tetragonisca; Moure, 1946

Genus of bees

Tetragonisca is a genus of stingless bees in the family Apidae. There are at least four described species in Tetragonisca, found in Central and South America.

== Species ==
These four species belong to the genus Tetragonisca:

- Tetragonisca angustula (Latreille, 1825)
- Tetragonisca buchwaldi (Friese, 1925)
- Tetragonisca fiebrigi (Schwarz, 1938)
- Tetragonisca weyrauchi (Schwarz, 1943)
