= Dolichotrigona =

Scientific classification
- Domain: Eukaryota
- Kingdom: Animalia
- Phylum: Arthropoda
- Class: Insecta
- Order: Hymenoptera
- Family: Apidae
- Tribe: Meliponini
- Genus: Dolichotrigona; Moure, 1950

Genus of bees

Dolichotrigona is a genus of bees belonging to the family Apidae.

Species:

- Dolichotrigona longitarsis (Ducke, 1916).
- Dolichotrigona martinezi (Brèthes, 1920)
- Dolichotrigona schulthessi (Fritasse, 1900)
- Dolichotrigona mendersoni Camargo & Pedro 2005.
- Dolichotrigona clavicornis Camargo & Pedro 2005
- Dolichotrigona rondoni Camargo & Pedro 2005
- Dolichotrigona tavaresi Camargo & Pedro 2005
- Dolichotrigona browni Camargo & Pedro 2005
- Dolichotrigona moratoi Camargo & Pedro 2005
- Dolichotrigona chachapoya Camargo & Pedro 2005
