= Duckeola =

Scientific classification
- Domain: Eukaryota
- Kingdom: Animalia
- Phylum: Arthropoda
- Class: Insecta
- Order: Hymenoptera
- Family: Apidae
- Tribe: Meliponini
- Genus: Duckeola; Moure, 1944

Genus of bees

Duckeola is a genus of bees belonging to the family Apidae.

The species of this genus are found in Southern America.

Species:

- Duckeola ghilianii (Spinola, 1853)
- Duckeola pavani (Moure, 1963)
