= Celetrigona =

Scientific classification
- Domain: Eukaryota
- Kingdom: Animalia
- Phylum: Arthropoda
- Class: Insecta
- Order: Hymenoptera
- Family: Apidae
- Tribe: Meliponini
- Genus: Celetrigona; Moure, 1950

Genus of bees

Celetrigona is a genus of bees belonging to the family Apidae.

Species:

- Celetrigona euclydiana
- Celetrigona hirsuticornis
- Celetrigona longicornis
