= Trichotrigona =

Scientific classification
- Kingdom: Animalia
- Phylum: Arthropoda
- Class: Insecta
- Order: Hymenoptera
- Family: Apidae
- Tribe: Meliponini
- Genus: Trichotrigona; Camargo & Moure, 1983

Genus of bees

Trichotrigona is a genus of bees belonging to the family Apidae.

The species of this genus are found in Southern America.

Species:

- Trichotrigona camargoiana Pedro & Cordeiro, 2015
- Trichotrigona extranea Camargo & Moure, 1983
