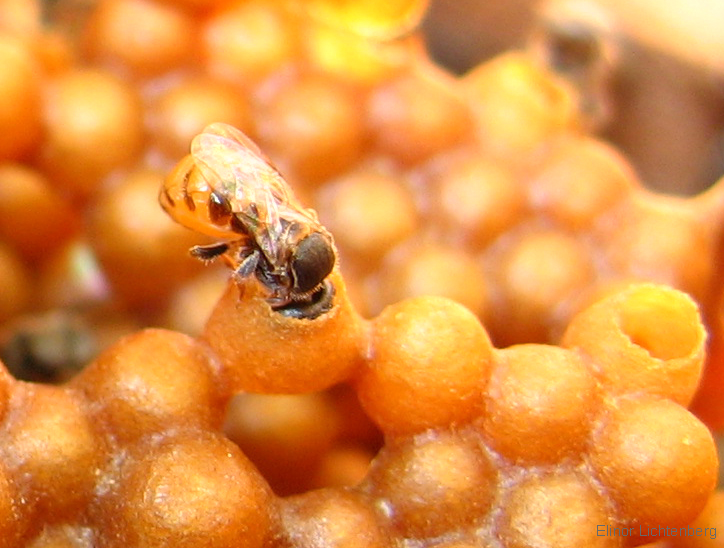
- Friesella schrottkyi

Scientific classification
- Domain: Eukaryota
- Kingdom: Animalia
- Phylum: Arthropoda
- Class: Insecta
- Order: Hymenoptera
- Family: Apidae
- Tribe: Meliponini
- Genus: Friesella

= Friesella =

Genus of bees

Friesella is a genus of bees belonging to the family Apidae.

The species of this genus are found in South America.

Species:

- Friesella schrottkyi (Friese, 1900)
