= Tetragonula mellipes =

Scientific classification
- Kingdom: Animalia
- Phylum: Arthropoda
- Class: Insecta
- Order: Hymenoptera
- Family: Apidae
- Tribe: Meliponini
- Genus: Tetragonula
- Species: T. mellipes

Binomial name
- Tetragonula mellipes Friese, 1898
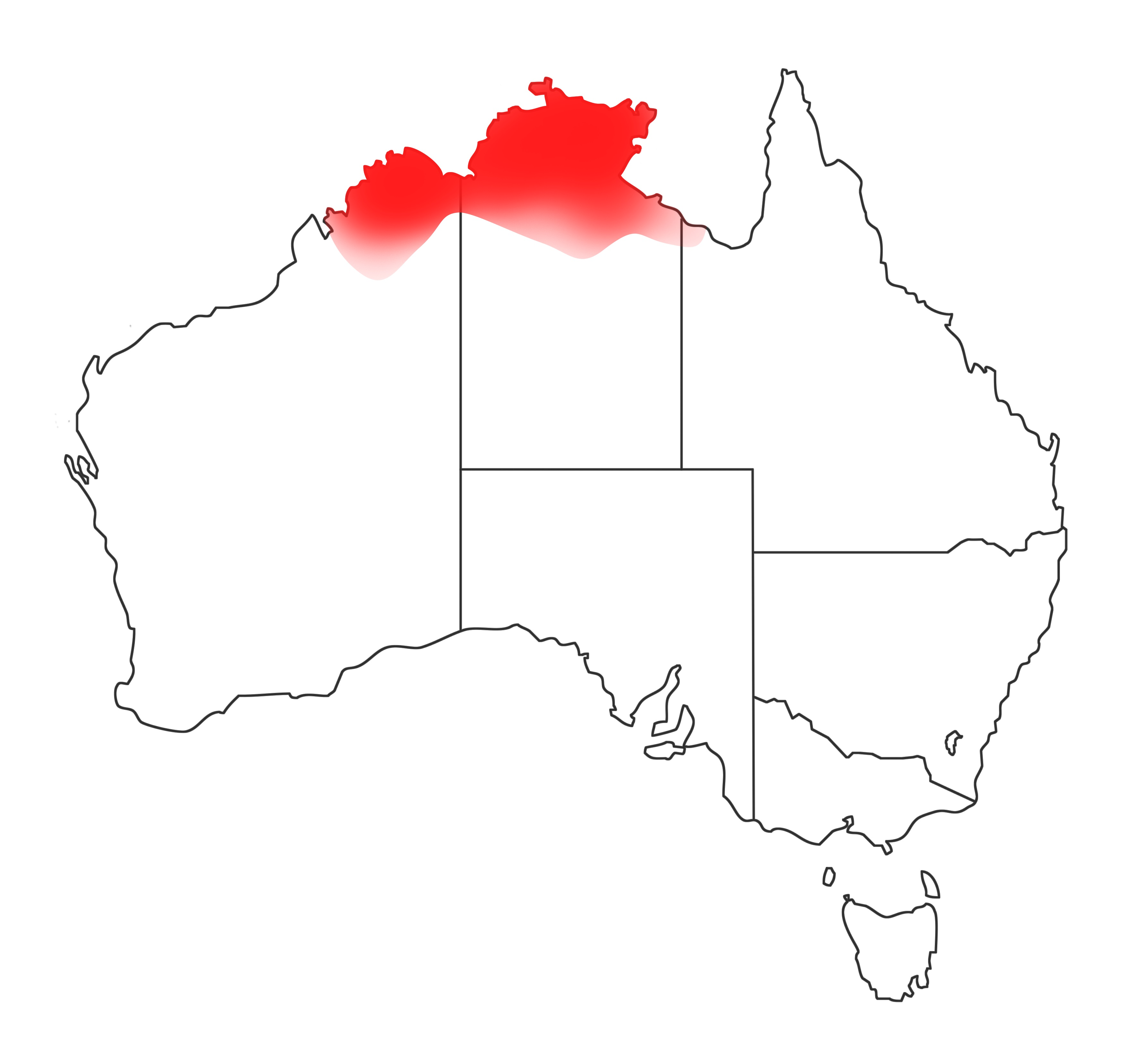
- Map showing the estimated current distribution of T. mellipes in Australia

Synonyms
- Trigona mellipes Friese, 1898; Trigona (Tetragona) mellipes Michener, 1965

Species of stingless bee

Tetragonula mellipes is a small eusocial stingless bee first described by Friese in 1898 and it is found in Northern Australia (Northern areas of Western Australia and Northern Territory).

== Description and identification ==
The workers (3.6-4.3mm) are pale brown with sides of the thorax (Mesopleuron and metapleuron) densely and evenly covered with fine, short hair. Male drone body colour is very similar to the workers. T. mellipes is distinctly smaller than the sympatric T. hockingsi in most characters. However, it is similar to the apparently allopatric T. carbonaria, except it has shorter wings. Furthermore, when alive, the eyes are paler in colour compared to the darker eyes of T. carbonaria and T. hockingsi.

== Nest building ==
The nests of T. mellipes are irregular and small. T. mellipes can be found nesting in small cavities inside trees and stone walls. It has a semi-comb arrangement of brood. The brood is also smaller, typically being less than half a litre compared with the average 2 litres of its relatives. Most T. mellipes nests have external entrance tunnels and some nests may have more than one entrance (up to four).
