= Megachile phaseoli =

Scientific classification
- Domain: Eukaryota
- Kingdom: Animalia
- Phylum: Arthropoda
- Class: Insecta
- Order: Hymenoptera
- Family: Megachilidae
- Genus: Megachile
- Species: M. phaseoli

Binomial name
- Megachile phaseoli Moure, 1977

Species of leafcutter bee (Megachile)

Megachile phaseoli is a species of bee in the family Megachilidae. It was described by Moure in 1977.
