= Megachile subcingulata =

Scientific classification
- Domain: Eukaryota
- Kingdom: Animalia
- Phylum: Arthropoda
- Class: Insecta
- Order: Hymenoptera
- Family: Megachilidae
- Genus: Megachile
- Species: M. subcingulata

Binomial name
- Megachile subcingulata Moure, 1945

Species of leafcutter bee (Megachile)

Megachile subcingulata is a species of bee in the family Megachilidae. It was described by Padre Jesus Santiago Moure in 1945.
