= Megachile trichrootricha =

Scientific classification
- Domain: Eukaryota
- Kingdom: Animalia
- Phylum: Arthropoda
- Class: Insecta
- Order: Hymenoptera
- Family: Megachilidae
- Genus: Megachile
- Species: M. trichrootricha

Binomial name
- Megachile trichrootricha Moure, 1953

Species of leafcutter bee (Megachile)

Megachile trichrootricha is a species of bee in the family Megachilidae. It was described by Moure in 1953.
