= Megachile bridarollii =

Scientific classification
- Domain: Eukaryota
- Kingdom: Animalia
- Phylum: Arthropoda
- Class: Insecta
- Order: Hymenoptera
- Family: Megachilidae
- Genus: Megachile
- Species: M. bridarollii

Binomial name
- Megachile bridarollii Moure, 1947

Species of leafcutter bee (Megachile)

Megachile bridarollii is a species of bee in the family Megachilidae. It was described by Moure in 1947.
