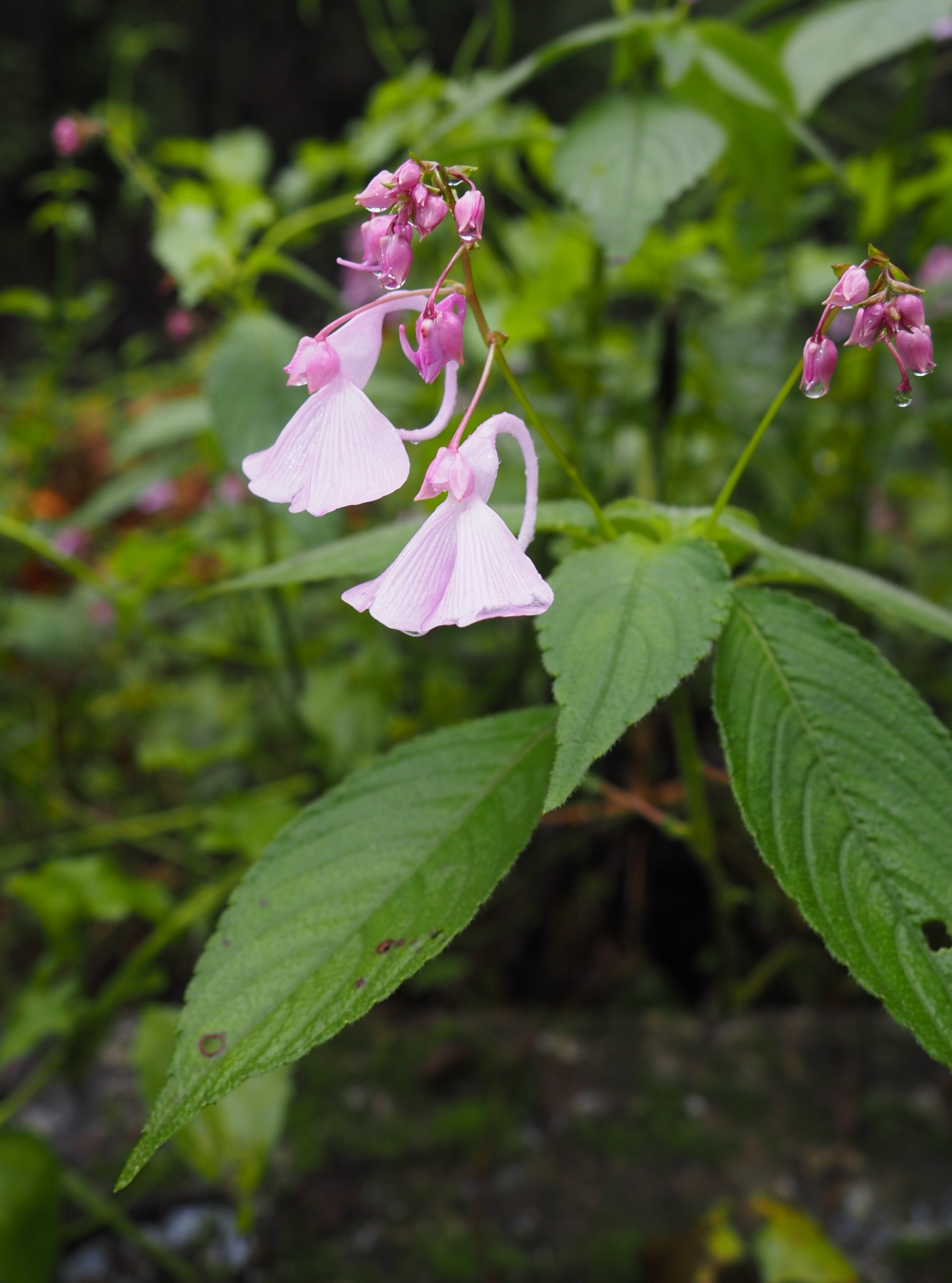

Scientific classification
- Kingdom: Plantae
- Clade: Tracheophytes
- Clade: Angiosperms
- Clade: Eudicots
- Clade: Asterids
- Order: Ericales
- Family: Balsaminaceae
- Genus: Impatiens
- Species: I. maculata

Binomial name
- Impatiens maculata Wight

= Impatiens maculata =

Species of plant

Impatiens maculata is a species of balsam endemic to the southern Western Ghats of India. The low herb grows to a maximum height of a metre and is usually found on wet soils in stream edges and sholas between 700 and 1000 m above sea level in small groups. The pink flowers are produced in a pair or a cluster and the spur is about 3 to 5 cm long. The plants sprout after the first rains in June and begin to flower from July to October and sometimes until December. A few individuals flower out of the season. They are pollinated mainly by bees of the genera Apis and Tetragonula.
