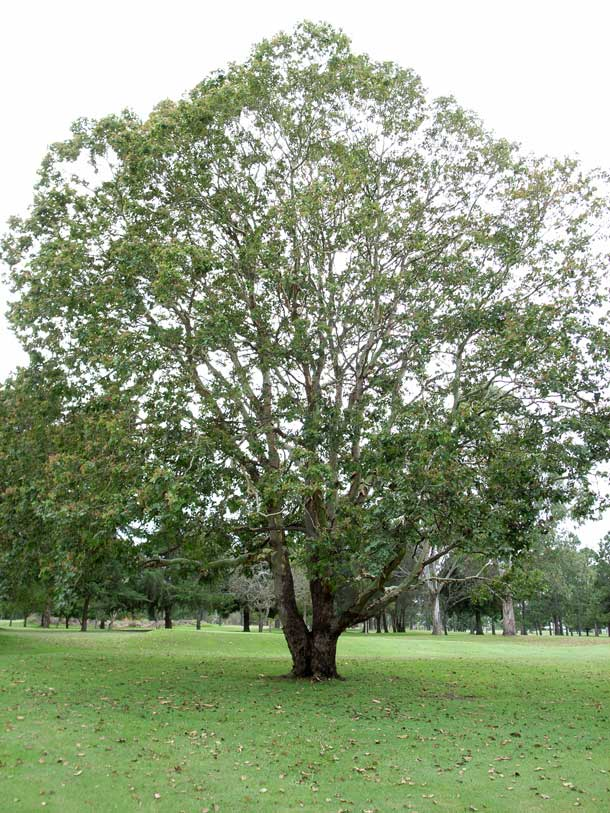
- Corymbia torelliana at Urunga, New South Wales

Scientific classification
- Kingdom: Plantae
- Clade: Embryophytes
- Clade: Tracheophytes
- Clade: Spermatophytes
- Clade: Angiosperms
- Clade: Eudicots
- Clade: Rosids
- Order: Myrtales
- Family: Myrtaceae
- Genus: Corymbia
- Species: C. torelliana

Binomial name
- Corymbia torelliana (F.Muell.) K.D.Hill & L.A.S.Johnson

Synonyms
- Eucalyptus torelliana F.Muell.

= Corymbia torelliana =

Cadaghi

Species of plant

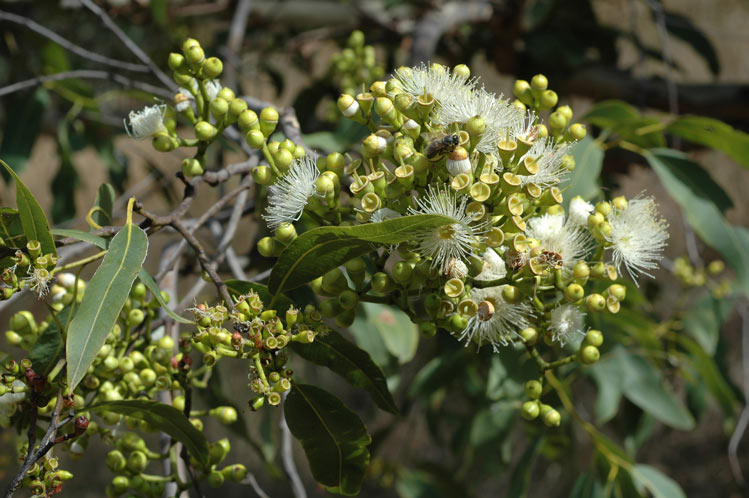
Flower buds

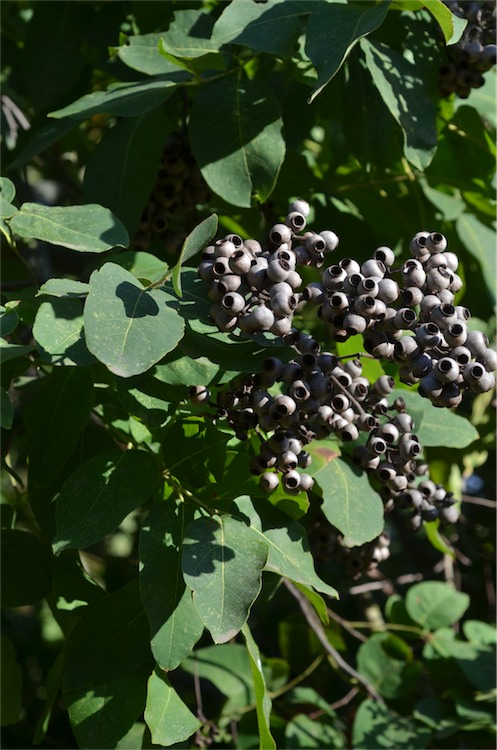
Fruit

Corymbia torelliana, commonly known as cadaghi or cadaga, is a species of tree that is endemic to north Queensland. It has smooth, greenish grey to white bark, rough at the base of older trees, egg-shaped, heart-shaped or lance-shaped adult leaves, flower buds in groups of three or seven, white flowers and urn-shaped or shortened spherical fruit.

== Description ==
Corymbia torelliana typically grows to a height of 25–30 metres (82–98 ft) and forms a lignotuber. It has smooth greenish grey to white bark, although older specimens often have rough, tessellated, greyish bark on the lower trunk. Young plants and coppice regrowth have heart-shaped to egg-shaped or elliptical leaves that are glossy green on the upper surface, paler below, 90–145 mm (3.5–5.7 in) long and 60–105 mm (2.4–4.1 in) wide. Adult leaves are arranged alternately, paler on the lower surface, egg-shaped to heart-shaped or lance-shaped, 60–160 mm (2.4–6.3 in) long and 15–85 mm (0.59–3.35 in) wide on a petiole 10–24 mm (0.39–0.94 in) long. There are many small oil dots visible to the naked eye.

The flower buds are arranged on the ends of branchlets on a branched peduncle 5–24 mm (0.20–0.94 in) long, each branch of the peduncle with three or seven buds that are sessile or on pedicels up to 5 mm (0.20 in) long. Mature buds are oval, 7–8 mm (0.28–0.31 in) long and 5–7 mm (0.20–0.28 in) wide with a rounded, conical or slightly beaked operculum. Flowering occurs from August to November and the flowers are white. The fruit is a woody urn-shaped or shortened spherical capsule 9–14 mm (0.35–0.55 in) long and 8–14 mm (0.31–0.55 in) wide with the valves enclosed in the fruit.

== Taxonomy and naming ==
Cadaghi was first formally described in 1877 by Ferdinand von Mueller who gave it the name Eucalyptus torelliana and published the description in his book Fragmenta phytographiae Australiae. The type specimens were collected near Trinity Bay by Eugene Fitzalan. In 1995, Ken Hill and Lawrie Johnson changed the name to Corymbia torelliana, publishing the change in the journal Telopea. The specific epithet (torelliana) honours "Count Luigi Torelli", who proposed using water-loving eucalypts to reduce the incidence of malaria by drying out marshes.

== Distribution and habitat ==
Corymbia torelliana grows in wet sclerophyll forest, on rainforest margins and as an emergent in rainforest. Its natural range is from Cooktown to Ingham and inland as far as the Windsor Tablelands. It has been used as a fast-growing garden and landscaping tree and has established itself beyond its natural distribution.

== Ecology ==
Cadaghi has become naturalised beyond its native range in south-eastern and central Queensland. It is regarded as a weed in south-eastern Queensland where it grows on roadsides, waterways, disturbed sites and waste areas. Its dense canopy often inhibits the growth of understorey species, affecting the composition of native forests in subtropical areas. The sticky resin from the fruiting capsules of this species is collected by the native stingless bee Tetragonula carbonaria, clogging the honeycombs and sometimes sealing the hive entrance and killing the bees inside.

== Conservation status ==
This eucalypt is classified as of "least concern" under the Queensland Government Nature Conservation Act 1992.

== Use in horticulture ==
Cadaghi is a fast growing tree that has been used as a street and garden tree further south than its natural range, including in inland towns such as Narrabri, Chinchilla and Cunnamulla. Its dense canopy of large leaves can provide shade in these places. A sooty fungus that often grows on the tree can discolour objects underneath it. Large branches can sometimes break off and there are serious environmental problems caused by this species in coastal and near-coastal areas. Less invasive alternatives include brush box (Lophostemon confertus), Moreton Bay ash (Corymbia tessellaris) and Queensland maple (Flindersia brayleyana ).

== See also ==
- List of Corymbia species
