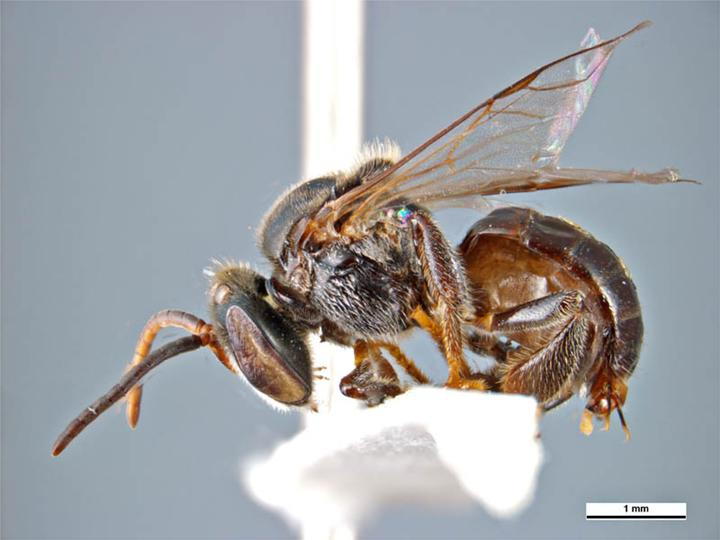
- Tetragonula sapiens
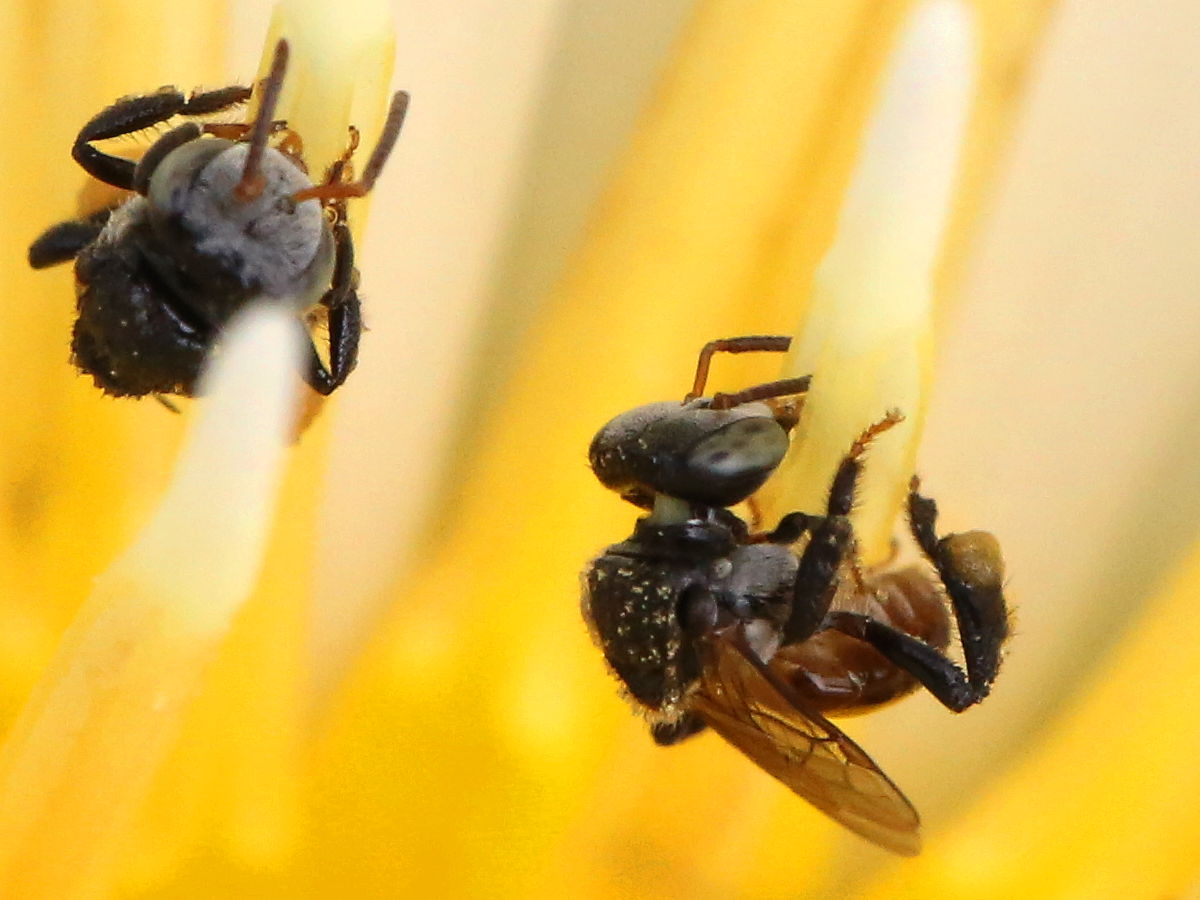
- T. cf. pagdeni, Thailand

Scientific classification
- Kingdom: Animalia
- Phylum: Arthropoda
- Class: Insecta
- Order: Hymenoptera
- Family: Apidae
- Tribe: Meliponini
- Genus: Tetragonula; Moure, 1961

= Tetragonula =

Genus of bees

Tetragonula is a genus of stingless bees. In 1961, Brazilian bee expert J.S. Moure first proposed the genus name Tetragonula to improve the classification system by dividing the large genus Trigona stingless bees into 9 smaller groups. About 30 stingless bee species formerly placed in the genus Trigona are now placed in the genus Tetragonula. These bees are found in Oceania, in countries such as Australia, Indonesia, New Guinea, Malaysia, Thailand, the Philippines, India, Sri Lanka, and the Solomon Islands. The most recent tabulation of species listed 35 species.

== Species ==
Tetragonula

- Tetragonula ashishi (Viraktamath & Roy, 2022)
- Tetragonula atripes (Smith, 1857)
- Tetragonula bengalensis (Cameron, 1897)
- Tetragonula biroi (Friese, 1898)
- Tetragonula carbonaria (Smith, 1854)
- Tetragonula clypearis (Friese, 1908)
- Tetragonula collina (Smith, 1857)
- Tetragonula dapitanensis (Cockerell, 1925)
- Tetragonula davenporti (Franck, 2004)
- Tetragonula drescheri (Schwarz, 1939)
- Tetragonula florilega (Engel, 2021)
- Tetragonula fuscibasis (Cockerell, 1920)
- Tetragonula fuscobalteata (Cameron, 1908)
- Tetragonula geissleri (Cockerell, 1918)
- Tetragonula gressitti (Sakagami, 1978)
- Tetragonula hirashimai (Sakagami, 1978)
- Tetragonula hockingsi (Cockerell, 1929)
- Tetragonula iridipennis (Smith, 1854)
- Tetragonula laeviceps (Smith, 1857)
- Tetragonula malaipanae (Engel, Michener, & Boontop, 2017)
- Tetragonula melanocephala (Gribodo, 1893)
- Tetragonula melina (Gribodo, 1893)
- Tetragonula mellipes (Friese, 1898)
- Tetragonula minangkabau (Sakagami & Inoue, 1985)
- Tetragonula minor (Sakagami, 1978)
- Tetragonula pagdeni (Schwarz, 1939)
- Tetragonula pagdeniformis (Sakagami, 1978)
- Tetragonula penangensis (Cockerell, 1919)
- Tetragonula praeterita (Walker, 1860)
- Tetragonula reepeni (Friese, 1918)
- Tetragonula rufibasalis (Cockerell, 1918)
- Tetragonula ruficornis (Smith, 1870)
- Tetragonula sapiens (Cockerell, 1911)
- Tetragonula sarawakensis (Schwarz, 1937)
- Tetragonula shishirae (Viraktamath & Roy, 2022)
- Tetragonula shubhami (Viraktamath & Roy, 2022)
- Tetragonula sirindhornae (Michener & Boongird, 2004)
- Tetragonula sumae (Viraktamath & Roy, 2022)
- Tetragonula testaceitarsis (Cameron, 1901)
- Tetragonula vikrami (Viraktamath & Roy, 2022)
- Tetragonula zucchii (Sakagami, 1978)
