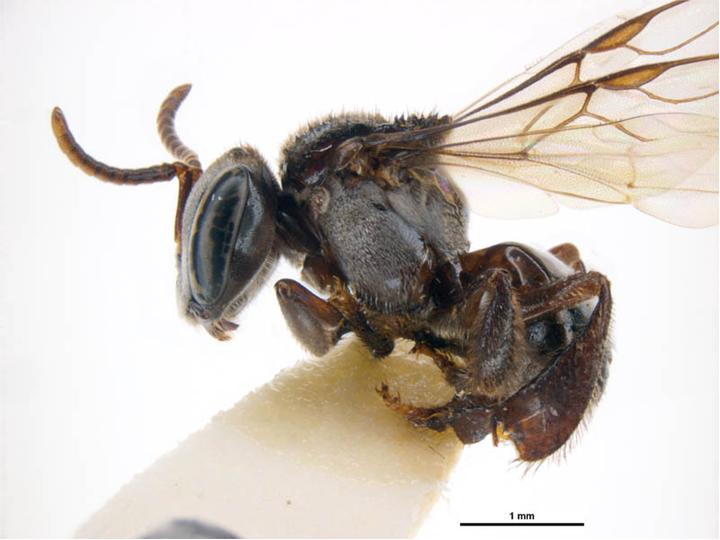

Scientific classification
- Kingdom: Animalia
- Phylum: Arthropoda
- Clade: Pancrustacea
- Class: Insecta
- Order: Hymenoptera
- Family: Apidae
- Genus: Tetragonula
- Species: T. davenporti

Binomial name
- Tetragonula davenporti (Franck, 2004)

Synonyms
- Trigona (Heterotrigona) davenporti Franck et al, 2004

= Tetragonula davenporti =

Species of bee

Tetragonula davenporti is a species of stingless bee in the tribe Meliponini. It is endemic to Australia. It was described in 2004 by entomologist Pierre Franck.

== Distribution and habitat ==
The species occurs in south-eastern Queensland.

== Behaviour ==
The adults are flying mellivores. They are social insects that live in large colonies, with female reproductive and worker castes, building nests of wax and resin in tree trunks, with irregularly arranged brood combs.
