= Tharrhalea prasina =

Scientific classification
- Kingdom: Animalia
- Phylum: Arthropoda
- Subphylum: Chelicerata
- Class: Arachnida
- Order: Araneae
- Infraorder: Araneomorphae
- Family: Thomisidae
- Genus: Tharrhalea
- Species: T. prasina

Binomial name
- Tharrhalea prasina (L. Koch, 1876)

Synonyms
- Diaea prasina L. Koch, 1876; Lehtinelagia prasina (L. Koch, 1876)

Species of crab spider

Tharrhalea prasina, synonym Lehtinelagia prasina, also known as the leek-green flower spider, is a species of crab spider in the family Thomisidae. It is green in colour and usually lives on flowers. T. prasina inhabits the dry grassland and shrublands of Australia and is commonly found in Victoria, NSW, and south Queensland; but it is also rarely found in South Australia or Tasmania.

== Description ==
Tharrhalea prasina, like most other Thomisidae spiders, has longer and stronger two pairs of front legs, and the pattern of their eight eyes is in two rows. The legs and cephalothorax are light green. The average body size is between 4–7 mm (0.2–0.3 in), and females usually have larger body sizes than males. Some L. prasina spiders are green in the abdomen, the same as the cephalothorax, with a white curved pattern, but more have a round white abdomen with brown pattern.

== Hunting and diet ==
Crab spiders are ambush predators, however, they are not venomous or web builder to trap prey. Lehtinelagia spider capture their prey by their strong two pair of front legs. The species in the family of Thomisidae has a wide range of prey, they can usually hunt larger body size of prey than themself including bumblebee and flies. They hide on flowers or grass while waiting for insects to come closer. Tharrhalea prasina can also change its colour to fit the background, which can avoid the detection of either predators or prey.

== Taxonomy ==
Tharrhalea prasina was first described by arachnologist Ludwig Carl Christian Koch in 1876 in Queensland as Diaea prasina. T. prasina belongs to the crab spider family, which is Thomisidae.
