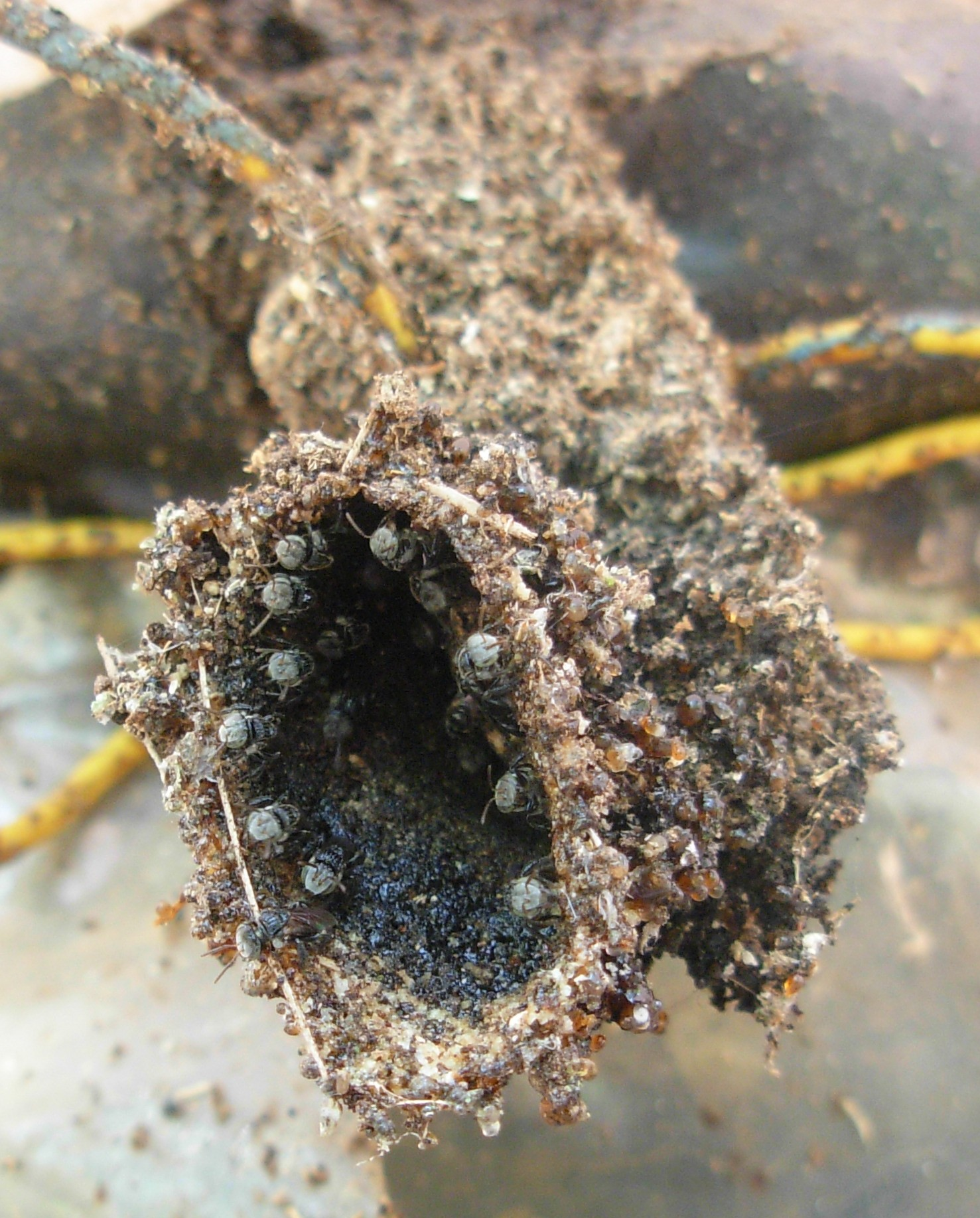
- A hive of Tetragonula iridipennis

Scientific classification
- Kingdom: Animalia
- Phylum: Arthropoda
- Class: Insecta
- Order: Hymenoptera
- Family: Apidae
- Genus: Tetragonula
- Species: T. iridipennis

Binomial name
- Tetragonula iridipennis Smith, 1854
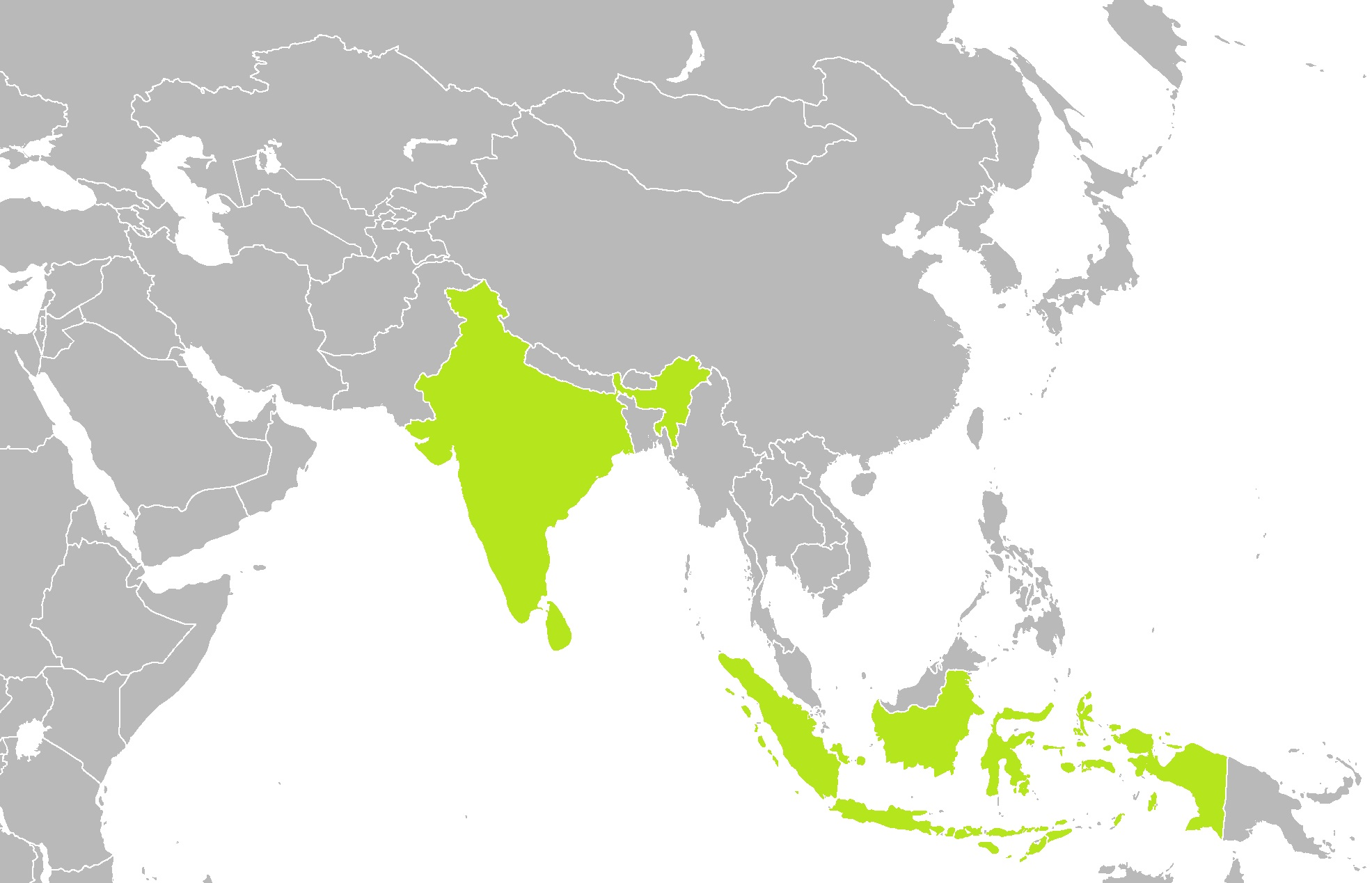
- It is found in India, Sri Lanka, and Indonesia

Synonyms
- Trigona iridipennis Smith, 1854; Trigona (Tetragonula) iridipennis Smith, 1854; Trigona (Heterotrigona) iridipennis Smith, 1854; Melipona iridipennis Auctt.

= Tetragonula iridipennis =

Species of bee

The Indian stingless bee or dammar bee, Tetragonula iridipennis, is a species of bee belonging to the family Apidae, subfamily Apinae. It was first described by Frederick Smith in 1854 who found the species in what is now the island of Sri Lanka. Many older references erroneously placed this species in Melipona, an unrelated genus from the New World, and until recently it was placed in Trigona, therefore still often mistakenly referred to as Trigona iridipennis. For centuries, colonies of T. iridipennis have been kept in objects such as clay pots so that their highly prized medicinal honey can be utilized.

== Taxonomy and phylogenetics ==
Tetragonula iridipennis belongs to the complex genus of stingless bees Tetragonula which contains more than 30 described species from the Indian subcontinent. Until recently, all species in the group were treated as belonging to the single genus "Trigona". Tetragonula iridipennis belongs to the smaller Iridipennis species group which includes four primary species: Tetragonula iridipennis, Tetragonula praeterita, Tetragonula ruficornis, and Tetragonula bengalensis. These four species were proposed in the 19th century and were poorly characterized. They have since not been directly compared via molecular studies; therefore there is uncertainty about whether they are in fact separate species.

== Description and identification ==
Like other bees in its sub-species group, T. iridipennis can be identified by its dark mesoscutum or middle thorax region with four distinct hair bands separated by broad glabrous interspaces. It can be further distinguished from other species in its sub group by its chestnut-brown colored mandible which does not have a black apical area and a few dark brown erect setae or hair-like structures on the margin of its scutellum. Other species in the subgroup have yellow mandibles which have black apical areas and have light colored setae on their scutella. Based on studies of workers, T. indipennis has a total body length ranging from 3.5 to 4.0 mm and an entire body which is black to blackish brown. Size differences as well as male genitalia are key for identifying the species. They are relatively small sized bees and the male penis valve is very robust and tapers only at the apex. Male genitalia are also key to differentiating between male and female bees because the two sexes are very similar in size and color.

== Distribution and habitat ==
T. iridipennis is a tropical bee species and is found throughout the Indo-Malay region. Its range was once thought to go as far as the Solomon and Caroline islands, but unlike other Tetragonula species, its range is fairly limited. Although it was originally discovered on the island of Sri Lanka, it is predominantly found in India. Specifically, studies have been conducted on T. iridipennis colonies located in Karnataka, Kerala, and Tamil Nadu. T. iridipennis also occurs on the islands of Indonesia where it is a natural pollinator.

== Colony cycle ==
As with other highly eusocial bee species, T. iridipennis colonies are founded by swarming. However, this process is different for stingless bees like T. iridipennis and honey bees. In honeybees, the process is abrupt and a large group of workers leaves the original colony with the old queen, thus few connections are maintained between the old and the new colonies. The process is more gradual for stingless bees such as T. iridepennis. First scout workers from the original nest find a new nest site and gradually transport resources there from the mother colony. A virgin queen from the mother colony then arrives usually accompanied by a mass of workers. It is only after several days to half a year that relations between the mother and daughter colonies are severed.

== Behavior ==
=== Mating behavior ===
Like males in other stingless bee species, there is tremendous competition between T. iridipennis males to copulate with virgin queens. Males have been observed to form large aggregations and to engage in mass flights near nests waiting for the emergence of virgin females. Once a virgin queen emerges, it pairs with one of the males and a mating flight ensues, resulting in the fertilization of the queen.

== Life history ==
=== Males ===
While no detailed studies have been done on colony composition of T. iridipennis nests, in keeping with other stingless bee species, it is expected that the total number of males produced per colony is lower than that of workers. In some tropical species, male stingless bees stay for an extended time in nests. They then leave the nests and form aggregations.

== Camouflage ==
=== Nest ===
Common nesting sites include tree trunks, logs and wall cavities. The nests are relatively low to the ground and are constructed at heights between 1.93 meters and 2.2 meters from the ground. Nests tend to be dark brown in color in order to blend in with their surroundings. The Indian tree species Cycas sphaerica appears to be an important nest provider for T. iridipennis.

== Interactions with other species ==
=== Diet ===
T. iridipennis collects nectar from many herbal plants such as the coco palm and the Jackfruit tree. They also collect sap from tree species such as Cycas sphaerica.

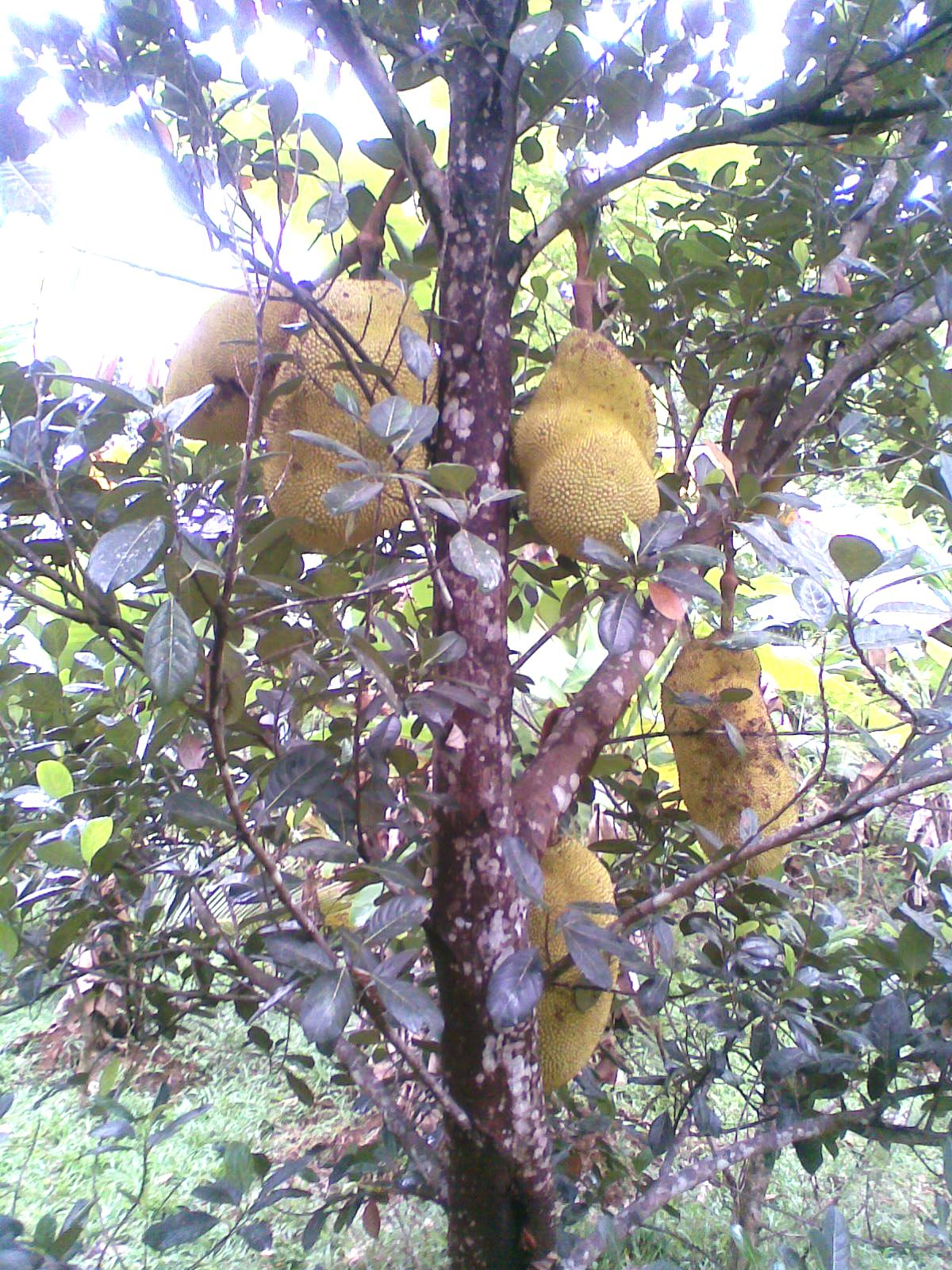
Tetragonula iridipennis feeds on the nectar of the Jack fruit tree

=== Predators ===
The centipede species Scolopendra hardwickei is a specialized predator for stingless bee species like T. iridipennis. Predators like spiders, flies, wasps, and lizards are also a constant threat to T. iridipennis colonies because they invade nests to eat their rich honey stores. T. iridipennis defends against these predators by preventing access to its nest. It seals pores of the hive with a substance created by mixing its own salivary gland secretions with plant-derived resins. This substance called propolis also has favorable mechanical properties and is used by T. iridipennis to protect its nest from wind and rain.

== Human importance ==
=== Agriculture ===
While they are currently not widely utilized as agricultural pollinators in South Asia, a study by Ramadhani et al. indicates that T. iridipennis can potentially be applied as pollinator agents for tomato farming as opposed to non-native honey bees such as the European honey bee (Apis mellifera L.) While they were shown to exhibit lower pollination efficiency, fruit sizes were not significantly affected. In addition, their low price and their harmlessness make them ideal candidates for low income farmers or those concerned about the safety risk associated with stinging honey bees.

=== Medicinal honey ===
T. iridipennis stores its honey in pots which are within a food storage zone of the nest. The nest is constructed using a mixture of wax, resin and mud sometimes and that is known as cerumen. The food storage zone contains a honey storage pot and a pollen storage pot, but these are often intermixed. The honey of T. iridipennis is a rich source of antioxidant flavanoids. This is because workers collect honey from medicinally important herbal plants and flowers. The quantity of honey produced is relatively small at 600-700 grams per year.

=== Propolis ===
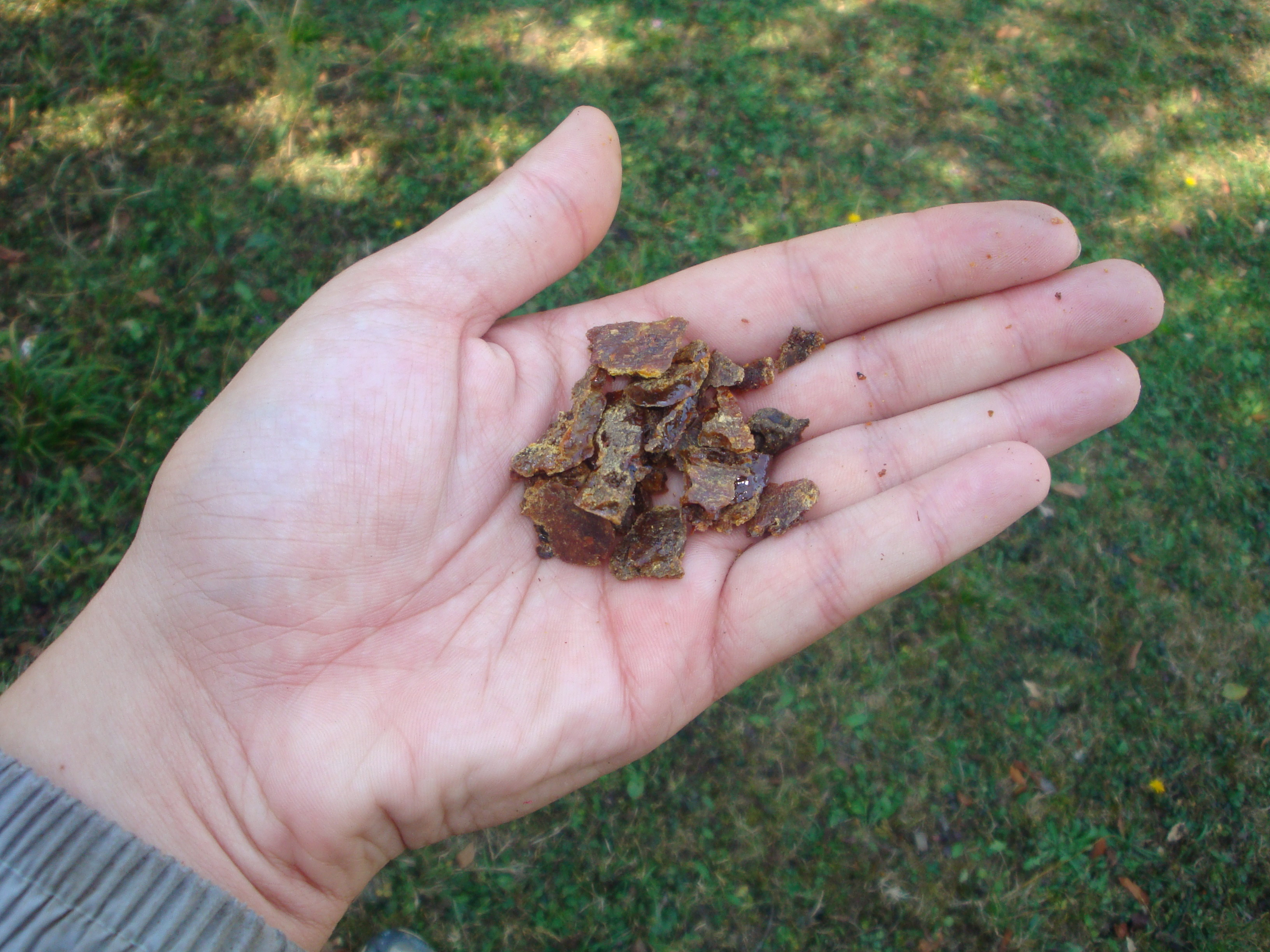
Tetragonula iridipennis propolis

While T. iridipennis gathers propolis to reinforce its nest, people have harvested it for supposed pharmacological activities. Some samples of propolis have been found to exhibit antibacterial and antiviral properties.
