= Tharrhalea albipes =

Scientific classification
- Kingdom: Animalia
- Phylum: Arthropoda
- Subphylum: Chelicerata
- Class: Arachnida
- Order: Araneae
- Infraorder: Araneomorphae
- Family: Thomisidae
- Genus: Tharrhalea
- Species: T. albipes

Binomial name
- Tharrhalea albipes L. Koch, 1875

Species of spider

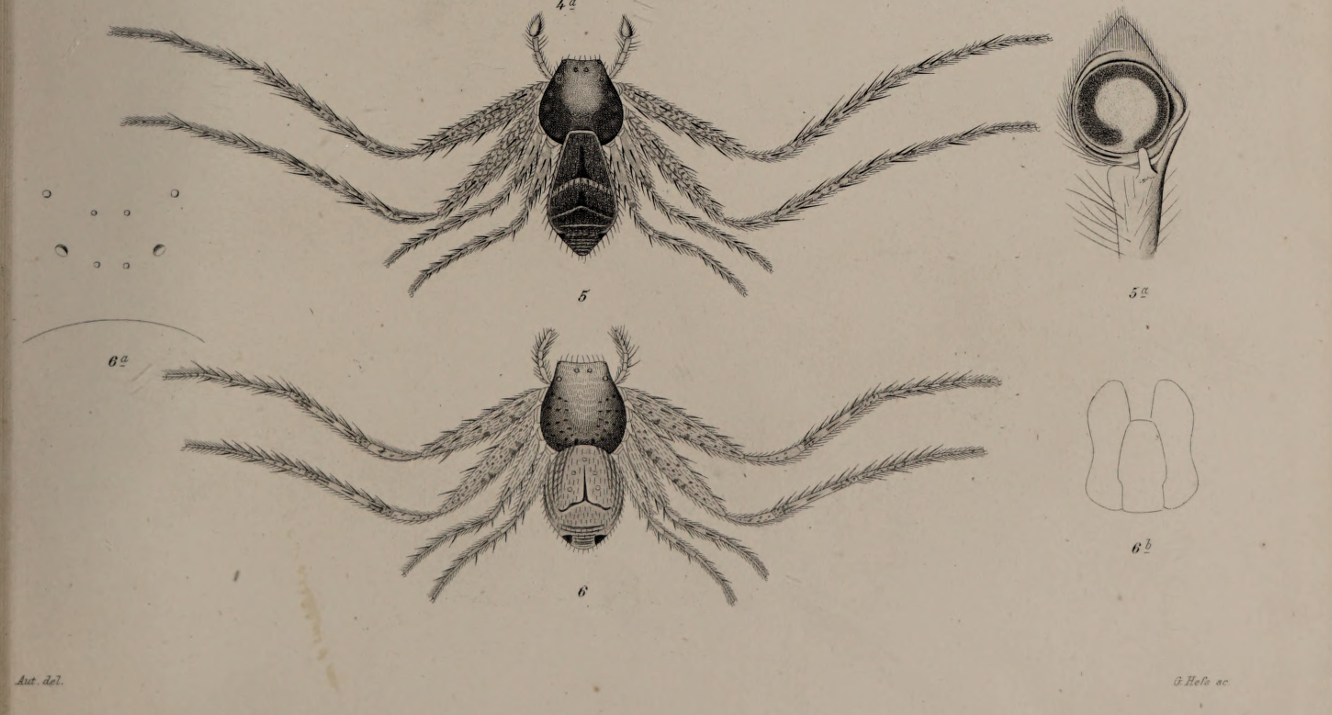
Drawing of male (fig. 5-5a) and female (fig. 6-6b) Tharrhalea albipes in L. Koch's 1875 work, Die Arachniden Australiens, nach der Natur beschrieben und abgebildet.

Tharrhalea albipes is a species of crab spider native to New Guinea and Northern Australia. No synonyms are listed.
