= Tharrhalea =

- T. evanida

Scientific classification
- Domain: Eukaryota
- Kingdom: Animalia
- Phylum: Arthropoda
- Subphylum: Chelicerata
- Class: Arachnida
- Order: Araneae
- Infraorder: Araneomorphae
- Family: Thomisidae
- Genus: Tharrhalea; Koch, 1875

Type species
- Tharrhalea albipes

Species
- 11, see text

Genus of spiders

Tharrhalea is a genus of crab spiders first described in 1875 by Ludwig Carl Christian Koch.

== Species ==
As of February 2019, it contains seventeen species:

- Tharrhalea albipes L. Koch, 1875 — New Guinea, Northern Australia
- Tharrhalea bicornis Simon, 1895 — Philippines
- Tharrhalea cerussata Simon, 1886 — Madagascar
- Tharrhalea evanida (L. Koch, 1867) — New Guinea, Northern Territory, Queensland, New South Wales
- Tharrhalea fusca (Thorell, 1877) — Sulawesi
- Tharrhalea irrorata (Thorell, 1881) — Queensland
- Tharrhalea luzonica (Karsch, 1880) — Philippines
- Tharrhalea maculata Kulczyński, 1911 — New Guinea
- Tharrhalea mariae Barrion & Litsinger, 1995 — Philippines
- Tharrhalea multopunctata (L. Koch, 1874) — New Guinea, Western Australia, South Australia, Queensland, New South Wales, Victoria
- Tharrhalea praetexta (L. Koch, 1865) — Samoa
- Tharrhalea prasina (L. Koch, 1876) — Queensland, New South Wales
- Tharrhalea pulleinei (Rainbow, 1915) — South Australia, New South Wales
- Tharrhalea semiargentea Simon, 1895 — Madagascar
- Tharrhalea superpicta Simon, 1886 — Madagascar
- Tharrhalea variabilis (L. Koch, 1875) — Queensland, New South Wales
- Tharrhalea variegata Kulczyński, 1911 — New Guinea
