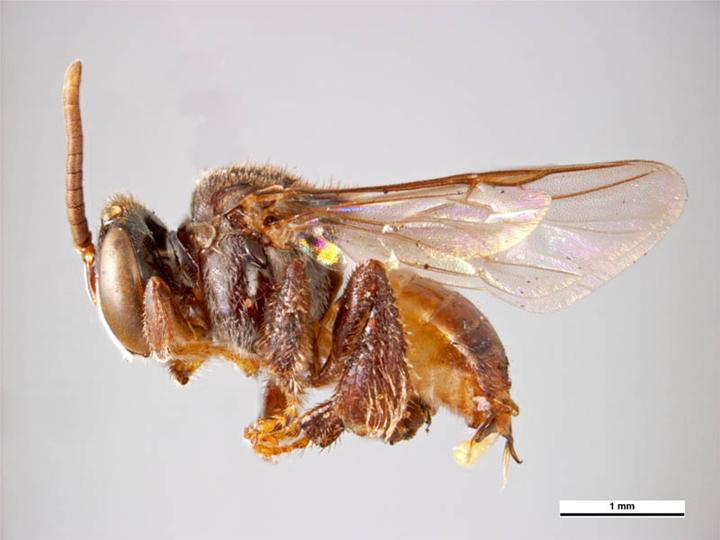
- Male

Scientific classification
- Kingdom: Animalia
- Phylum: Arthropoda
- Clade: Pancrustacea
- Class: Insecta
- Order: Hymenoptera
- Family: Apidae
- Genus: Tetragonula
- Species: T. clypearis

Binomial name
- Tetragonula clypearis (Friese, 1908)

Synonyms
- Trigona laeviceps clypearis Friese, 1908; Trigona wybenica Cockerell, 1929

= Tetragonula clypearis =

Species of bee

Tetragonula clypearis, also known as the clypeal stingless bee, is a species of stingless bee in the tribe Meliponini. It is native to Australasia and Southeast Asia. It was described in 1908 by German entomologist Heinrich Friese.

== Description ==
These are small bees. The body length of the workers is 3–4 mm, wing length 3–4 mm. They are mainly black to blackish-brown in colour.

== Distribution and habitat ==
Within Australia, the species occurs in tropical coastal north-eastern Queensland.

== Behaviour ==
The adults are flying mellivores. They are social insects that live in large colonies, with female reproductive and worker castes, building nests of wax and resin in dead timber and in house cavities.

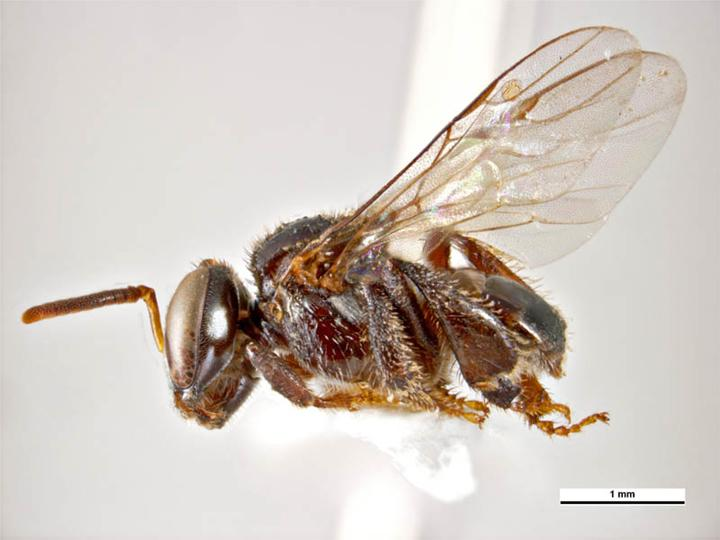
Female
