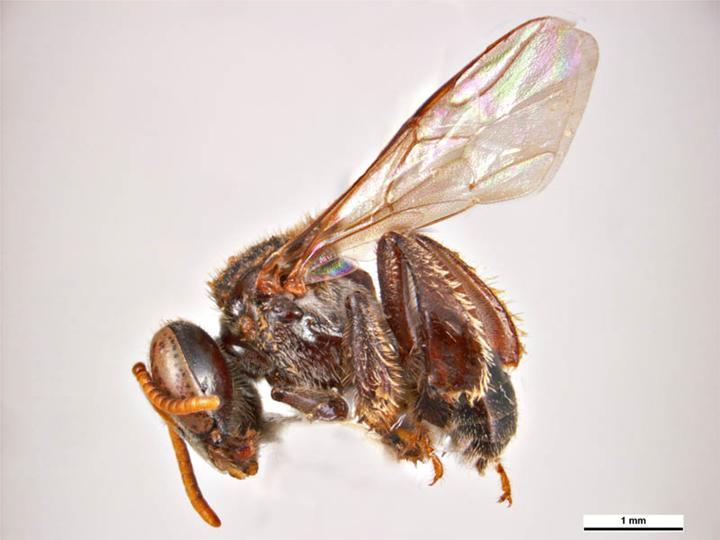
- Female

Scientific classification
- Kingdom: Animalia
- Phylum: Arthropoda
- Clade: Pancrustacea
- Class: Insecta
- Order: Hymenoptera
- Family: Apidae
- Genus: Tetragonula
- Species: T. sapiens

Binomial name
- Tetragonula sapiens (Cockerell, 1911)

Synonyms
- Trigona sapiens Cockerell, 1911

= Tetragonula sapiens =

Species of bee

Tetragonula sapiens is a species of stingless bee in the tribe Meliponini. It is native to Australasia and Southeast Asia. It was described in 1911 by British-American entomologist Theodore Dru Alison Cockerell.

== Description ==
These are small bees. The body length of the workers is 4 mm, wing length 3–4 mm. They are black to blackish-brown in colour.

== Distribution and habitat ==
The species’ range includes Australia, New Guinea, the Philippines and the Moluccas. Within Australia, it occurs in tropical coastal north-eastern Queensland, including the Cape York Peninsula.

== Behaviour ==
The adults are flying mellivores. They are social insects that live in large colonies, with female reproductive and worker castes. They build nests of wax and resin in tree trunks, within stone walls and natural rock crevices, and beneath concrete footpaths.

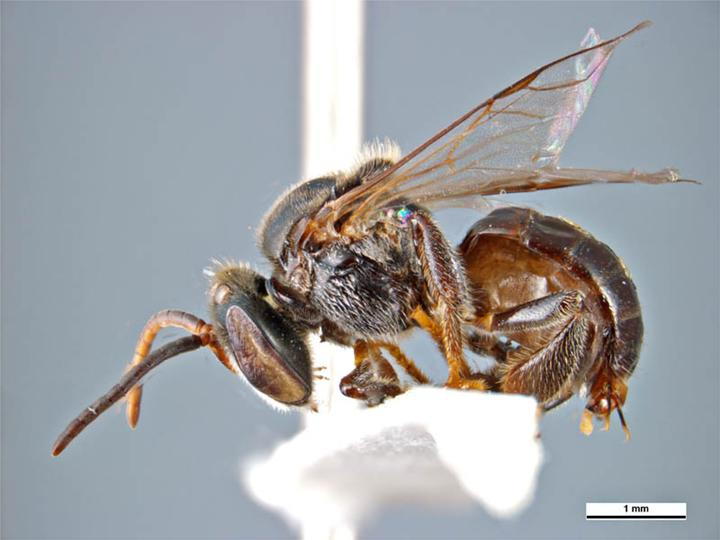
Male
