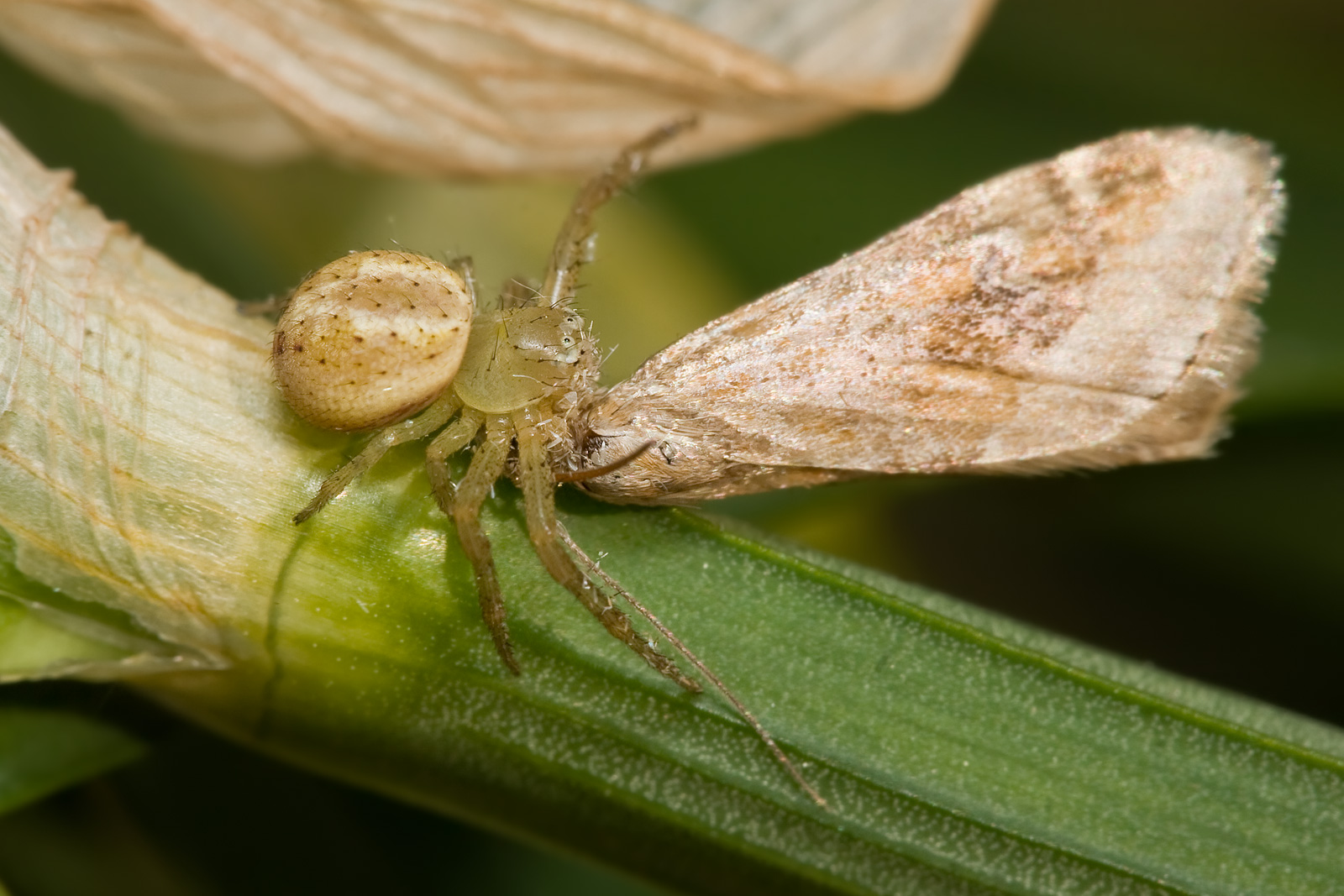
- Diaea evanida with prey on a jonquil flower

Scientific classification
- Domain: Eukaryota
- Kingdom: Animalia
- Phylum: Arthropoda
- Subphylum: Chelicerata
- Class: Arachnida
- Order: Araneae
- Infraorder: Araneomorphae
- Family: Thomisidae
- Genus: Tharrhalea
- Species: T. evanida

Binomial name
- Tharrhalea evanida (L. Koch, 1867)

Synonyms
- Xysticus evanidus L. Koch, 1867; Diaea evanida (L. Koch, 1874}; Diaea haematodactyla L. Koch, 1875; Diaea sticta Kulczyński, 1911d; Lehtinelagia evanida (L. Koch, 1874)

= Tharrhalea evanida =

Species of flowering plant

Tharrhalea evanida, synonym Diaea evanida, also called the pink flower spider, is a species of spider in the family Thomisidae. It is found in Australia (the Northern Territory, Queensland and New South Wales) and in New Guinea.

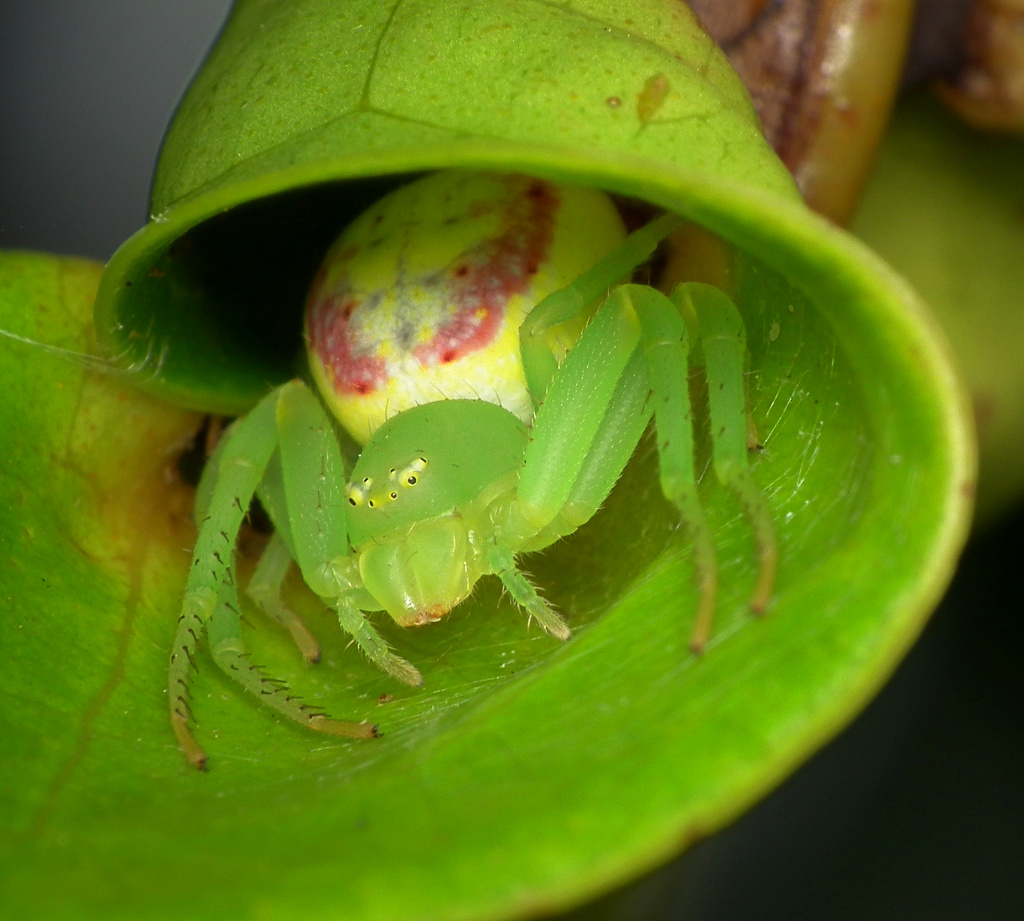
Hiding in the leaves of a lemon myrtle at Acacia Ridge, Brisbane
