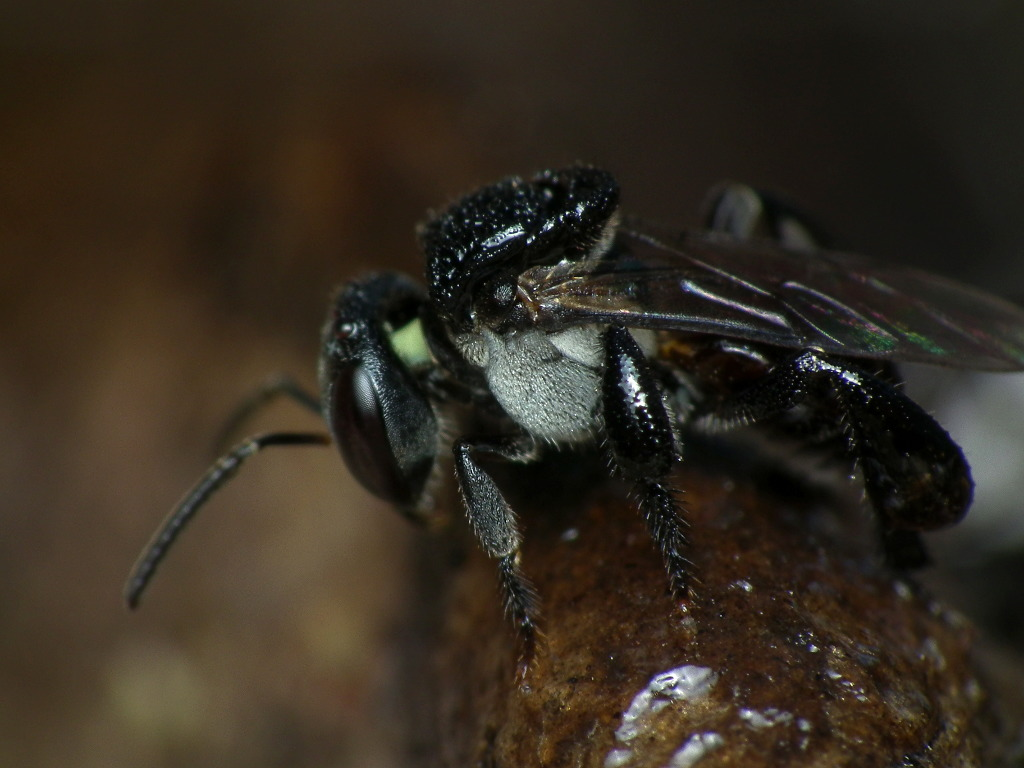

Scientific classification
- Kingdom: Animalia
- Phylum: Arthropoda
- Clade: Pancrustacea
- Class: Insecta
- Order: Hymenoptera
- Family: Apidae
- Clade: Corbiculata
- Tribe: Meliponini
- Genus: Tetragonula
- Species: T. carbonaria

Binomial name
- Tetragonula carbonaria Smith, 1854

Synonyms
- Trigona angophorae Cockerell, T.D.A. 1912

= Tetragonula carbonaria =

Species of bee

Tetragonula carbonaria (previously known as Trigona carbonaria) is a stingless bee, endemic to the north-east coast of Australia. Its common name is sugarbag bee. They are also occasionally referred to as bush bees. The bee is known to pollinate orchid species, such as Dendrobium lichenastrum, D. toressae, and D. speciosum. It has been identified as an insect that collects pollen from the cycad Cycas media. They are also known for their small body size, reduced wing venation, and highly developed social structure comparable to honey bees.

Tetragonula carbonaria produce edible honey, which they store in pots in the nest made from propolis. These pots are referred to as sugarbags, giving the bees their common name of sugarbag bees. These pots and the whole nest are eaten by some Indigenous Australian communities as bush tucker. The bees themselves are also important cultural symbols for many Indigenous Australians.

== Stingless bees ==
Twenty-one genera of stingless bees (family Apidae) are described worldwide. As the name would suggest, the stings of these bees are vestigial and useless in defence. About 14 species are found in Australia, mostly in the tropical north. T. carbonaria is one of the few exceptions, being found as far south as Bega in southern New South Wales. Stingless bees and honey bees are thought to have evolved from a common ancestor, like bumblebees, which would explain their similarities in social behaviour. Some of these similarities are co-operative brood care, and having different castes of queens, workers, and drones. The workers are infertile females, while the drones are males.

== Taxonomy and phylogeny ==
The eusocial stingless bees (Apidae, Apinae, Meliponini) comprise about 374 species. Two genera occur in Australia, with Tetragonula being one of them. The Tetragonula species of Australia were once in the larger genus Trigona, but were moved into a new genus in 2013. Only minor structural differences are seen at the species level of the genus Tetragonula. T. carbonaria is nearly identical to T. hockingsi, besides a few differences in their nest architecture.

== Description ==
=== Bees ===
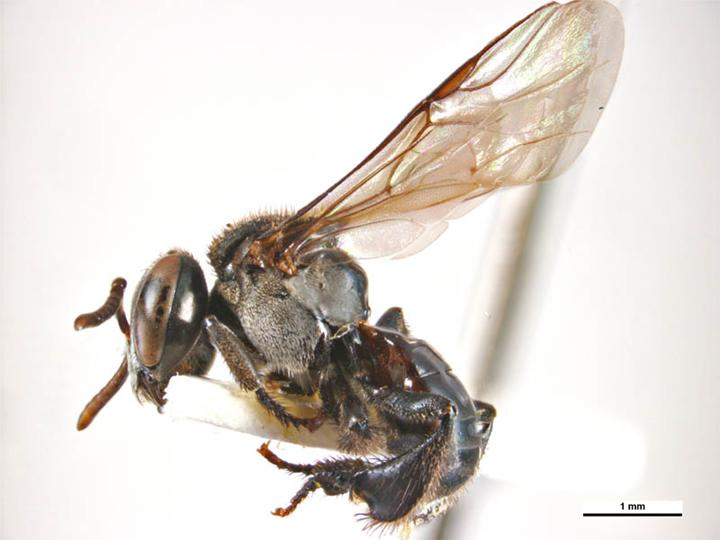
T. carbonaria

Compared to other stingless bees, T. carbonaria tends to be medium-sized. However, their size can vary based on location. For instance, T. carbonaria from Queensland can be as small as T. mellipes, but in New South Wales, they can get as large as T. hockingsi. They are all predominantly black-bodied, covered in microscopic hairs. The adult workers and males are all black, with some brownish tint in certain areas such as the legs. The worker’s body length is 3.9–4.3 mm (0.15–0.17 in) and the wing length (including tegula) is 4.1–4.6 mm (0.16–0.18 in). The male drones have very similar bodies and wing lengths, but can be identified by different antennae. T. carbonaria is a very strong flier, being able to fly up to 1 km (0.62 mi). Female bees generally only forage within 500 m (1,600 ft) of their colony, while male bees can fly much farther, some dispersing as far as 20 km (12 mi) from their original colony. T. carbonaria and its closely related species have high levels of morphological similarities. Also, very low genetic variation exists within T. carbonaria. T. carbonaria can be distinguished from other species of Australian Native Stingless Bees by their brood (in a distinctive spiral unique to the species), and by the entrance (these bees tend to daub resins around their entrances, where as other species, such as T. hockingsi generally keep their entrances clean).

=== Nest structure ===
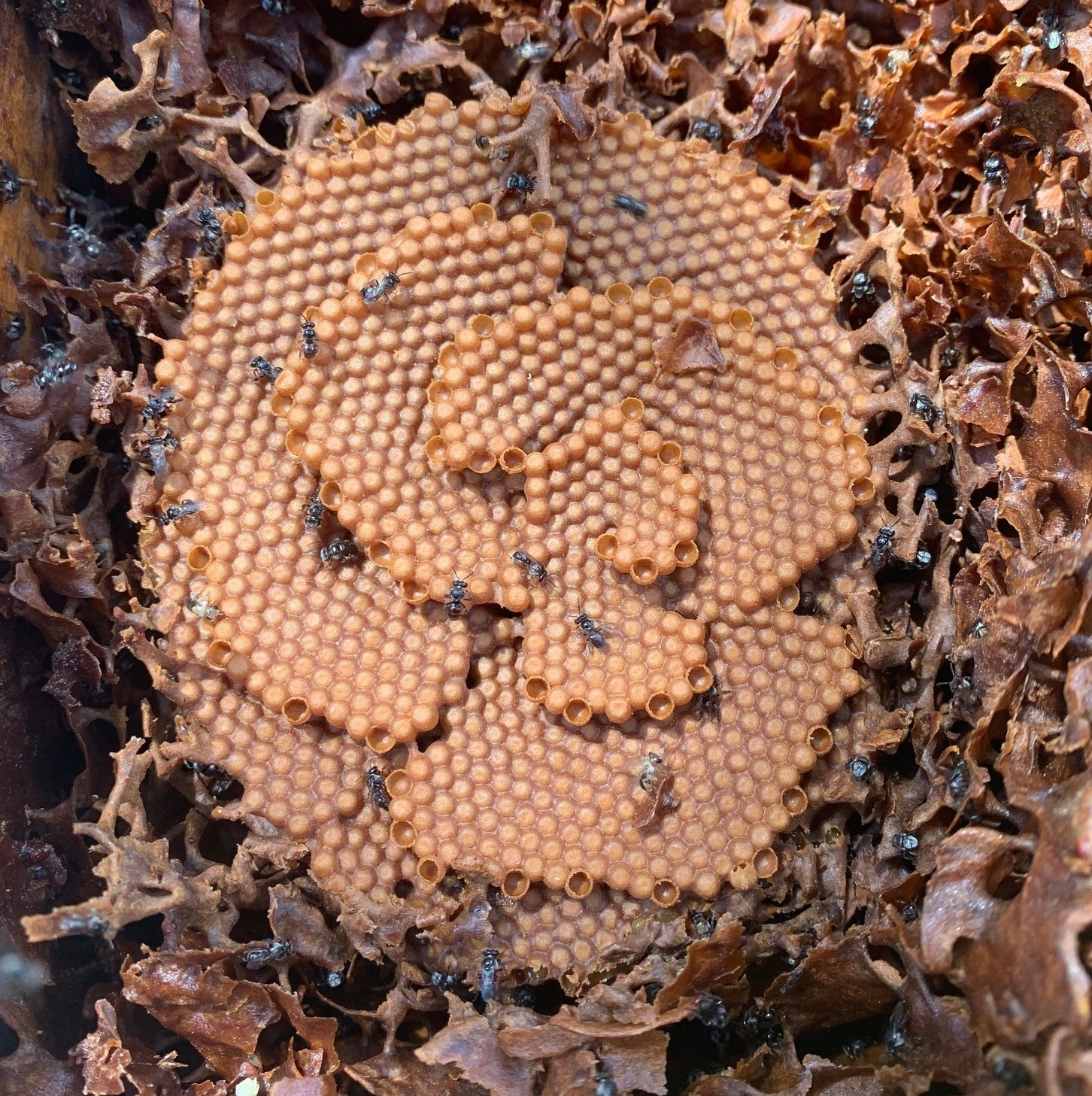
Tetragonula Carbonaria Brood Structure

The entrance and surrounding areas of their nest are coated with a smooth, thick layer of black, red, or yellow cerumen or propolis, a material formed by mixing beeswax (a glandular secretion of worker bees) with resin (collected from plants). They lack external entrance tunnels, but do build internal entrance tunnels where guard bees patrol, looking out for any intruders (including Small Hive Beetle, Phorid Fly, and other bees). T. carbonaria builds brood cells arranged in combs or semicombs. The cells are a single layer of hexagonal combs that are built in a distinctive spiral. They are vertically elongated and in a regular vertical orientation. They are built out of brown cerumen, and house the eggs and larvae. New cells are added to the brood by the advancing front. The nest cavity may be sealed off from adjoining cavities by a hard bitumen layer of cerumen or field-collected material. The brood chamber is centred in the hive, which makes T. carbonaria suitable for hive propagation. The brood chamber is also made up of multiple horizontal layers which allow for easy division of the brood comb.

== Distribution and habitat ==
The nests are found in open forests and woodlands. They are usually built in tree cavities, and have small cryptic entrances, with no external entrance tube. Four or five workers are usually visible at the entrance and are expected to be guards. They tend to choose larger trees and wider cavities to produce insulation valuable for their survival in the cool regions. Some features that would favour survival in a cooler climate are a high tree height and large feeding pots. The nesting sites of T. carbonaria are located near the top tree trunks that are 1.5 m (4 ft 11 in) in diameter, and are predominantly found in trees that are well insulated. Members of T. carbonaria also create the largest honey and pollen pots compared to the other species of the genus Tetragonula, which may help with efficient food storage. In urban and suburban areas, T. carbonaria have been found to nest in telecommunications pits as well as water meters when other habitat is not available.

== Colony cycle ==
=== Activity ===
Colonies of T. carbonaria tend to be active all year round. The daily activity period, however, is longer in the southern hemisphere's warmer months, October to March. The intensity of these daily flights is greatest in September, and least intense in May. A temperature threshold exists on all of this activity. Flight can only occur at temperatures greater than 18 °C (64 °F). This year-long period of activity is beneficial for the pollination of crops flowering at any time of the year.

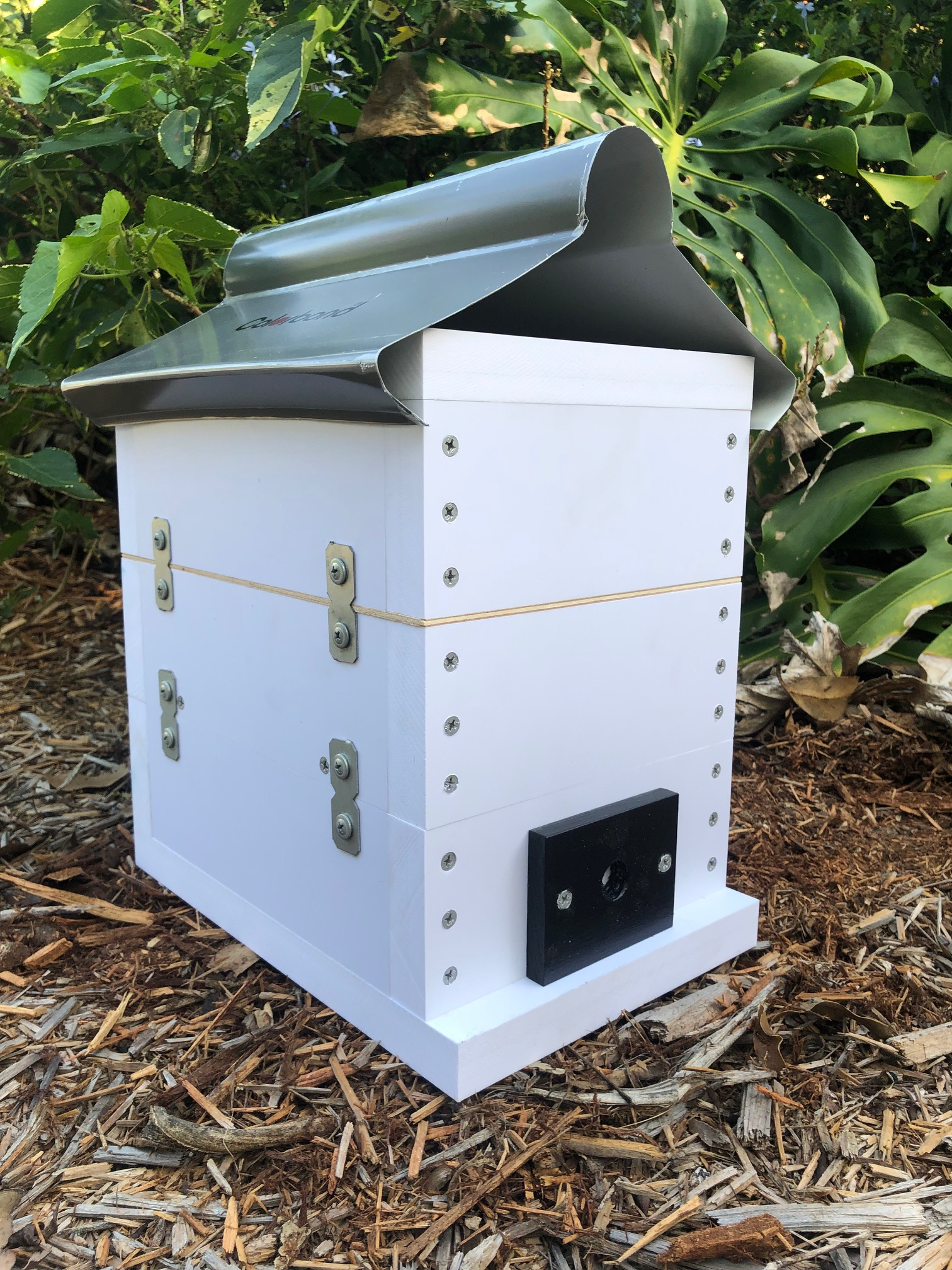
OATH Bee Hive

=== Initiation ===
Each brood cell is stocked almost to the brim with honey and pollen. An egg is laid in the cell by the queen and then the cell is closed. Complete larval and pupal development occurs in the closed cell . Once the adult emerges, the cell is destroyed. Most stingless bee species are monogynous, meaning that when the colony divides, one of the daughter colonies will be queenless. T. carbonaria colonies are frequently divided by beekeepers to increase the number of colonies. They build emergency queen cells by fusing two worker-sized cells that contain eggs or young larvae.

The queens cannot live alone and they are not transferred to a new nest until it has been fully prepared by workers. The new queen is the bee that makes the flight to the new nest, with the old queen remaining in the parent nest. When the old queen has died, mating swarms can occur at the established nest to replace the old queen with a young, unmated one.

=== Growth ===
A study performed by Tim Heard in 1988 observed the propagation of hives in T. carbonaria. He successfully transferred colonies to boxes, and then once the available space was occupied, he would split the box by prying apart the two halves of the box. He recorded that colony weight increased much more in spring and summer compared to autumn and winter. After about 17 months, the final weight was established. The rate at which colony weight increases is dependent on the availability of nectar and pollen, not age (however, it usually takes 12 to 18 months for a hive to be ready to be propagated). A heavy hive suggests filled storage pots and a large population of workers and brood, meaning the hive is ready to be split.

== Behaviour ==
=== Division of labour ===
Division of labour exists among the workers. There is a progression from safer to riskier jobs as the bees mature. The young bees perform tasks within the nests, such as cleaning and brood care. As they mature, they move on to jobs involving building nest structures, like pollen and honey pots, while the oldest bees become foragers and their tasks are performed outside of the nest.

=== Foraging behaviour ===
T. carbonaria depends on nectar and pollen for survival. They also collect resin for use in the nest structure. Workers tend to exhibit characteristics of group-foraging behaviour called "opportunism". In short, opportunism is when many foragers search for resources independently, and once they find a highly resourceful flower, they rapidly recruit nest mates. In other words, they are optimising the feeding intake of the colony. The success in this practice is dependent on chance. If a forager encounters an area full of rich resources, then recruitment and harvesting are extremely heavy in this area until the resources are depleted. Workers look for areas with the highest sugar concentration in the nectar, as they have the ability to physiologically identify the richest sugar solutions. As more nest mates arrive to the area with rich resources, the availability of this high-concentration sugar decreases to a point where moving onto another area that might be lower in concentration is best. In T. carbonaria colonies, only some of the bees do the foraging. Workers spread out in all directions surrounding the colony, and quickly locate the best option nearest the nest. Once this area is found, they mark the food sources with a pheromone. Marking is used as a guide to make the location easier to find for their nest mates.

=== Reproduction ===
T. carbonaria queens mate a single time. When the time comes for a virgin queen (sometimes referred to as a "princess") to mate, a "male swarm" (also referred to as a "drone swarm" or "mating swarm") will form. This entails hundreds to thousands of male stingless bees aggregating around the entrance to the hive of the virgin queen, usually for multiple days and sometimes multiple weeks. The virgin queen will then leave the hive to mate with a single male. When mating, the male will insert a mating plug into the virgin queens genitalia, after which the male will die. The newly mated queen will then return to the hive and begin laying eggs.

Queens are the only caste in a T. carbonaria colony that can produce eggs. In many stingless bee species, workers can produce unfertilized eggs that develop into haploid males, therefore having both the queen and the workers with potential to be the mother of the males in the colony. Microsatellite analysis has shown that T. carbonaria workers do not contribute to the production of males. Workers have also been shown to be irreversibly sterile, having ovaries that are reduced in size compared to virgin queens with no developing oocytes.

== Kin selection ==
=== Genetic relatedness within colonies ===
The workers tend to be the progeny of a singly mated queen. The drones are predominantly haploid males which arose from queen-laid eggs. Mating frequency is a central factor in kin selection arguments. Some cases are seen of diploid males, which are generally sterile and are considered to have a very low fitness. Diploid males tend to have a cost to the colony because diploidy can result in a reduced proportion of workers able to perform their tasks, which is pivotal to the colony’s survival. In some extreme cases, workers have been reported to kill a queen producing diploid males, to help the future success of the colony.

=== Worker-queen conflict ===
Very little queen-worker agonism occurs during oviposition in T. carbonaria. In many stingless bee species, when workers do lay eggs, direct conflict tends to occur within the colony between the queen and the workers over the source of male egg during the cell provisioning and the oviposition process. Notably, T. carbonaria workers do not lay eggs, so it is unlikely this system occurs for this species, and has yet to be observed.

== Interaction with other species ==
=== Defence ===
When the colonies are attacked, nest defence relies on the ability to recognise intruders. T. carbonaria sometimes displays a behaviour known as a "fighting swarm" when a non-nest mate is encountered. Thousands of workers gather together and form a cloud. The signal to form this cloud is most likely mediated by alarm pheromones, which workers release from their mandibular glands. As one entity, they drop to the ground and wrestle the intruders, which often leads to death of both parties. This behaviour is also a common defence mechanism against large predators such as humans. T. carbonaria bees are highly sensitive to intruders, since they will even attack invaders that are carrying pollen or nectar. Even if an intruder found a way to make it past the swarm, it still would not make it through the congested entrance tunnel.

=== Predators ===
One predator known to attack T. carbonaria is an Australian crab spider, Diaea evanida. This organism is able to exploit the interaction between plants and their pollinators, something investigated by one scientific study. These crab spiders attract and ambush pollinators on flowers. They produce UV-reflective body colours that attract prey to the flowers they are occupying. However, Australian native bees are able to detect and avoid flowers harbouring crab spiders despite the fact that they are initially attracted to them. Diaea evanida spiders can generate colour contrasts for bees’ individual preferences, but T. carbonaria did not show any preference for any of the contrasts.

Tetragonula carbonaria is also known to be targeted by many species of Australian Bembix wasps, a type of sand wasp. In particular, Bembix musca has been known to hunt at T. carbonaria entrances in Queensland and New South Wales. These wasps will collect bees as they fly in and out of the colony and take them to nests built in the sand to feed their young. Assassin bugs are another common predator that ambush stingless bees at the entrances to their hive.

=== Parasites ===
The braconid wasp Syntretus trigonaphagus is currently the only known parasitoid wasp that targets T. carbonaria. The braconid subfamily Euphorinae has several genera, including Syntretus, known to be parasitoids of the adult stage of insects. Females of S. trigonaphagus are frequently found at the entrances of T. carbonaria hives in Queensland, Australia. They approach workers that land nearby and oviposit on the host by curling their abdomens. The workers repeatedly brush their abdomens afterwards, suggesting that they were aware that an attack occurred. The overall effect of this parasitism is usually fatal. Foragers, the oldest of the workers, are more likely to be parasitised. Because of this, as long as the number of parasites is minimal, the overall cost to the colony is likely not large, since these workers have already contributed substantially to the colony’s welfare.

The hives of T. carbonaria are also often host to many parasites. The hive Syrphid fly Ceriana ornata and hive Phorid fly Dorniphora trigonae are two Australian flies that target stingless bee hives for reproduction. The small hive beetle Aethina tumida is an invasive beetle that primarily targets honey bee colonies, but now also affects stingless bees since its introduction to Australia. These nest parasites will lay eggs within the hive itself, the emerging larvae then eating the pollen and honey stores of the hive. Hive beetles and Phorid flies enter the colony through the nest entrance, while Syrphid flies attempt to penetrate the propolis of a colony to lay its eggs. The bees have been observed "mummifying" small hive beetles that enter the nest by coating and immobilising the invaders in wax, resin, and mud or soil from the nest.

== Importance to humans ==
=== Beekeeping ===
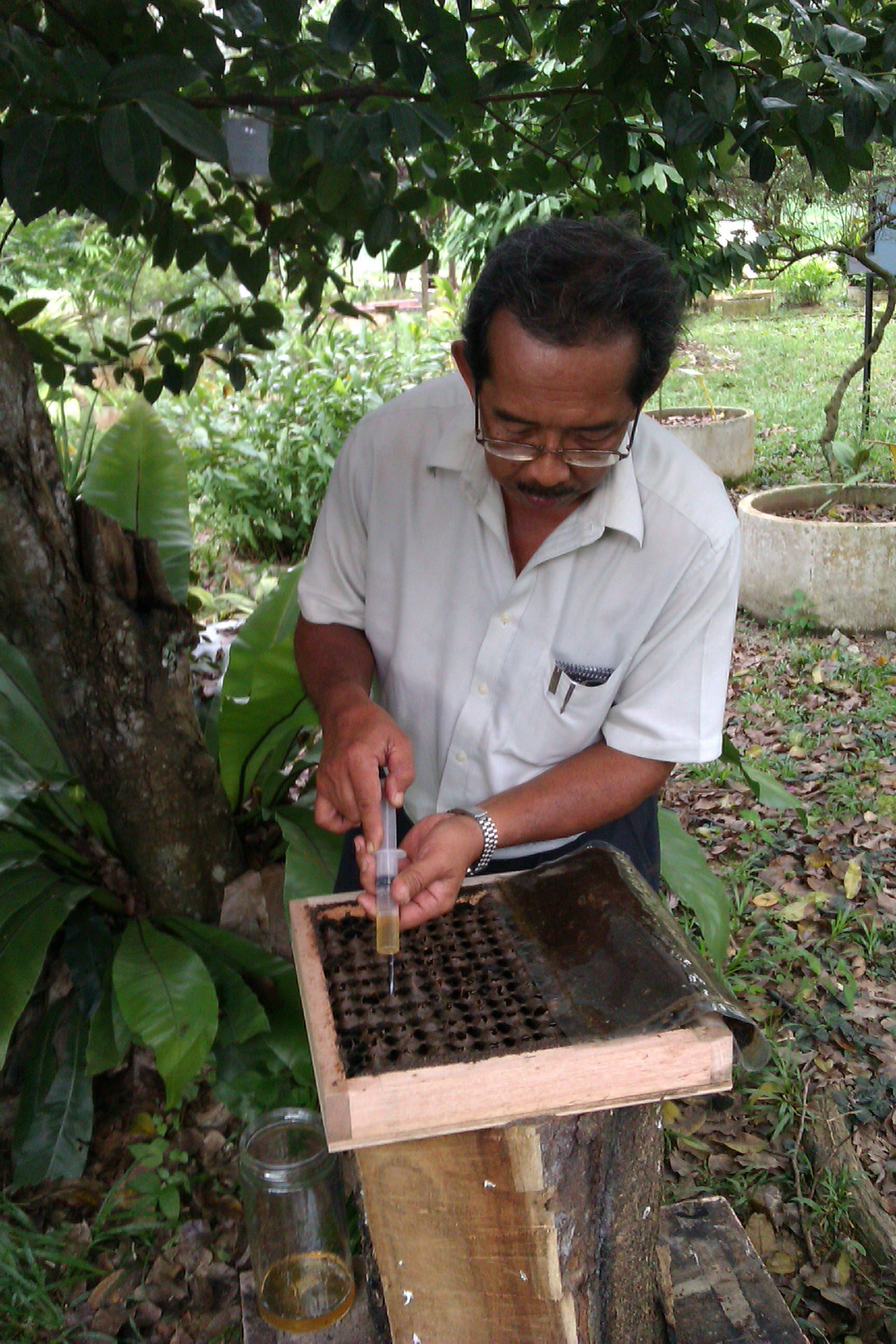
Meliponiculture in Malaysia

Meliponiculture is the practice of stingless beekeeping, where beekeepers maintain, reproduce, and use stingless bee colonies for their own profit. These colonies tend to be managed through artificial hives, so that the beekeepers have the ability to propagate the colonies and produce hive products such as honey and pollen. Most Australian beekeepers utilise the Original Australian Trigona Hive (OATH) box design, invented by Tim Heard, to standardise the production and use of man-made hives. OATH boxes consist of two to three boxes that are 20 cm × 28 cm (7.9 in × 11.0 in) externally and 15 cm × 23 cm (5.9 in × 9.1 in) internally. These boxes are stacked on top of one another with one or more entrance tubes to allow the bees to come and go. Often, the bottom two boxes will be connected to allow the bees to build brood and honey stores within them, and if used, the top box is slightly partitioned from the bottom two to prevent brood construction and is then used as a honey super. While this system is widely used, the exact implementation of the OATH can differ between beekeepers, and many other artificial hive designs are used as well.

When the first work began in 1984 on this stingless bee, the industry was practically nonexistent. Since then, the interest in stingless bees, more specifically T. carbonaria, has greatly increased. This has allowed for the establishment of conservation groups along the eastern regions of Australia. T. carbonaria is the most popular species that beekeepers tend, followed by the A. australis and then T. hockingsi. Stingless bee hive products can be sold from a range of businesses, from health-food stores to gift shops. The honey of T. carbonaria possesses a unique smell which makes it an appealing product to many. With this, the amount of honey produced is constantly increasing at a fast pace. Despite this, the main reason for most people to keep T. carbonaria is for enjoyment and conservation. T. carbonaria is the main species from which beekeepers harvest honey of the stingless bees in Australia, however, many struggle to produce large quantities of honey from their personal hives. Beekeepers report that one of the major limiting factors in propagating colonies is the availability of queens. More research is needed on queen rearing to address this limiting factor.

=== Agriculture (as pollinators) ===
Individual T. carbonaria bees demonstrate a consistency in floral choice. Individuals restrict their foraging activity to one kind of flower during a particular trip. This consistency in a single pollen type enhances the pollinator efficacy by increasing the chances of pollen being transferred to stigmata of the same plant species. This increases their importance ecologically as crop pollinators. At the level of the colony, however, the species can use many different flowering species. So although the species is polylectic, individual bees remain consistent with their flower choice.

=== Honey ===
Meliponines store their honey in pots, not in combs like the honey bees. As a result of this storage method, the honey of stingless bees is slightly fermented, giving it a distinctly tangy taste and strong sweet smell. Compared to the honey of the Western honey bee A. mellifera, T. carbonaria honey had higher values in moisture, water activity, and electrical activity. The two different honeys can also be distinguished by flavour and aroma. Due to its higher water content, T. carbonaria honey is not as shelf-stable as traditional honeybee honey, and will ferment easily if not stored correctly. To extract honey from a T. carbonaria hive, beekeepers will open the hive box and manually pierce the honeypots before flipping the box upside down to allow the honey to pour into a container. This can be a fairly destructive process, and must be performed carefully to prevent damaging the brood cells or the overall hive structure more than the bees can repair.

T. carbonaria honey and propolis have been shown to have strong antimicrobial properties. For honey, this likely results from hydrogen peroxide activity, but also from high levels of non-peroxide activity that can be retained in samples stored for multiple years, bee-secretions, and selective foraging. As well as this, the antioxidant activity of T. carbonaria honey has been shown to have nutritional and pharmaceutical potential, making T. carbonaria honey a promising avenue for medical research.
