= Jesus Santiago Moure =

Brazilian entomologist

- Born: 2 November 1912; Ribeirão Preto
- Died: 10 July 2010 (aged 97); Batatais
- Occupation: Regular priest (1937–)
- Awards: National Order of Scientific Merit (1995); Great Cross of the National Order of Scientific Merit (1998)

Jesus Santiago Moure (born 2 November 1912 in Ribeirão Preto, died on 10 July 2010 in Batatais) was a Brazilian entomologist who specialised in Hymenoptera.
