= Green dock beetle =

Green dock beetle is a common name for several insects and may refer to:

- Gastrophysa cyanea, native to North America
- Gastrophysa viridula, native to Europe
