= Gastrophysa dissimilis =

Scientific classification
- Domain: Eukaryota
- Kingdom: Animalia
- Phylum: Arthropoda
- Class: Insecta
- Order: Coleoptera
- Suborder: Polyphaga
- Infraorder: Cucujiformia
- Family: Chrysomelidae
- Genus: Gastrophysa
- Species: G. dissimilis

Binomial name
- Gastrophysa dissimilis (Say, 1824)

Species of beetle

Gastrophysa dissimilis is a species of leaf beetle in the family Chrysomelidae. It is found in North America.
