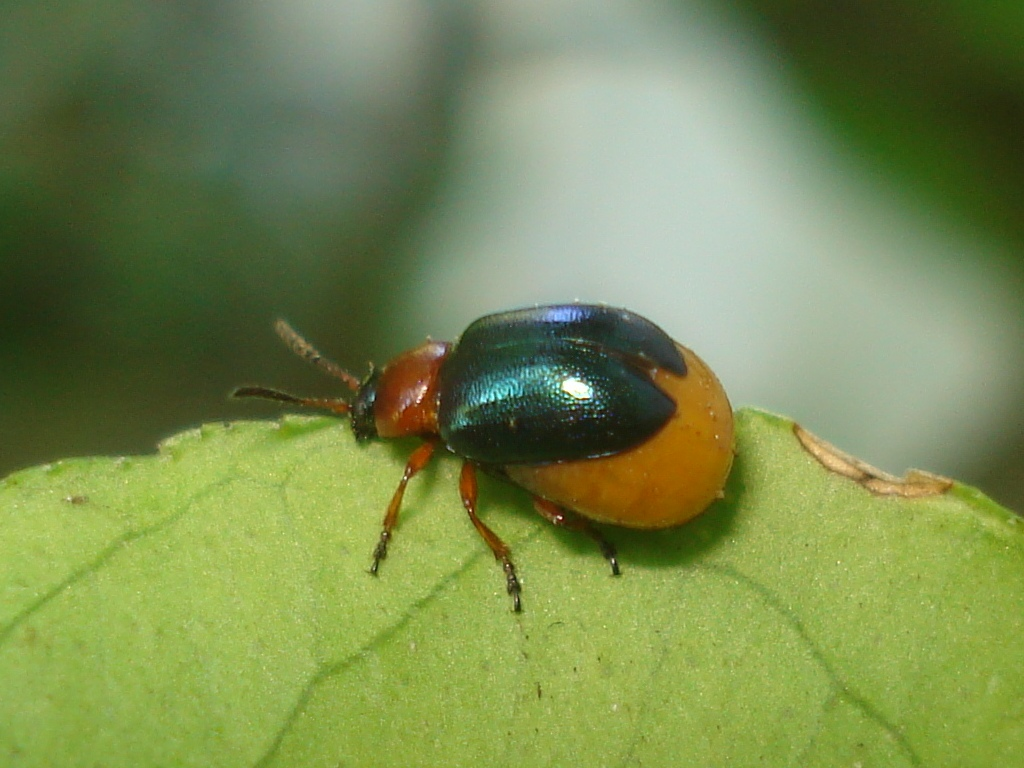
- Female Gastrophysa polygoni

Scientific classification
- Kingdom: Animalia
- Phylum: Arthropoda
- Class: Insecta
- Order: Coleoptera
- Suborder: Polyphaga
- Infraorder: Cucujiformia
- Family: Chrysomelidae
- Genus: Gastrophysa
- Species: G. polygoni

Binomial name
- Gastrophysa polygoni (Linnaeus, 1758)

= Gastrophysa polygoni =

Species of beetle

Gastrophysa polygoni is a species of leaf beetle in the subfamily Chrysomelinae. It was described by Carl Linnaeus in 1758. The species can be up to 5mm long and is green-blue in colour. The thorax is orange and the wing cases are a metallic green, and the beetle can be seen in spring and summer.
