= Neosomy =

Mode of invertebrate growth

Neosomy is the formation of new external structure in an active stage of an invertebrate, in a taxon that normally only changes during moulting. It occurs in nematodes and a wide range of arthropods, especially those with symbiotic lifestyles.

An organism that has undergone neosomy is a neosome, while a new external structure formed by neosomy is a neosomule.

Neosomy is similar to physogastrism (or physogastry) and the two phenomena are sometimes confused. However, physogastrism is usually defined as distension of the abdomen, without the growth of new cuticle.

== Examples ==
=== Acari ===
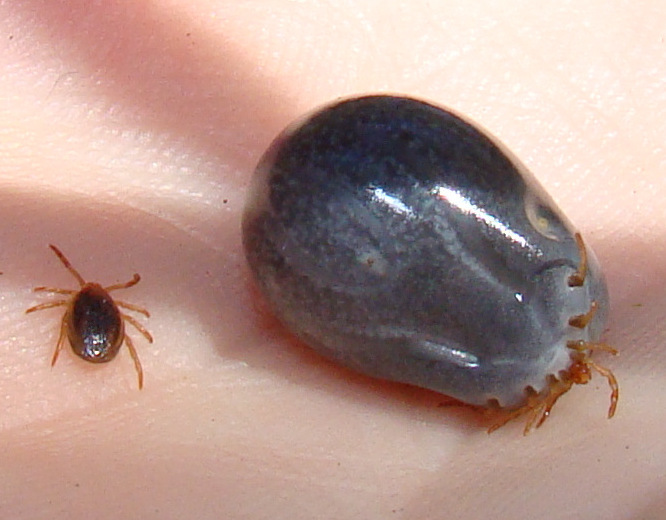
An unfed and a fed ixodid tick

Larvae of some chiggers can increase in size massively via neosomy, such as Vatacarus (from sea kraits) enlarging by 1500 times or more, and Riedlinia (from bats) by up to 750 times.

Other mites with neosomatic larvae include Trombidium, Eutrombidium and the aquatic Eylais and Hydrachna.

In mites of family Hypoderatidae, deutonymphs grow by neosomy. Deutonymph are the main (sometimes only) feeding stage in the hypoderatid life cycle.

In ticks of family Ixodidae, the larvae, nymphs and adult females show neosomy. This involves an initial period where the tick thickens its cuticle and slowly gains weight, then a rapid engorgement (increasing the tick's size by as much as 100 times) that returns the cuticle to its original thickness. In the soft ticks (Argasidae), neosomy usually occurs in larvae only.

=== Insects ===
Females of some flea species in superfamilies Pulicoidea, Vermipsylloidea and Malacopsylloidea are neosomatic. For example, an adult female Tunga monositus starts out at 1 mm long and, after feeding and growing, increases in volume by 1000 times, becomes circular in shape and forms anterior lobes that the head is retracted between (for protection).

Similar to the aforementioned fleas, bat flies of genus Ascodipteron have females which attach to a host, then lose their limbs and transform into neosomes, with the head and thorax withdrawn into a swollen abdomen.

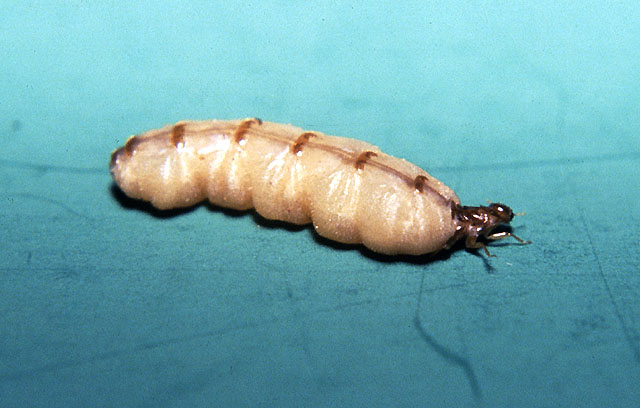
Neosomatic termite queen

Neosomy occurs in queen termites and in queen ants of certain species. Queen termites include the largest neosomes among terrestrial arthropods, with some exceeding 12.5 cm in length.

Termite-associated species of phorid flies and rove beetles have neosomatic females. In rove beetles, some genera have neosomatic males as well as females, and neosomy in some genera results in an abdomen that resembles a termite.

=== Crustaceans ===
Parasitic copepods, such as Lernaea, Collipravus, and Lernaeenicus, exhibit neosomy. In some of the more extreme instances, neosomes vary greatly in shape within a species.

== Purposes ==
Neosomy is a mechanism that allows a symbiote to better exploit abundant food. It increases the reproductive potential of females. For example, a female ixodid tick can usually lay thousands of eggs at once, compared to the few hundred eggs of a female non-neosomatic argasid.

There are also other possible purposes. In Termitomimus and Nasutimimus rove beetles, the abdomen is similar in shape to a termite nymph and may be used in tactile mimicry.
