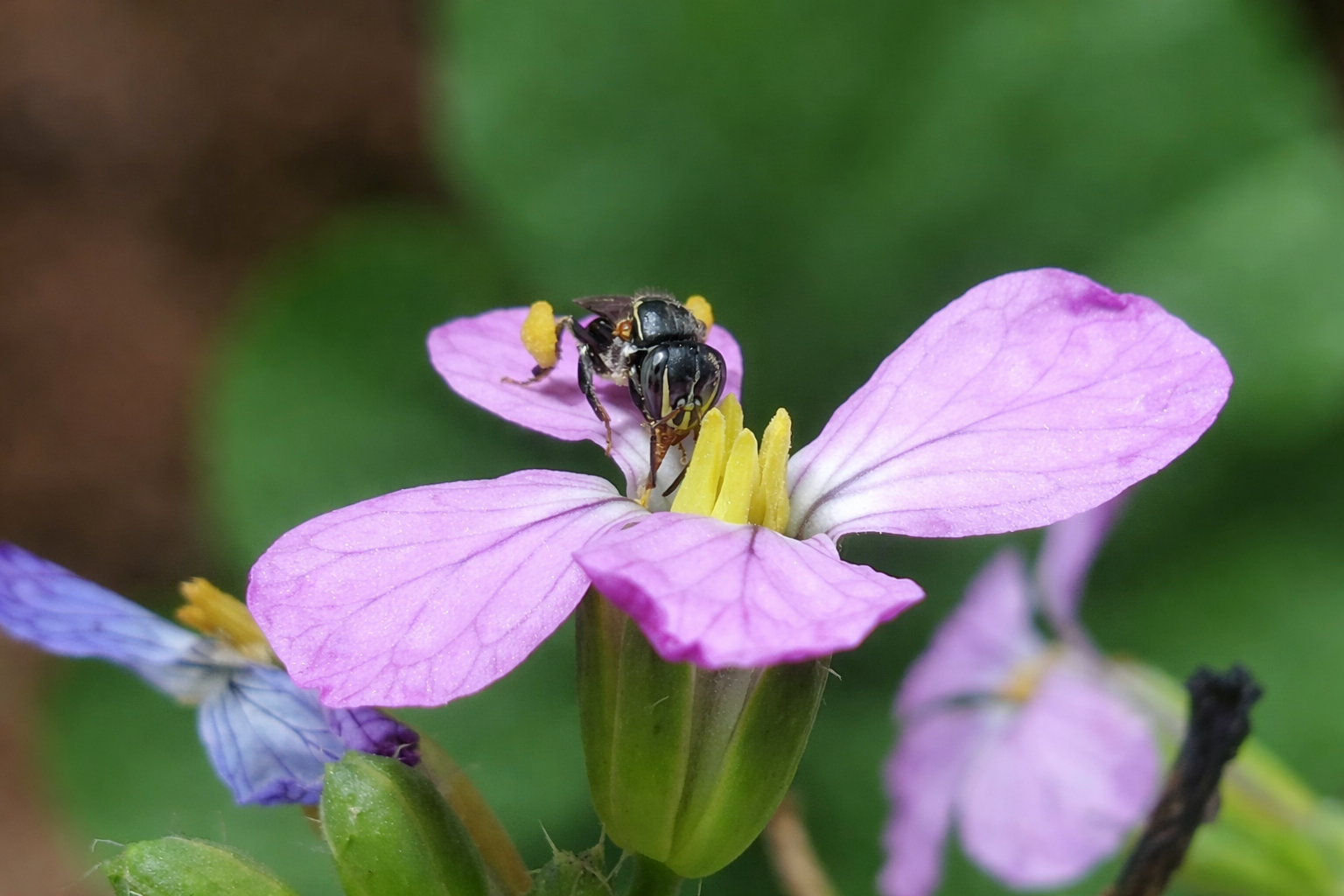

Scientific classification
- Kingdom: Animalia
- Phylum: Arthropoda
- Class: Insecta
- Order: Hymenoptera
- Family: Apidae
- Tribe: Meliponini
- Genus: Paratrigona; Schwarz, 1938

= Paratrigona =

Genus of bees

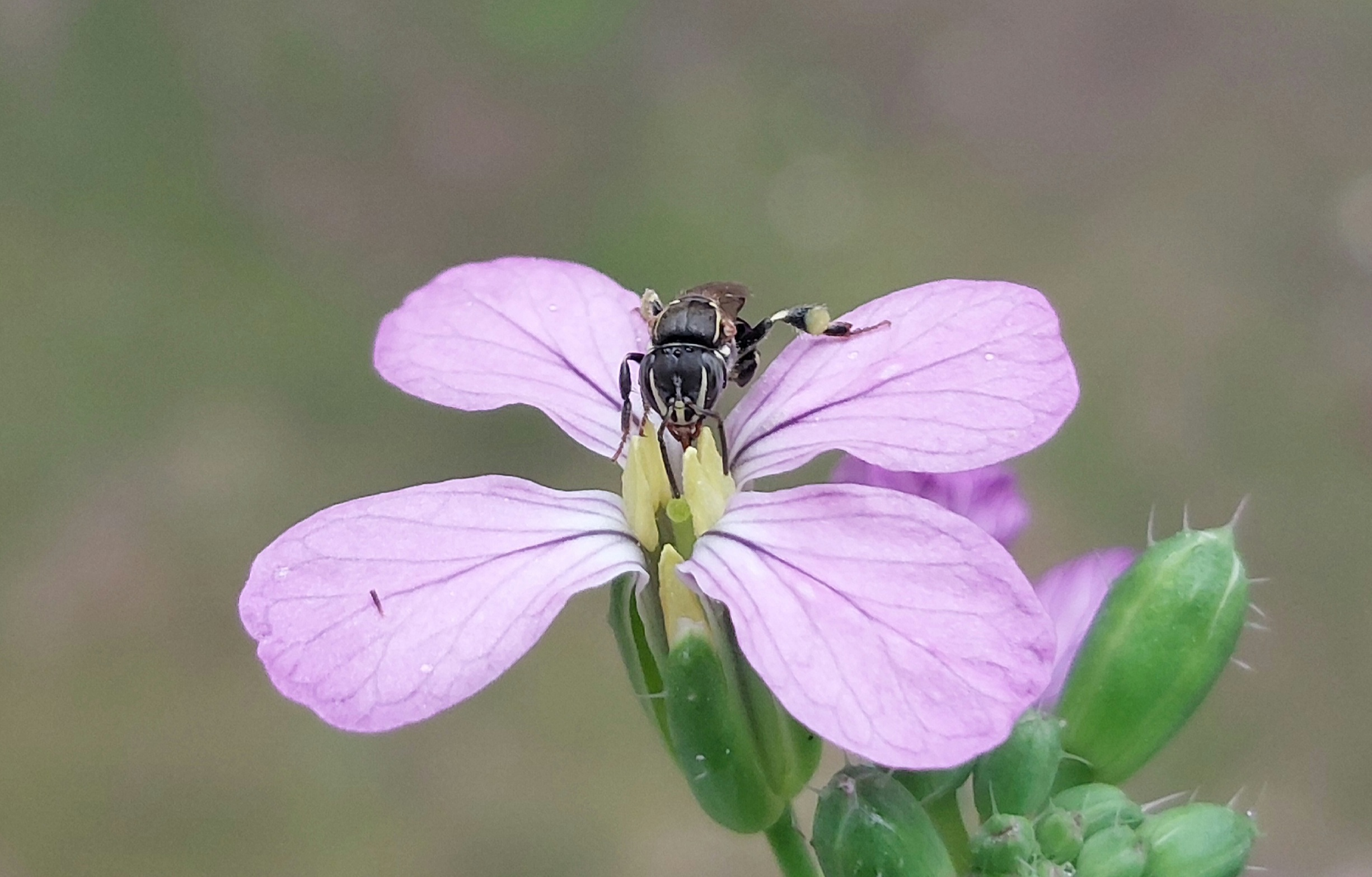
Paratrigona Lineata (example).

Paratrigona is a genus of bees belonging to the family Apidae.

The species of this genus are found in South America.

Species:

- Paratrigona anduzei (Schwarz, 1943)
- Paratrigona catabolonota Camargo & Moure, 1994
- Paratrigona compsa Camargo & Moure, 1994
- Paratrigona crassicornis Camargo & Moure, 1994
- Paratrigona eutaeniata Camargo & Moure, 1994
- Paratrigona euxanthospila Camargo & Moure, 1994
- Paratrigona femoralis Camargo & Moure, 1994
- Paratrigona glabella Camargo & Moure, 1994
- Paratrigona guatemalensis (Schwarz, 1938)
- Paratrigona guigliae Moure, 1960
- Paratrigona haeckeli (Friese, 1900)
- Paratrigona impunctata (Ducke, 1916)
- Paratrigona incerta Camargo & Moure, 1994
- Paratrigona isopterophila (Schwarz, 1934)
- Paratrigona lineata (Lepeletier, 1836)
- Paratrigona lineatifrons (Schwarz, 1938)
- Paratrigona lophocoryphe Moure, 1963
- Paratrigona lundelli (Schwarz, 1938)
- Paratrigona melanaspis Camargo & Moure, 1994
- Paratrigona myrmecophila Moure, 1989
- Paratrigona nuda (Schwarz, 1943)
- Paratrigona onorei Camargo & Moure, 1994
- Paratrigona opaca (Cockerell, 1917)
- Paratrigona ornaticeps (Schwarz, 1938)
- Paratrigona pacifica (Schwarz, 1943)
- Paratrigona pannosa Moure, 1989
- Paratrigona peltata (Spinola, 1853)
- Paratrigona permixta Camargo & Moure, 1994
- Paratrigona prosopiformis (Gribodo, 1893)
- Paratrigona rinconi Camargo & Moure, 1994
- Paratrigona scapisetosa Gonzalez & Griswold, 2011
- Paratrigona subnuda Moure, 1947
- Paratrigona uwa Gonzalez & Vélez, 2007
- Paratrigona wasbaueri Gonzalez & Griswold, 2011
