= Physogastrism =

Enlargement of the abdomen in certain arthropods

Physogastrism or physogastry is a characteristic of certain arthropods (mostly insects and mites), where the abdomen is greatly enlarged and membranous. The most common examples are the "queens" of certain species of eusocial insects such as termites, bees and ants, in which the abdomen swells in order to hold enlarged ovaries, thus increasing fecundity. This means that the queen has the ability to hold more and produce more eggs at one time. Physogastric queens produce an enormous number of eggs which can account for a significant amount of their body weight. In the termite species Macrotermes subhyalinus, eggs can make up a third of their body weight, and a 15-gram queen can produce up to 30 eggs per minute. The physogastric queens' egg production is supported by oocyte proteins supplied by the "queen body fat."

== In termites ==
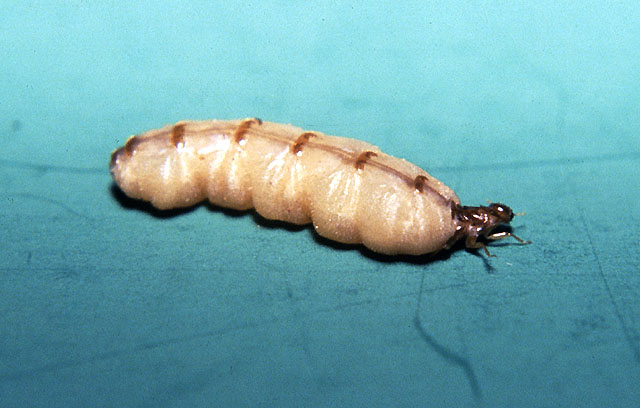
Termite queen

Physogastrism in termites presents itself in quite an unusual manner. Unlike most physogastric insects, the queen termite is able to increase its size without the use of cuticular molting. Rather, the queen unfolds and stretches her abdominal epicuticle in order to make room for the subsequent egg deposits. This process has been observed to be incredibly slow (sometimes over the course of several years).

== In bees ==
Many stingless bee species have physogastric queens, such as the South American species Paratrigona subnuda and Schwarziana quadripunctata. Physogastrism can also be seen in the stingless bee species Melipona bicolor, which is facultatively polygynous, and therefore one or more physogastric queens can be found in the same colony. These queens interact with each other within the colony, and during the patrolling phase, a queen may attempt to touch the abdomen of another queen. The other queen turns her abdomen away, and what follows is the two queens circling one another, trying to touch the other's abdomen; as such, the queens are almost always active.

== In non-social insects and other arthropods ==
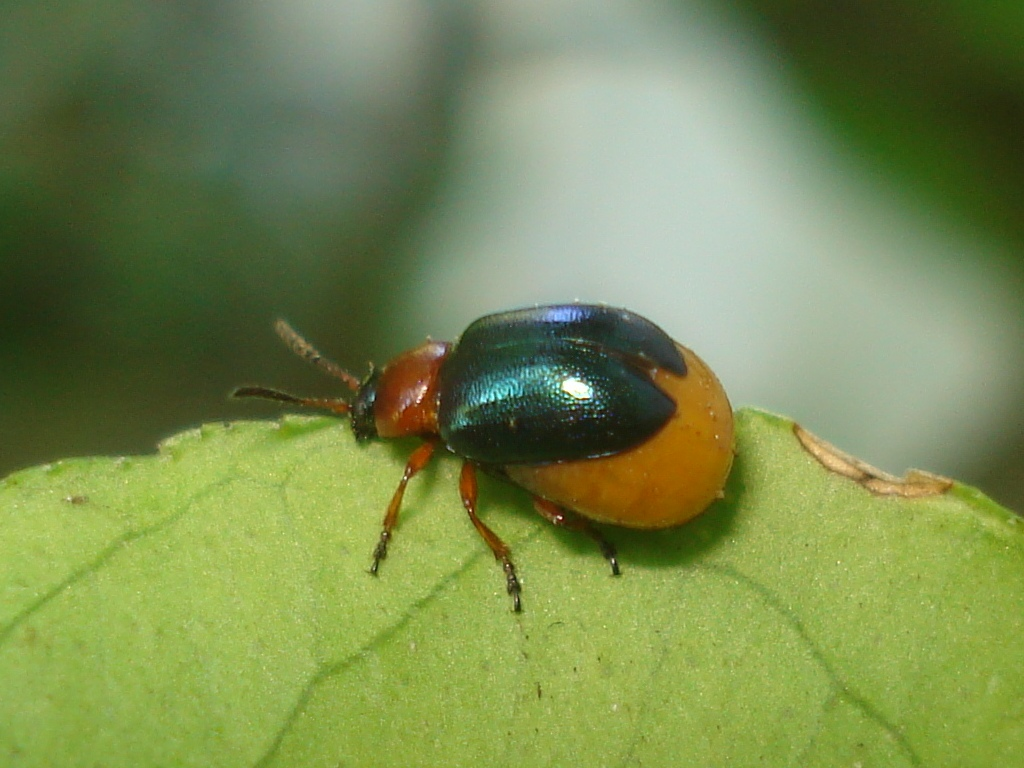
Female of a Gastrophysa species

Various lineages of non-social insects demonstrate various degrees of physogastry, especially among females. The most dramatic and best-known are among the beetles, especially certain groups that live inside ant or termite nests, where the distended abdomen is thought to enhance integration into their hosts' colonies, though it is also seen in several herbivorous beetle lineages such as Chrysomelidae (e.g., Gastrophysa) and Meloidae (e.g., Megetra).

Females of endoparasitic fleas, in particular in the genus Tunga, exhibit severe physogastry once they have penetrated the host's skin and begun to produce eggs.

Many Acari (ticks and mites) have physogastric females, sometimes involving precocious development of offspring inside the mother's body.

== See also ==
- Neosomy
