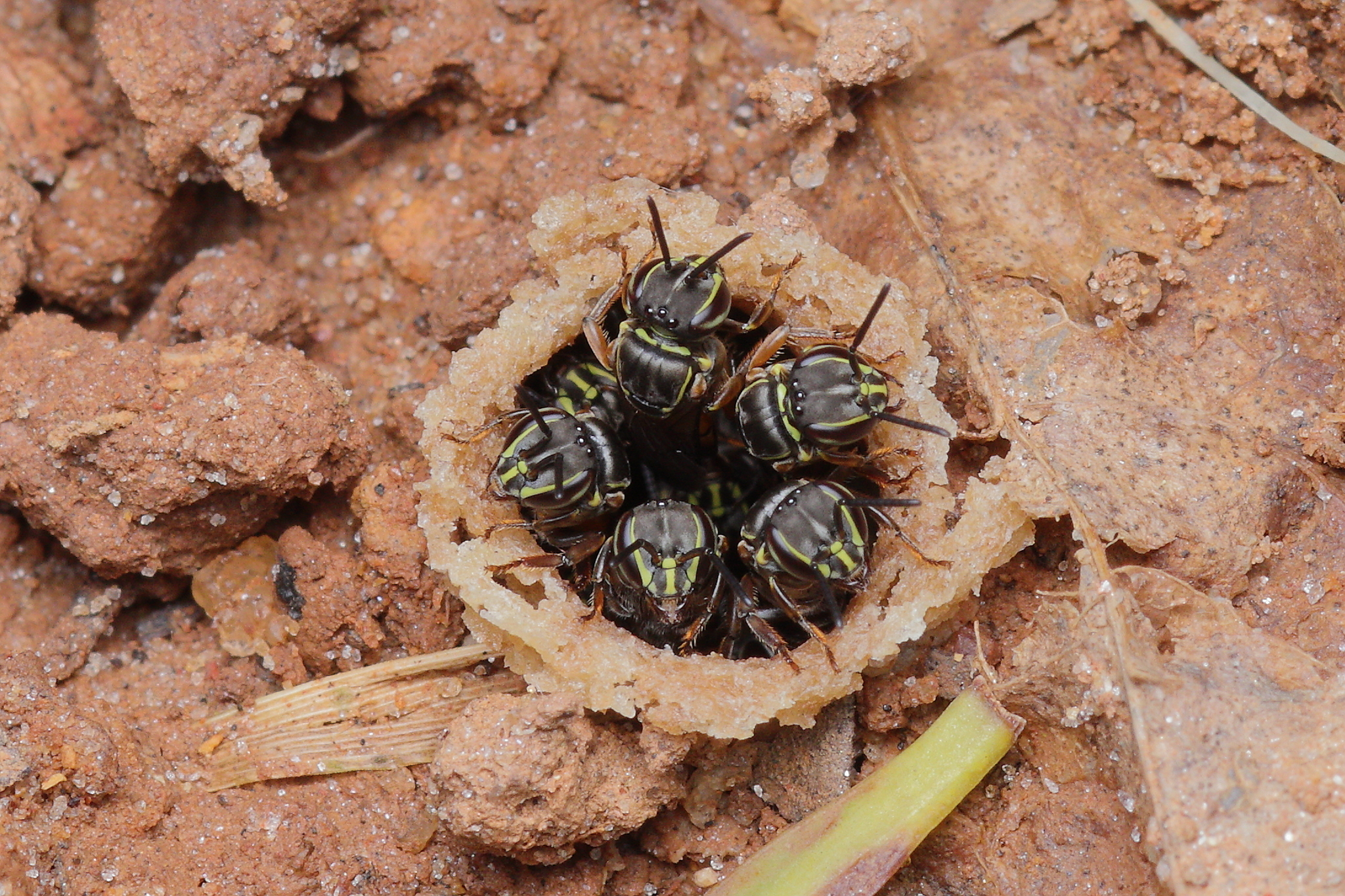

Scientific classification
- Kingdom: Animalia
- Phylum: Arthropoda
- Clade: Pancrustacea
- Class: Insecta
- Order: Hymenoptera
- Family: Apidae
- Genus: Paratrigona
- Species: P. subnuda

Binomial name
- Paratrigona subnuda Schwarz, 1938

= Paratrigona subnuda =

Species of bee

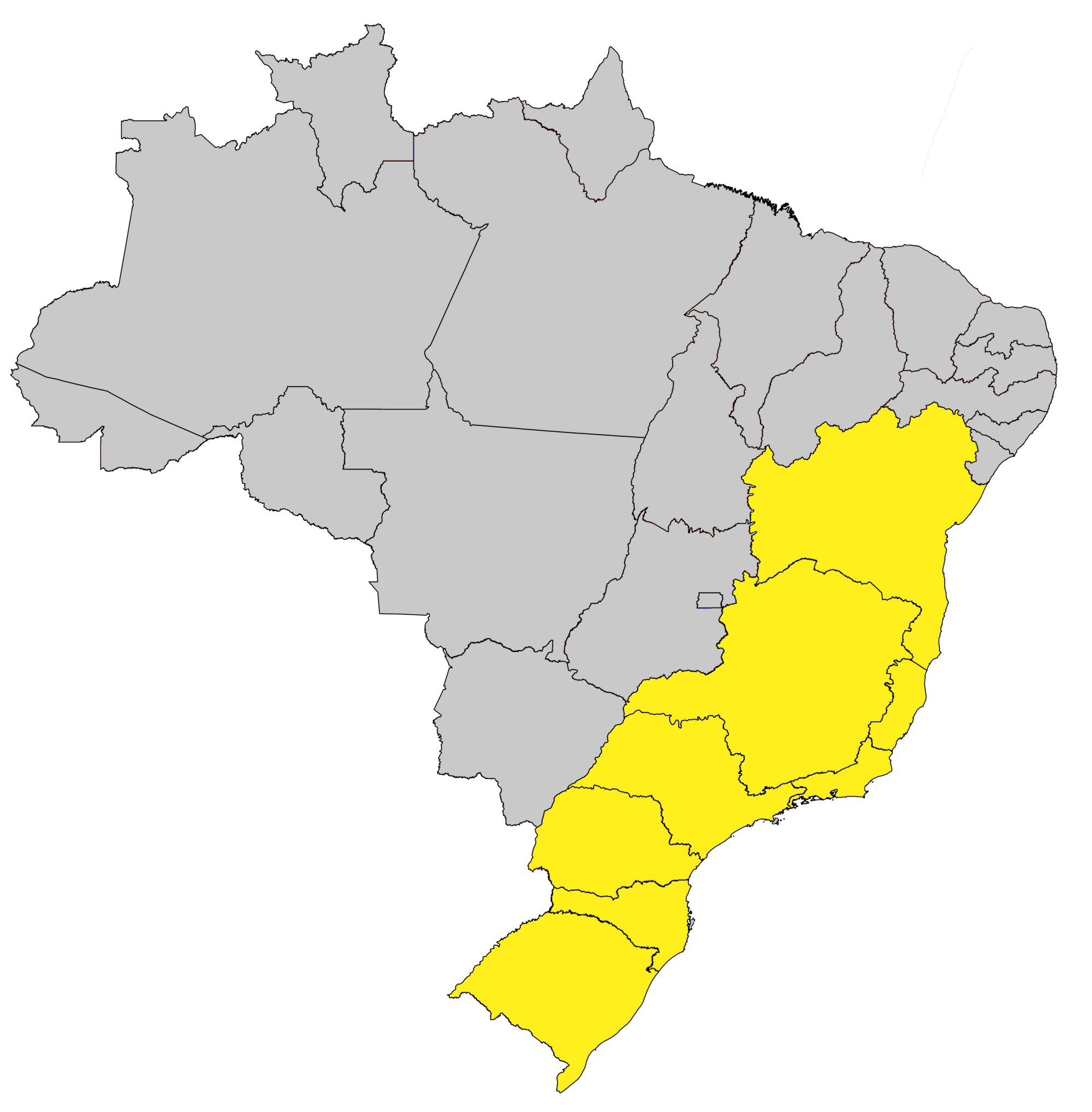
Distribution in Brazil.

Paratrigona subnuda, commonly known as the jataí-da-terra ("ground jataí"), is a species of eusocial stingless bee in the family Apidae and tribe Meliponini. These social bees are prevalent in Neotropical moist forests, including Brazilian Atlantic and other South American forests. They inhabit spherical nests in moist underground environments with their forest habitats. Within their Neotropical habitats the P. subnuda is considered to be a very successful and common species of bee. P. subnuda’s main source of food is pollen and nectar from a large variety of native Mesoamerican tropical plants. They have been extensively studied due to social conflicts arising from single mate behaviors and particular virgin behaviors. P. subnuda also exhibits the particular daily behavior in which they open the nest entrance at dawn and close the entrance at dusk when all their activities are done.

== Taxonomy and phylogeny ==
P. subnuda belongs to the family Apidae, but far exceed the diversity and habitat distribution in comparison to honeybees. Stingless bees arose as a pivotal force in the Neotropics at the end of the Cretaceous period.

P. subnuda belongs to the Meliponini tribe, which is defined by distinctive phenotypic differences of dorsal vessels. P. subnuda also belongs to the genus Paratrigona found specifically in MesoAmerica.

== Description and identification ==
Morphologically, P. subnuda bees express all the features constituted in the Meliponini tribe. This includes reduction of wing venation, stiff setae or penicillum located on the anterior portion of the hind tibia and reduction of the stinger. As a member of the Meliponini tribe, P. subnuda bees also express distinctive dorsal vessel phenotypes. This includes an arch formed by the dorsal vessels between the thorax longitudinal muscles, creating a forward migrated position of the abdominal ganglia and extended digestive tract. In general, Meliponini members also tend to have a denser hair covering, shorter wings, and are larger than their Trigonini tribe counterparts.

There is a very obvious size distinction between the queens and the workers of P. subnuda species. The P. subnuda worker is 0.5-0.8 cm in size and have a smaller head and thorax compared to queen bees. A physogastric queen (contains a swollen abdominal) is about double the size of a worker and are about 1.2-1.8 cm in size. Compared to other Neotropical bees, P. subnuda are considered to be small in size. In that way, P. subnuda's small stature is what distinguishes it within the Meliponni tribe.

== Distribution and habitat ==
P. subnuda bees are found in Neotropical moist forests and urban areas in South America. Their distribution overlaps with many other stingless bee species, with an especially large correlation with Tetragonisca angustula distribution. They have been studied in Minas Gerais, Paraná, Rio de Janeiro, Rio Grande do Sul, Santa Catarina and São Paulo within Brazil. They can also be found in south to east regions of Central Brazil. As mentioned above, their nests are in the soft and moist soil of these neotropical environments. This particular species is considered to be common within Brazilian neotropical habitats.

=== Nest structure ===
The nests of P. subnuda bees are spherical in shape and are relatively small in size (1000–1500 bees). The nest is protected by several sheets of involucrum, which helps keep the nest insulated in the moist underground environments. Within the outer protective involucrum layer is the helicoid brood comb, which contain eggs’ cells. The comb's cells can either be pear-shaped or larger and normal shaped. The nests also include inlet tubes which are built of wax and are long in length. Within a strong colony, there will be approximately 26 cells. These nests are built underground in moist and soft Neotropical soil, and are normally less than one meter deep. In the Brazilian Atlantic forests, these nests were found about 25–120 cm underground. The underground nests of P. subnuda are comparatively more vulnerable than arboreal stingless bee nests, as the underground nests are easier to see and locate.

==== Using abandoned ant nests ====
Excavations of P. subnuda nests showed that their nests were originally occupied and then abandoned by genus Atta (leafcutting ants). This was concluded based on the red and granular soil found around the nests, similar nest design, dark spaces below the P. subnuda nest which correspond to ant chambers, and approximately equal surface of the two species’ nests.

== Colony cycle ==
=== Colony initiation ===
New colony formation is a progressive process within stingless bee species and have been specifically observed in P. subnuda. The new materials, including those for construction and for food, are transported by workers to the site of the new nests. The P. subnuda workers also depart from the new nests with more than one queen from the mother nest. This process of colony initiation is referred to as swarming and is a long lasting process due to lasting relations with mother nests.

=== Colony reproduction ===
Daughter queen bees, also known as gynes, leave the colony for the new colony during nesting. This is partly due to the physogastric queens who are unable to move to swarm to the new colony. There is also contact between the mother queen and the new queen that can last for weeks or months. This phenomenon is a consequence of P. subnuda's single mate behaviors. Under single mating, there is lower conflict between daughter and mother queens. This is due to the fact that there is increased relatedness between daughter queen and the mother queen's progeny. When males are produced by the queen, workers will shift their interest to the daughter queen because they have higher relatedness to the new queen's sons. Unlike other tropical bees, stingless bee colonies only reproduce once a year or sometimes even less.

=== Colony growth ===
Once colonies have been established, they usually are contained in a single nest and have a population of about 1000–1500 bees. In P. subnuda, swarming departure occurs on the same day of the resource transport to the new nest and occurs fast.

== Behavior ==
=== Dominance hierarchy ===
Similar to other stingless bees, P. subnuda females are divided into queens and workers. There are two types of queens within a nest, the one, singly mated queen and virgin daughter queens kept in reserve. Workers are the daughters of the one, singly mated queen. Within P. subnuda, there is a power struggle between the queen and the workers. Due to their larger size, queens are able to aggressively push workers, but ultimately workers are successful in laying eggs. It was later found that workers have specific strategies that allow for oviposition.

=== Oviposition process behavior ===
Singly mated queens of the P. subnuda will lay eggs within the royal cells and will lay a separate egg in each cell which has been supplied with food. Minutes before the queen lays her egg, the workers will regurgitate their food into the cell. The queen will lay her egg on top of this food and then the cell will be closed rapidly by the workers. Workers have mechanisms to disrupt this process and reproduce male progeny.

=== Division of labor ===
Stingless bees, including P. subnuda, have distinctive divisions of labor conducted by different ages and in relation of needs. There are four distinctive jobs done at different times in a worker's lifespan. The first is self-grooming which is performed after the first hours emerging from the pupa. After, there is incubation and brood chamber repairs. This is followed by rearing behaviors, including provisioning cells, construction of cells and cleaning. Workers are also responsible for feeding both the young adult bees and the singly mated queen bee. Workers must also participate in reconstruction behaviors. Reconstruction behaviors include reconstructing involucrum, entrance guard duty, cleaning of the nest, and receiving nectar. Finally, there is also the collection of pollen and nectar that serve as food sources.

=== Communication ===
P. subnuda communicates in a similar way as many other species within the Meliponini tribe. Due to the swarming activities of P. subnuda it is essential that the scout bees are able to locate new nests and worker bees can communicate sources of food. This communication is done through jostling and mandibular secretions. When returning with pollen or nectar, bees will bring back small amounts of that resources for the others bees within the nest. But along the way back to the nest they will fly in an irregular zigzag patterns in all directions. The bees will try to jostle bees who are in their way and alert them resources have been found. Because of this zigzag behavior many times the bees will not actually give the out the small amounts of syrup out to other bees. But researchers are able to observe when they do give out syrup based on when there is an interruption in the zigzag pattern, such as a sharp turn in a semicircle. This particular zigzag behavior was seen in all Brazilian Meliponini species studied. The bees also alert one another by secreting mandible glandular secretions. In flight, the bees will rub their mandibles on the surface of blades of grass and stones. P. subnuda contain the tube-shaped mandibular gland which serve as a reservoir for these secretions. These secretions have a particular scent associated with them and are used by scout bees when establishing paths for new paths and food sources.

=== Mating behaviors ===
Within a P. subnuda colony, there is a single queen that will have one mate who will fertilize all her eggs. The queen will go into a nuptial flight and the male's genitals will become stuck to the genitals of the female, which is a mating sign. In P. subnuda, the males do not congregate at the front of the entrance of virgin queens newly established colony. Workers do have ovarian development and can lay trophic eggs.

=== Foraging behaviors ===
Flight activity is crucial for foraging behaviors of the P. subnuda and is dependent upon many environment factors. These factors include temperature, luminous intensity, relative humidity, rain and wind levels. Their foraging behaviors can also be influenced by biotic factors which include availability of floral resources, their physiology and internal conditions of the colony (food supply and queen productivity). Specifically for P. subnuda, the greatest flight activity was found to arise during temperatures between 24.0 °C and 25.0 °C. They forage for pollen and nectar, which are then stored within nest pots. (cited in Oliveira-Abreu et al. 2014). The bee species, Geotrigona mombuca, is found in the same subterranean habitat and has a similar foraging activity patterns above 22.0 °C. The biogeographical and foraging congruence suggest a possible common history between the two species.

Studies have shown that P. subnuda and Scaptotrigona bipunctata are the most numerically dominant stingless bee foragers of flowers found in Cantareira Forest, accounting for more than 80% of all stingless bees found foraging. They were most commonly found in the upper strata (above 7m) in the Neotropics. Yet, P. subnuda were found foraging in the lower strata during shortage of mass flowering or high availability of attractive flowering in the lower strata. P. subnuda is particularly active in the upper strata as they are “pre-adapted” to forage while exposed to direct sunlight due to their large surface to volume ratio. Foraging in the lower strata during shortage periods represents an example of their opportunistic foraging strategies.

=== Virgin queen behavior ===
P. subnuda virgin queens find refuge in empty foot pots within the nest. When the virgin queens become “attractive,” they develop tergal and mandibular glands and maintain contact with workers. Yet once their glandular products run out, they will then take refuge in pots and use their mandible to seal the pot. How long they stay in the pot can vary from hours to minutes. Before leaving, they will stick their antennas out of the pot to examine their external environment. Once their glandular product has been replenished, they will circulate around the colony again. This process will continue to happen until she is mature. Throughout her maturation, she will over go many different changes in glandular secretions. At the peak of her “attractiveness” she is secreting pheromones and will try to supersede the queen.

=== Workers’ behavior towards gynes ===
P. subnuda and other members of the tribe Meliponini show distinct behavior towards the gynes or royal eggs. It has been observed that new queens are continuously reared and killed by workers bees immediately following their birth. As a result, there is a permanent presence of continuously short-lived gynes. The gynes will be eliminated either by starvation or aggression. Many times the workers will continuously reduce the amount of food donations given to the gyne. As the gynes age, there is a higher risk of being killed due to food deprivation. In periods of intense aggression, the workers can kill a larger number of gynes within a few hours. It is thought that the presence of the queen induces the gynes to discharge their queen pheromones when they are mature enough to do so. The release of their pheromones then initiates the workers to either immediately kill or starve them.

== Kin selection ==
=== Relatedness ===
Due to the single mating behavior, P. subnuda show a haplodiploid genetic structure of social Hymenoptera bees. In this system, the workers will be sisters that are 75% related to one another and are 50% related to the queen. If a worker produces a male it will be 50% related to her, but a queen's son is only 25% related to a worker. In this system, a worker should be direct competition with a queen for male production. Workers are 50% related to their own male progeny and 35% related to the progeny of their sisters. Therefore, the workers have the most fitness benefit when they manipulate the sex allocation in such a way that three times more resources in the queen's female progeny than the male progeny.

=== Worker queen conflict ===
Due to hymenopteran relatedness, there is a conflict between workers and queen for the production of male progeny. Queens will eat the workers' eggs, and some eggs are trophic eggs, perhaps reflecting an evolutionary history of conflict. With their high relatedness, workers gain an extraordinary indirect fitness benefit from helping the queen rear their sisters. The workers have developed two strategies to oppose the queen's male progeny. One strategy is to lay their eggs in reopened cells that contain the recent eggs from the oviposition process. The other strategy is to open cells that have been provisioned 1–2 days earlier and lay their eggs. The queen has the advantage of size to forcefully push the workers in an attempt to stop worker oviposition, but workers were found to return later to lay eggs. As a result of this conflict, worker bees actually contribute 64% of the male progeny within a single colony.

== Diet ==
The main components of P. subnuda’s diet are nectar and pollen. They get their pollen and nectar from over 200 plant species within neotropical environments, including Zanthoxylum hyemale and Baccharis milleflora. As a species, they have been referenced as one of the top three Brazilian Bee species that interact with plant species. P. subnuda are considered to be generalists because their diet consists of pollen and nectar collected from a very large number of floral sources.

== Human Importance ==
P. subnuda are a soft and gentle bee species. It is a species that can be easily handled by humans. The species’ honey is considered to be very tender, flavorful, and possess medicinal qualities.

As of 2006, 26% of stingless bee colonies within the Neotropics of South America have died due to indirect human interference, mainly due to deforestation.
