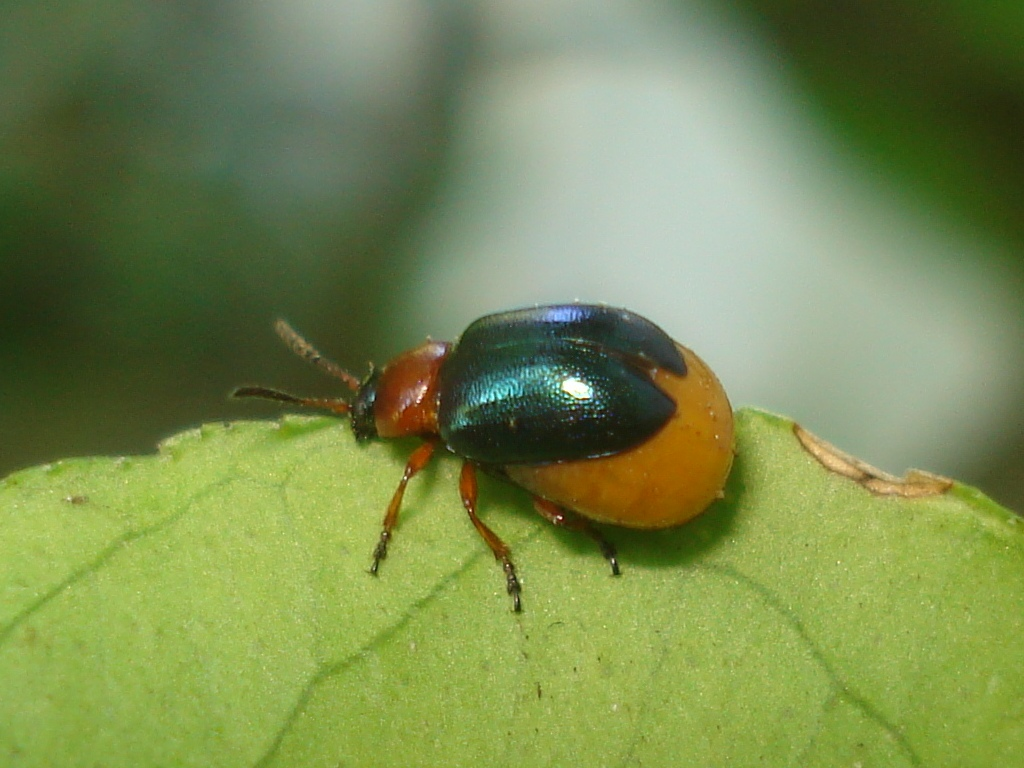
- Female G. polygoni

Scientific classification
- Domain: Eukaryota
- Kingdom: Animalia
- Phylum: Arthropoda
- Class: Insecta
- Order: Coleoptera
- Suborder: Polyphaga
- Infraorder: Cucujiformia
- Family: Chrysomelidae
- Subfamily: Chrysomelinae
- Tribe: Chrysomelini
- Genus: Gastrophysa; Chevrolat, 1836

Synonyms
- Gastroidea Hope, 1840

= Gastrophysa =

Genus of beetles

Gastrophysa is a genus of beetles in the family Chrysomelidae, in which the females typically exhibit swollen, membranous abdomens, a condition known as physogastrism.

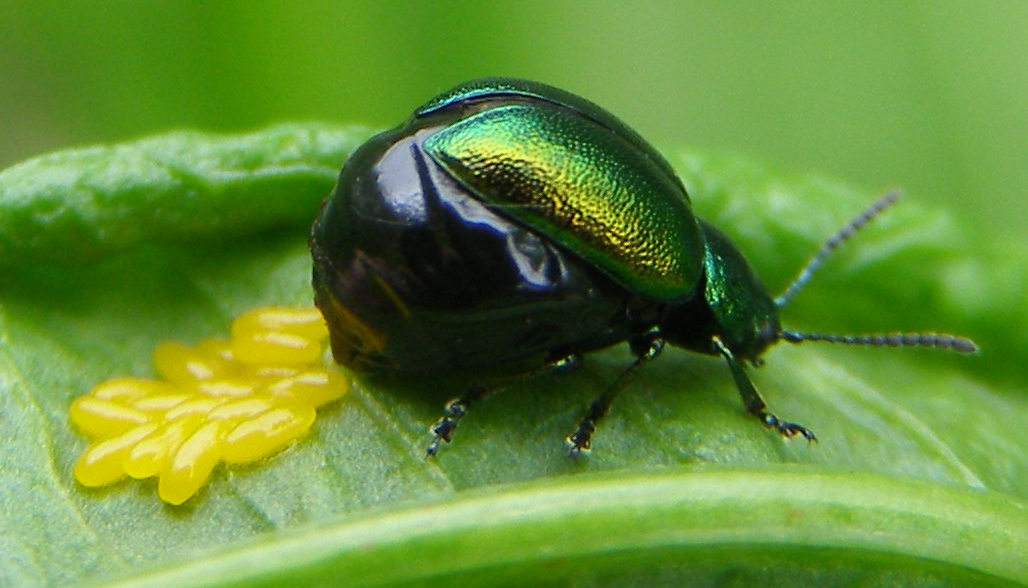
Gastrophysa viridula

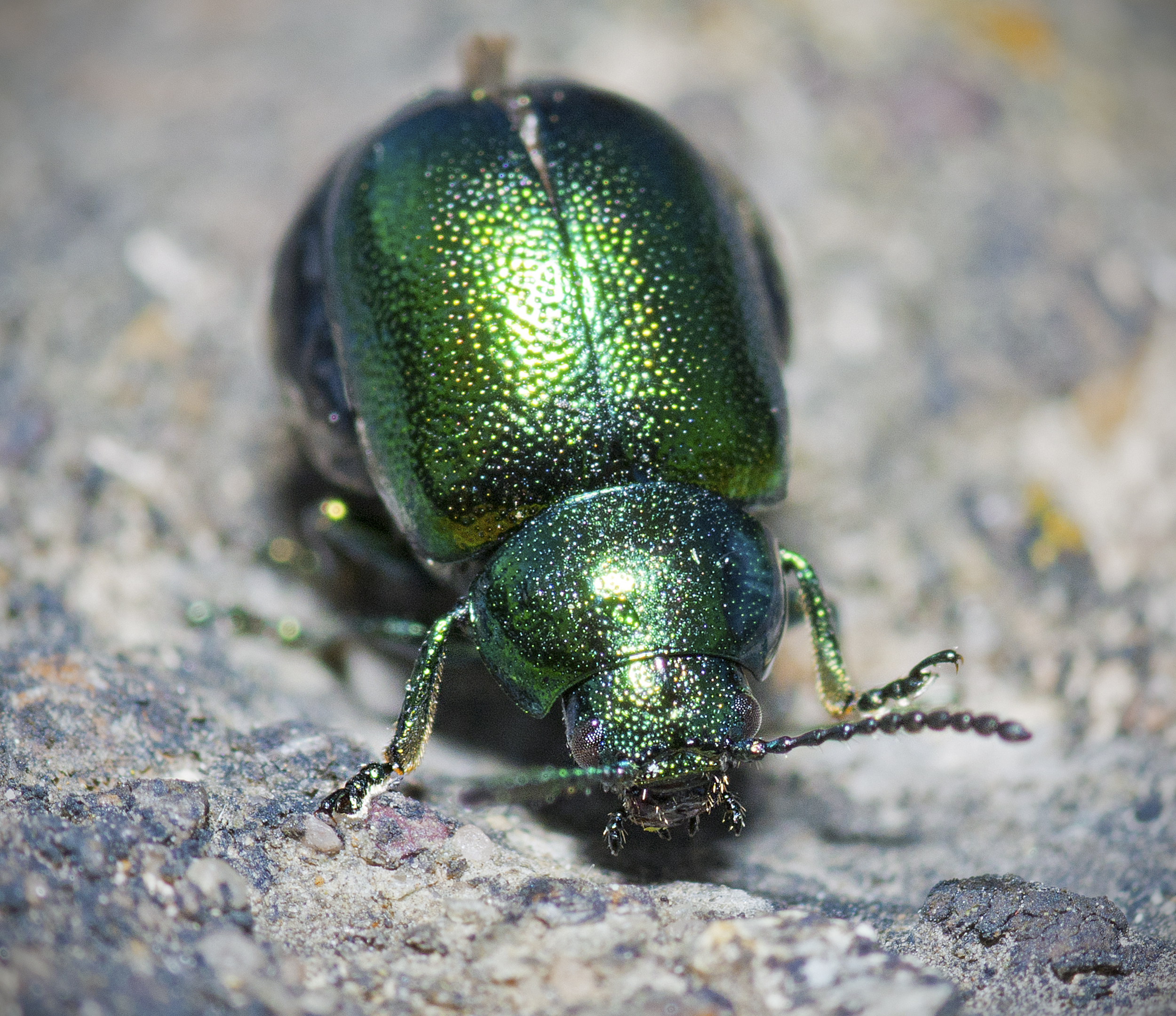
Gastrophysa viridula

== Species ==
These nine species belong to the genus Gastrophysa:

- Gastrophysa analis (Reitter, 1890)^{g}
- Gastrophysa atrocyanea Motschulsky^{g}
- Gastrophysa cyanea F. E. Melsheimer, 1847^{i c g b} (green dock beetle)
- Gastrophysa dissimilis (Say, 1824)^{i c g b}
- Gastrophysa formosa (Say, 1824)^{i c g b}
- Gastrophysa janthina Suffrian, 1851^{g}
- Gastrophysa polygoni (Linnaeus, 1758)^{i c g b} (knotweed leaf beetle)
- Gastrophysa unicolor (Marsham, 1802)^{g}
- Gastrophysa viridula (De Geer, 1775)^{g}

Data sources: i = ITIS, c = Catalogue of Life, g = GBIF, b = Bugguide.net
