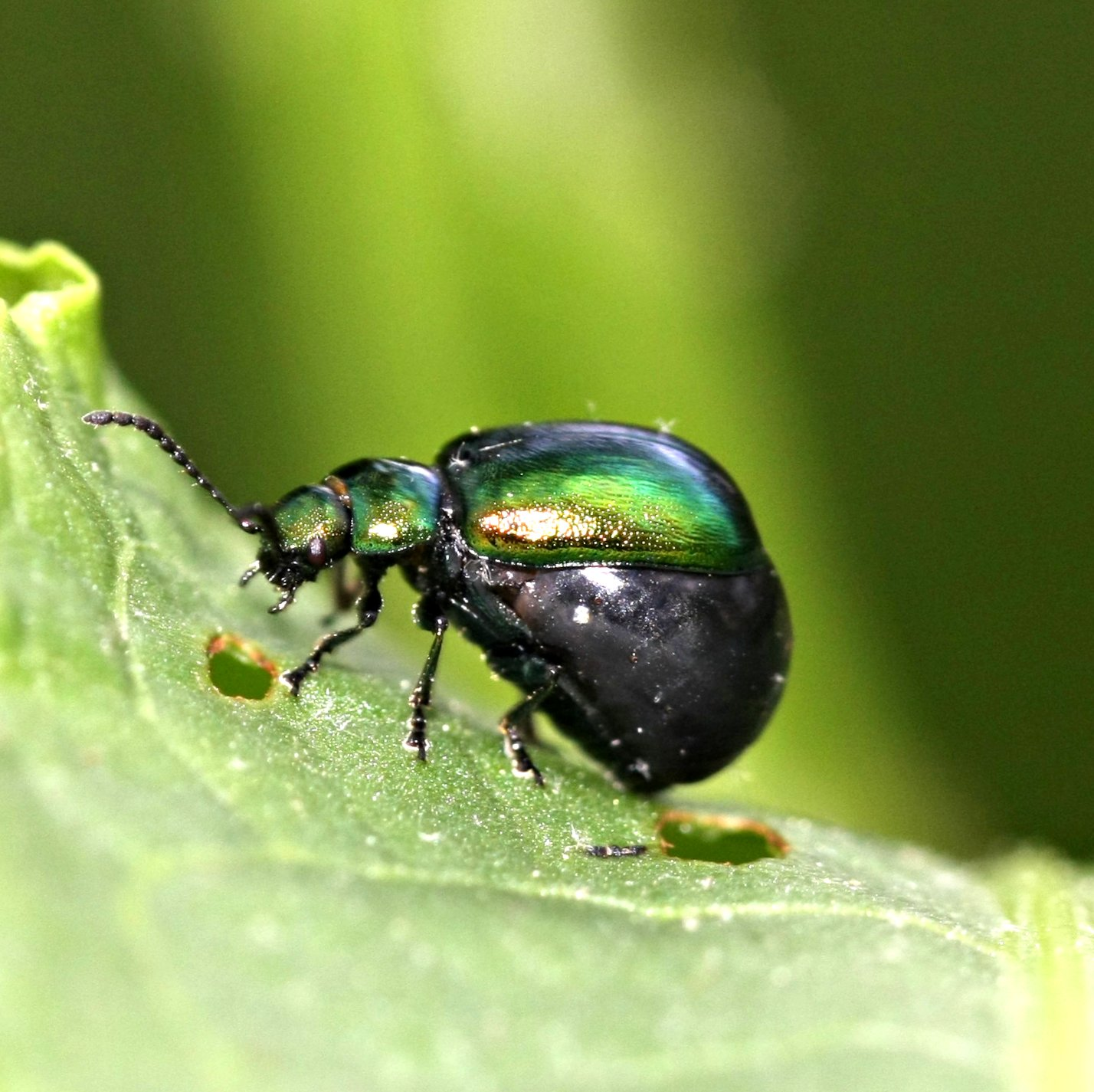
- green dock beetle (female)

Scientific classification
- Domain: Eukaryota
- Kingdom: Animalia
- Phylum: Arthropoda
- Class: Insecta
- Order: Coleoptera
- Suborder: Polyphaga
- Infraorder: Cucujiformia
- Family: Chrysomelidae
- Genus: Gastrophysa
- Species: G. cyanea

Binomial name
- Gastrophysa cyanea F. E. Melsheimer, 1847

= Gastrophysa cyanea =

Species of beetle

Gastrophysa cyanea, the green dock beetle (note: Gastrophysa viridula in Europe is also sometimes called the green dock beetle), is a species of leaf beetle in the family Chrysomelidae. It is found in North America. G. cyanea is 4-5 mm and metallic green. Females can be distinguished by their swollen abdomens prior to egg laying. They emerge in spring and commonly feed on curly dock. Some pinned specimens will turn metallic blue.
