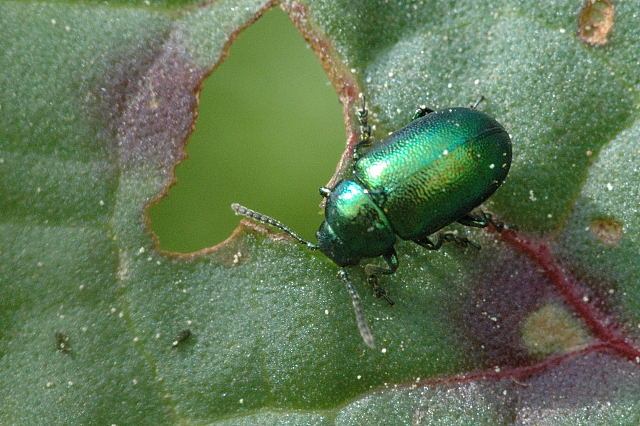

Scientific classification
- Kingdom: Animalia
- Phylum: Arthropoda
- Clade: Pancrustacea
- Class: Insecta
- Order: Coleoptera
- Suborder: Polyphaga
- Infraorder: Cucujiformia
- Family: Chrysomelidae
- Subfamily: Chrysomelinae
- Tribe: Chrysomelini
- Genus: Gastrophysa
- Species: G. viridula

Binomial name
- Gastrophysa viridula (De Geer, 1775)

Synonyms
- Chrysomela viridula De Geer, 1775; Gastroidea viridula (De Geer, 1775); Lamprolina unicolor Jacoby, 1885

= Gastrophysa viridula =

Species of beetle

Gastrophysa viridula, known as the green dock beetle (note: the similar Gastrophysa cyanea in North America is also called the green dock beetle), green dock leaf beetle or green sorrel beetle, is a species of beetle native to Europe.

== Description ==
The length of the green dock beetle varies between sexes, with the males being 4 mm and the females being 7 mm. During the mating season, females have enlarged abdomens. Both sexes are green with a metallic shimmer, which, depending on the light, can be gold green, blue, purple, violet, or red. The legs of this species also shimmer a metallic green, and are strongly built. The antennae are serrated and are medium in length.

=== Subspecies ===
- Gastrophysa viridula pennina (Weise, 1882)
- Gastrophysa viridula viridula (De Geer, 1775)

== Distribution and habitat ==
The green dock beetle is commonly found in central Europe, also common and widespread in Britain. Its range extends eastward into western Siberia and the Caucasus Mountains. They are found in heathlands, forests, meadows, and gardens with the presence of plant dock (Rumex), the beetles' food plant.

== Diet ==
The green dock beetle feeds mainly on dock and green sorrel, rarely feeding on other plants in the families Polygonaceae, Brassicaceae, Violaceae, and Boraginaceae. The larvae can only completely develop on Rumex species.

== Life cycle ==
The green dock beetle's breeding season is from March to October. There are 2 to 4 broods per year, with the last brood hibernating as an adult. The female lays over 1,000 eggs, laying them in clusters of 20 to 45 on the underside of the food plant's leaves. The eggs are oval in shape, and are cream to yellow, turning orange prior to hatching. After about 3 to 6 days, the larva hatches from the egg. It varies in color from greenish gray to dark brown. Its body is segmented, and will reach a length of 8 mm. Young larvae will drop to the ground if disturbed while feeding, while older larvae secrete a substance which repels competitors from eating the food plant leaves. After three instars, the larva pupates in a burrow about 2 cm underground. The adult emerges 6 to 9 days later.

A multilayer composed of chitin layers alternated with layers which also contain melanin is responsible for the green colouration (this phenomenon is known as structural colour). The development has been investigated using advanced imaging techniques, showing that the multilayer forms during pupation and schlerotisation.

== Gallery ==
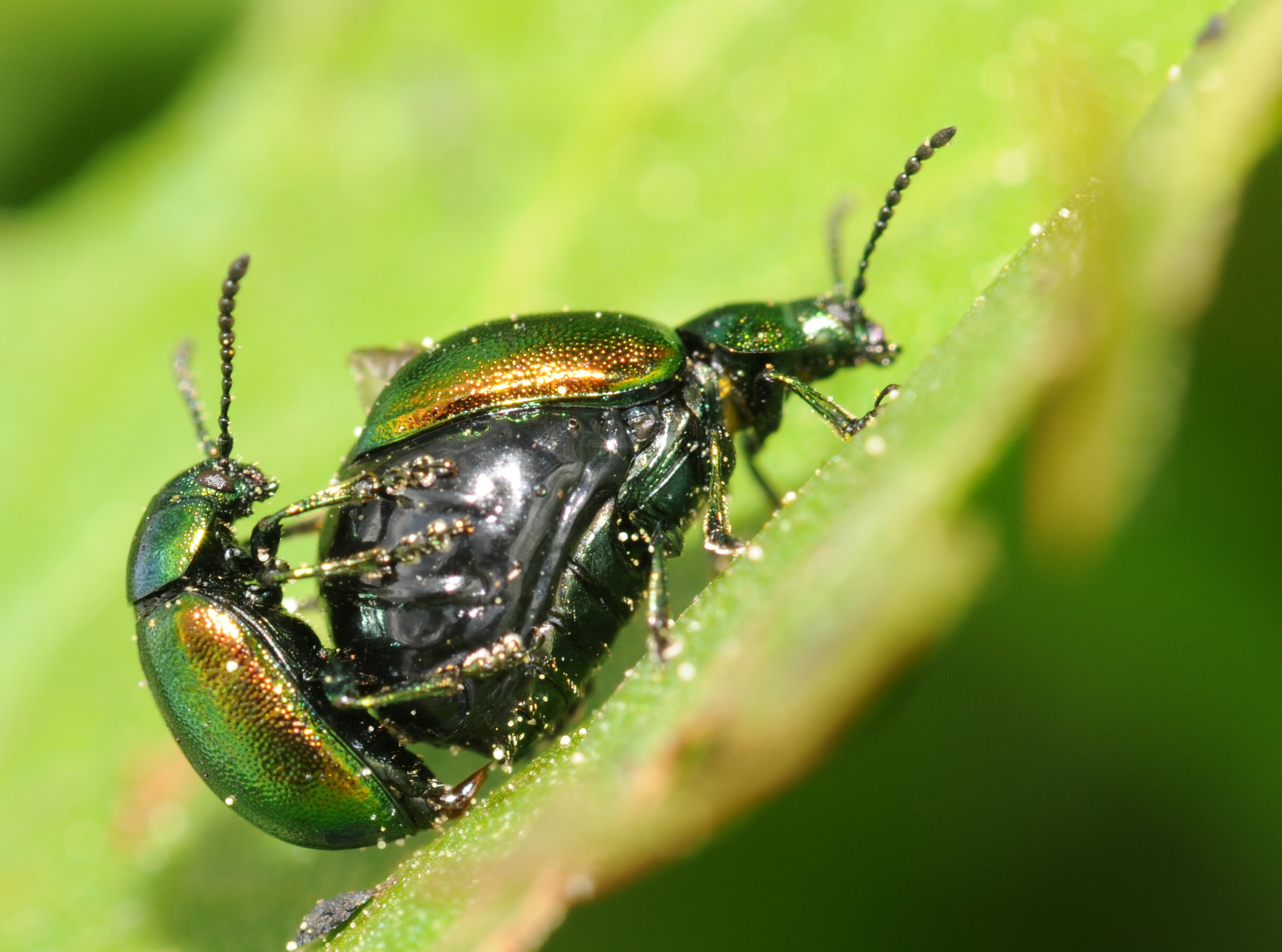
Mating couple

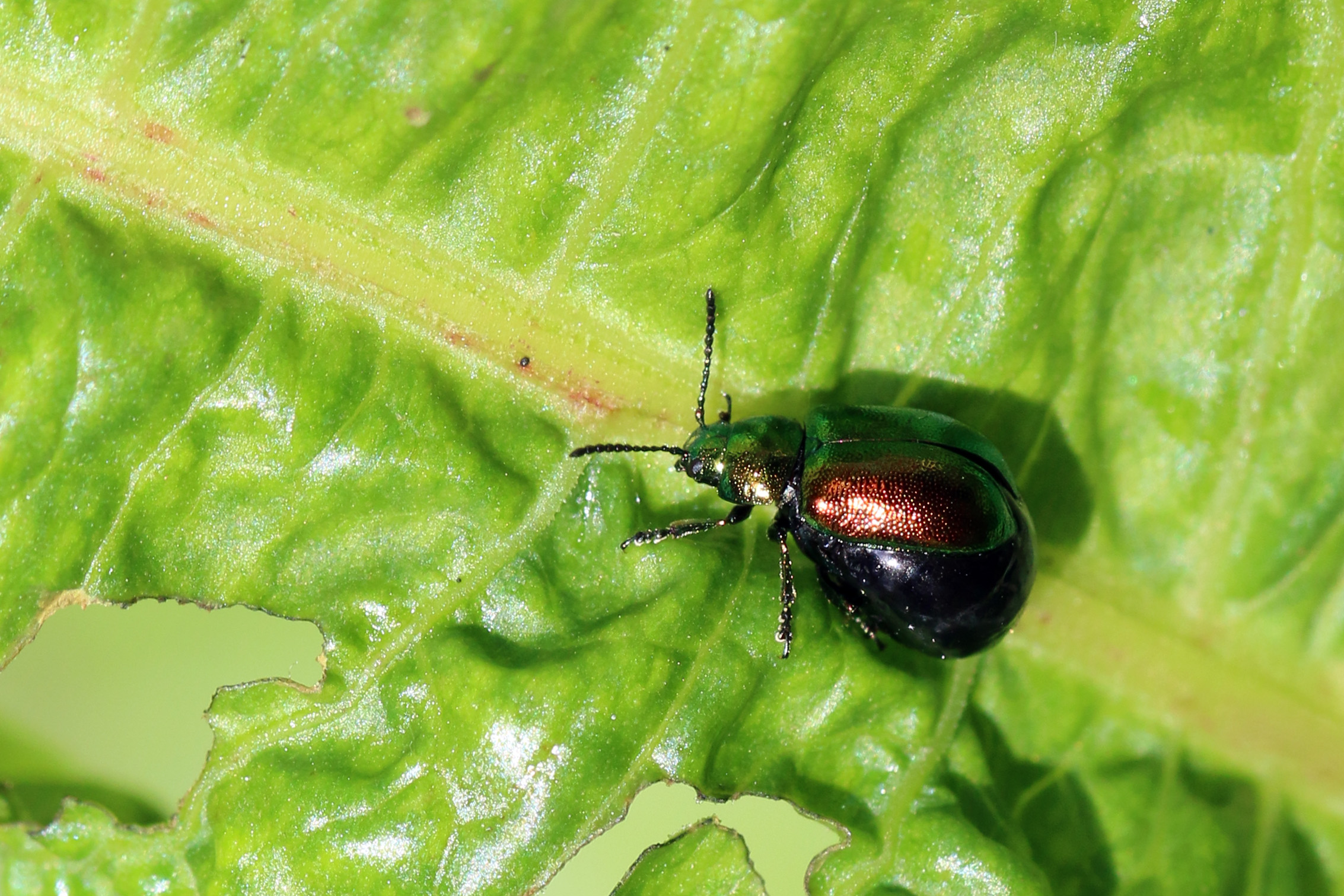
Gravid female

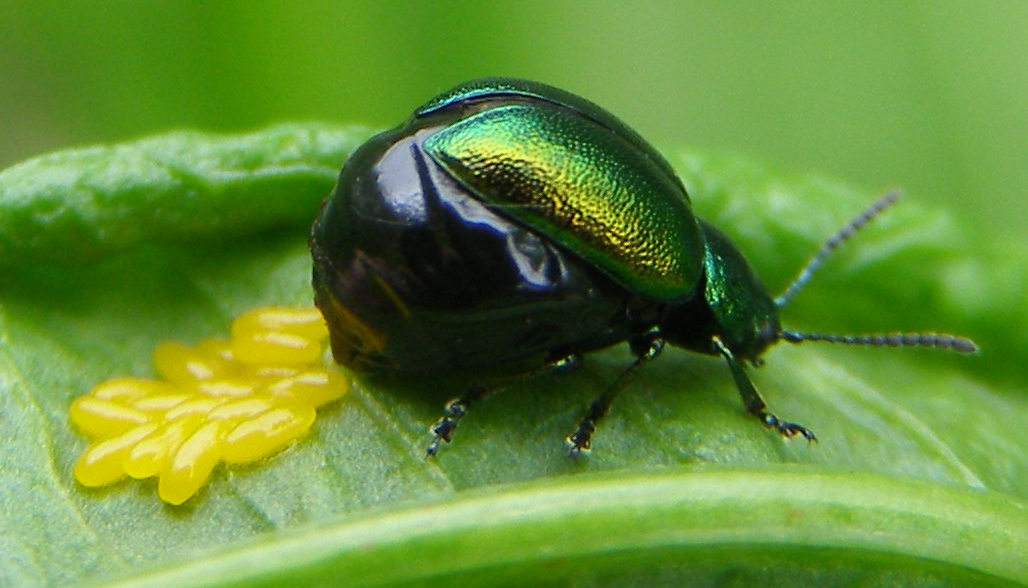
Female laying eggs

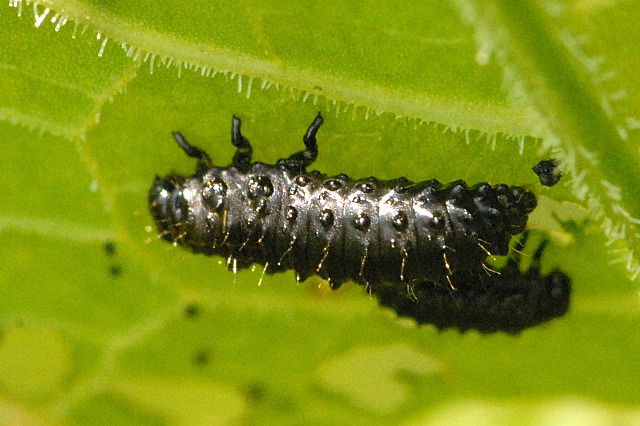
Larvae
