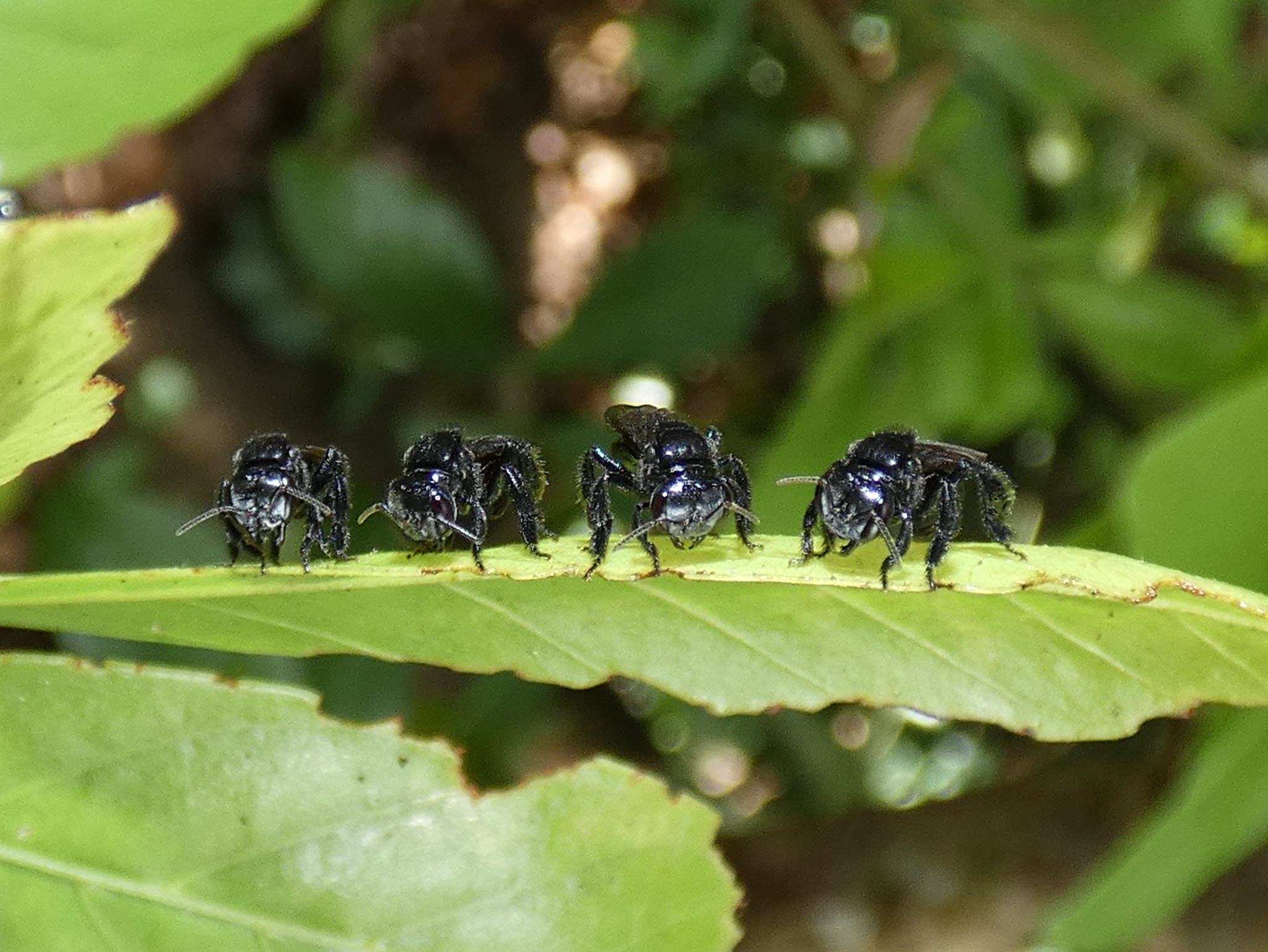

Scientific classification
- Kingdom: Animalia
- Phylum: Arthropoda
- Clade: Pancrustacea
- Class: Insecta
- Order: Hymenoptera
- Family: Apidae
- Genus: Trigona
- Species: T. fuscipennis

Binomial name
- Trigona fuscipennis Friese, 1900
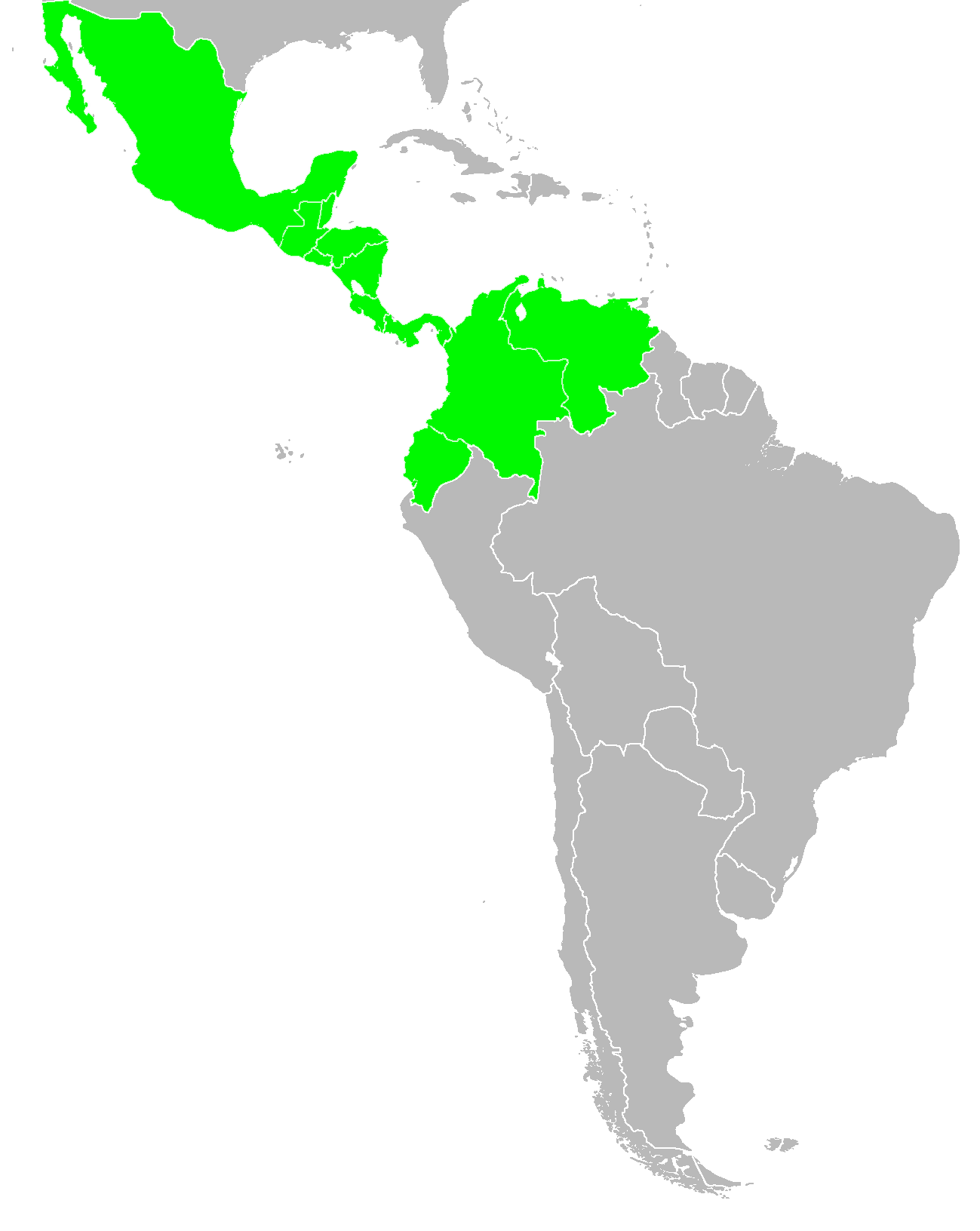
- The range of Trigona fuscipennis

= Trigona fuscipennis =

Species of bee

Trigona fuscipennis is a stingless bee species that originates in Mexico but is also found in Central and South America. They are an advanced eusocial group of bees and play a key role as pollinators in wet rainforests. The species has many common names, including mapaitero, sanharó, abelha-brava, xnuk, k'uris-kab, enreda, corta-cabelo, currunchos, zagaño, and enredapelos.

== Taxonomy and phylogeny ==
Trigona fuscipennis is under the order of Hymenoptera, along with ants, bees, and wasps. It is also part of the Apidae family which encompasses bumble bees, euglossines, honey bees, and stingless bees, and falls in the genus Trigona, which is specific for stingless bees. The genus Trigona is the largest and most diverse group of stingless bees, with over 80 nominal species and about 28 undescribed species. Bees within this genus are notable for their complex communication styles and diverse nest architecture.

== Identification ==
Trigona fuscipennis workers are completely black with one narrow red band just before the apex of the mandibles. They have a short and broad metasoma and a body length of about 5 mm. The antennae do not have the erect black bristles found in other bee species. They are easily mistaken for T. corvina though they are smaller, have slightly different mandible color and do not have erect black bristles. The Trigona queen is dark brown.

== Distribution and habitat ==
Trigona fuscipennis are mainly found in tropical environments. They are native to Mexico but are also found in Middle America and South America. Specifically, they are distributed in the Neoarctic Region which includes Mexico (Campeche, Chiapas, Oaxaca, Puebla, Quintana Roo, Tabasco, Veracruz-Llave, Yucatán) and the Neotropical Region which includes Belize, Colombia (Antioquia, Bolivar, Cundinamarca, Magdalena, Valle del Cauca), Costa Rica (Alajuela, Guanacaste, Limón, Puntarenas, San José), Ecuador (Esmeraldas, Guayas), El Salvador (Sonsonate), Guatemala (Alta Verapaz, Chiquimula, Escuintla, Guatemala, Izabal, Suchitepéquez, Zacapa), Honduras (Atlántida, Colón, Francisco Morazán), Nicaragua (Chinandega, Chontales), Panama (Chiriquí, Coclé, Colón, Herrera, Los Santos, Panamá, Veraguas), and the Panama Canal Zone. They also have a range of altitude distributions. In Guanacaste, Costa Rica, Trigona fuscipennis were found in lower altitudes between 200 and 500 m.

=== Nest architecture ===
Trigona fuscipennis almost always build nests in cavities or hollows made by birds in termite nests. The entrance is funnel or ear shaped, up to 13 cm wide and only projects about 3 cm from the nest's surface. The internal structure of their nests are supported by pillars and beams, made out of cerumen, that go across the brood. The nests also have globular pot-like wax cell clusters. In general, nests are constructed using wax mixed with resins, mud, feces, or other materials, otherwise known as batumen. Nests of the genus Trigona are built in cavities that can support these batumen plates created by the bees to shield and protect the colonies. Trigona fuscipennis bees utilize cavities in aerial termite nests specifically, though the termites are entirely gone, and have their nests attached to lianas. They try to build nests in trees with a minimum of 35 cm diameter of tree trunks for their nests. But they may also share a tree species with other species of bees, though they do not inhabit a particular tree species or share with a particular bee species. For example, a Trigona capitata nest has been found in the same tree as a Trigona fuscipennis nest but Trigona capitata and T. fulviventris nests have also been found together in one tree as well.

== Colony cycle ==
Pheromones and odor trails are used to find new nest sites and establish uniform colony spacing within the species and with other species such as T. silvestriana and T. fulviventris (interspecific colony spacing). It has been hypothesized that potential nest sites are marked with a pheromone and the odor attracts other T. fuscipennis workers. If workers from more than one colony are attracted, then they fight aggressively for the site. But if rival colonies have an equal number of colony workers present, then a stalemate occurs and neither colony occupies the site. Once the new nest site has been found and fought for, workers then prepare it for occupancy. The bees swarm to construct a new nest over a period of days to weeks. They transport materials and resources, such as wax, nectar and pollen from the old nest to the new nest. Building the nest entrance and lining the cavity walls are the first tasks of the worker bees. Once it is ready, the new queen along with a cohort of workers leave from the parent colony to occupy the new nest. After establishment of the new colony, the connection with the old nest still continues for some time.

There are around 3,500 – 4,000 workers in a colony.

=== Division of labor ===
Trigona females are divided into castes composed of queens and workers. Their division of labor is similar to that of honeybees. The different tasks for the workers are dependent on having certain tasks at certain ages. The order of the activities workers perform can be divided into stages: (1) self grooming during the first few hours after emergence from the pupae, (2) incubation and brood chamber repairs, (3) construction and provisioning of cells, nest cleaning, and feeding young adults and the queen, (4) nest cleaning, reconstruction of the involucrum, nectar maintenance, and guarding the nest and (5) collection of pollen, nectar, and propolis.

== Diet ==
Trigona fuscipennis are polylectic bees, meaning they visit various different flowering plants. However, they also collect other resources such as membracid exudates or dead animals’ flesh. They are high-density specialists, and so they forage in groups and visit only the densest clumps of flowers. In Brazil, Trigona fuscipennis frequently visit and pollinate the Brazil nut tree (Bertholletia excelsa), while in Costa Rica, they obtain nectar from the shrub Cassia biflora which is found in much of Central America and is the most common flower during the dry season of the Guanacaste area of Costa Rica.

== Behavior ==
=== Mating ===
The queen is the mother and the only bee in the hive that reproduces. Males are only produced when new queens are produced. Males and new queens leave the nest to find mates and then the males die and the mated queens start their own hive. Virgin queens accompany swarms of workers to new nest sites and males wait in anticipation, picking up on the odors the queen disperses throughout the nest. The new queen flies out for mating and is pursued by hundreds of males. The queen puts herself at risk during these matings as it exposes her to predation and many are killed.

=== Foraging behavior ===
To find a food source, Trigona fuscipennis bees often rely on food odors. Once they found a preferred odor, they returned to flowers with the same scent, and new recruited individuals also visit the same floral scent as the first foraging bee. They use pheromones in odor trails to communicate the location of the food source. Some bees use local enhancement or local inhibition to find food sources. Local enhancement is used to describe the attraction of animals to a food source due to the presence of other feeding individuals or to odors left behind by individuals previously at the site. Local inhibition is the opposite – animals are deterred from a food source because of the presence of other individuals or of odors they had left behind. Trigona fuscipennis bees exhibit neither local enhancement or local inhibition. They visit various flowers regardless of whether they have been visited or not by other individuals.

==== Parasitic nectar stealing ====
Trigona fuscipennis bees have been found to engage in nectar robbery or act as pollen thieves by perforating the flower to collect nectar and pollen without pollinating it.

==== Pollen collecting behavior ====
Though Trigona fuscipennis collect pollen from a variety of plants, making them a polylectic bee species, in some plants, they collect pollen in a special way using a biting method. To extract pollen, they use their mandibles to make small holes at or close to the base of the tubular anthers of the flower. Collection of pollen is achieved through these with the use of the proboscis. The pollen is then moved on to the thoracic sternum with the help of its fore legs and the bee flies away once it cannot fit anymore pollen on its thoracic sternum. While hovering in mid flight, not too far away from the flower, the bee transfers the pollen to its corbiculae by using its fore legs to move the pollen from its thoracic sternum to its middle legs which then move it to the corbiculae on its hind legs, which are moved slightly forward to help make the pollen transfer process easier. Once there is enough pollen on its hind legs, the bee flies away from the vicinity of the flower.

=== Honey production ===
The honey of the Trigona fuscipennis species is sour and watery. To protect their honey from bacterial contamination, Trigona fuscipennis bees use the enzyme glucose oxidase, stored in their hypopharyngeal glands. Glucose oxidase works to protect from bacteria by causing an accumulation of hydrogen peroxide in the honey while it ripens.

== Defense mechanisms ==
=== Nest and predator defense ===
In order to prevent small insects, parasites, and ants from entering the nest, T. fuscipennis workers use resin as a repellent. Workers collect resin that a female Centris bee deposits on terminal nest cells to place on external entrance tubes of the nest.

With regards to active defense, attraction, landing, buzzing and angular flights are typical alarm behaviors. Biting is also a prominent form of defense among T. fuscipennis bees and they make use of their strong, sharp five-toothed mandibles. Trigona fuscipennis bees have been discovered to engage in suicidal biting in order to defend the nest and against predators. Humans standing in the vicinity of nests are almost always attacked and experience painful bites. The bees also crawl over the intruder into the ears, eye, mouth, and other cavities. The Trigona workers give a painful and persistent bite, are difficult to remove, and usually die during the attack. They have long durations of the attacks as well, with one recorded at 51 minutes and 45 seconds. Trigona bees also have the most painful bites as compared to Partamona helleri, Scaptotrigona depilis, Tetragona clavipes, Tetragonisca angustula, Frieseomelitta varia, Melipona scutellaris, Melipona quadrifasciata, and Melipona rufiventris.

== Interactions with other species ==
=== Competition ===
Trigona fuscipennis are very aggressive bees. They are known to be aggressive and attack other competitive bees to drive them away. With respect to the Brazil nut tree, Trigona fuscipennis were even found to drive away natural pollinators like Bombus and Xylocopa when they tried to penetrate the flower. They impede and drive away other bees by biting the base of their antennas, legs, and wings. Sometimes the presence of dead Trigona bees on the flowers is enough to keep away other bees. They also often displace T. fulviventris from natural food sources. They defend their foraging patches against other bees by using their mandibles to harass, bite and kill competitors.

=== Coexistence ===
Trigona fuscipennis are high-density specialists. This enables them to coexist with other stingless bees using “density specialization”. The targeted resources are different between the species with one foraging on a high density clump of flowers and the other foraging on low density clumps of flowers. One species they coexist with is Trigona fulviventris, which are low-density specialists. T. fuscipennis and T. fulviventris both forage on the pollen of Cassia biflora. T. fuscipennis actively try to visit plants within a clump with the most flowers and those near to their nests. While T. fulviventris visit isolated plants with significantly fewer flowers and clumps farther away from nests and neighbors. Though Trigona fulviventris have a tendency to forage on low-density shrubs, the bees of the Trigona fuscipennis species also drive away T. fulviventris from the densely clumped flowers if they get too close. But there is relatively little overlap since the target resources are different for both species There is an interspecific competition between the two species in particular.

=== Predators and parasites ===
The species has many predators with the main being birds, humans, mustelids, bears, anteaters (Tamandua, Myrmecophaga), armadillos and opossums. They must also deal with nest infiltrators and parasites as well. In Trigona fuscipennis' nests, parasitic mites have been found to infest their larvae. It has also been found that some species have adapted to mimic Trigona fuscipennis nests in order to capitalize on the species' known aggression. Trigona necrophaga, in particular, mimics the nest structure of T. fuscipennis by having a similar large-scooped nest entrance. However, T. necrophaga are not aggressive.

=== Human importance ===
Like other pollinating bees, Trigona fuscipennis play a key role in making sure flowers are pollinated and thrive. As a tropical bee species, they are key pollinators in wet rainforests. They are also important pollinators for wild plants and agricultural crops in the tropics as well as for macadamia, coconut, mango, and chayote. In the society of the Kayapoó Indians in Brazilian Amazon, some bees, including Trigona fuscipennis are associated with crop success and thus, are encouraged to nest near village fields. To encourage the establishment of bee nests, they create a suitable environment by digging large holes covered by dry logs. The Trigona fuscipennis are attracted to these logs and build their nests in the hole.
