= Megachile abdominalis =

Scientific classification
- Kingdom: Animalia
- Phylum: Arthropoda
- Class: Insecta
- Order: Hymenoptera
- Family: Megachilidae
- Genus: Megachile
- Species: M. abdominalis

Binomial name
- Megachile abdominalis Smith, 1853

Species of leafcutter bee (Megachile)

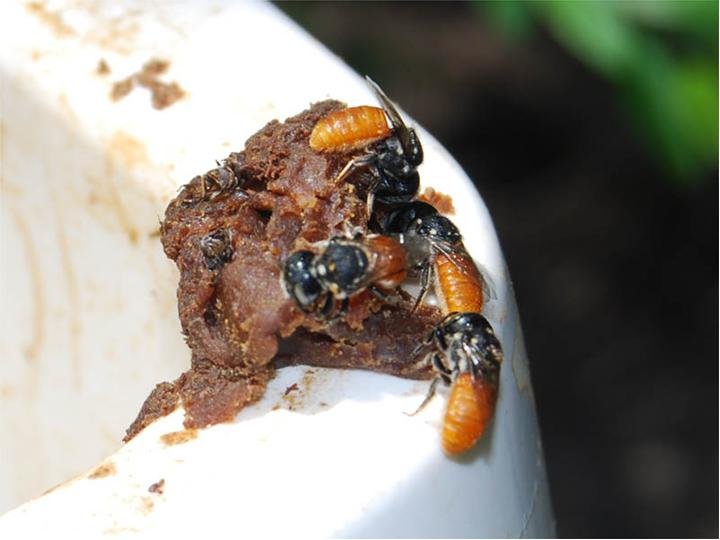
Megachile abdominalis adults gathering Trigona nest resin

Megachile abdominalis is a species of bee in the family Megachilidae. It was described by Frederick Smith in 1853. The species can be found in northern and eastern Australia.
