= Acoma (beetle) =

Scientific classification
- Kingdom: Animalia
- Phylum: Arthropoda
- Clade: Pancrustacea
- Class: Insecta
- Order: Coleoptera
- Suborder: Polyphaga
- Infraorder: Scarabaeiformia
- Family: Scarabaeidae
- Subfamily: Melolonthinae
- Genus: Acoma; Casey, 1889

Genus of beetles

Acoma is a genus of May beetles and junebugs in the family Scarabaeidae. There are at least 35 described species in the genus Acoma. The species of Acoma are largely allopatric.

ITIS Taxonomic note:

- Beetle genus Acoma Casey, 1889 is a senior homonym of nematode genus Acoma Steiner, 1920.

== Description ==
Acoma have reduced mandibles. Their elytra are shaped like elongated ovals with the widest part being at the middle.

Female Acoma are all presumed to be flightless.

== Distribution ==
Acoma are found in the warm Chihuahuan and Sonoran Deserts, and thorn-scrub habitats from western Texas to California in the USA, and Chihuahua, Sonora, and the entire length of the Baja California peninsula in Mexico.

== Species ==
- Acoma arizonica Brown, 1929
- Acoma brunnea Casey, 1889
- Acoma cazieri Saylor, 1948
- Acoma chihuahuaensis Evans & Smith, 2020
- Acoma cimarron Warner, 2011
- Acoma confusa Van Dyke, 1928
- Acoma conjuncta Howden, 1962
- Acoma dilemma Saylor, 1948
- Acoma diminiata Howden, 1958
- Acoma eusexfoliata Evans & Smith, 2020
- Acoma evansi Howden, 1962
- Acoma gibsoni Howden, 1962
- Acoma glabrata Cazier, 1953
- Acoma granulifrons Howden, 1958
- Acoma howdenorum Warner, 2011
- Acoma incognita Howden, 1958
- Acoma knulli Howden, 1958
- Acoma leechi Cazier, 1953
- Acoma martini Howden, 1962
- Acoma mimica Howden, 1962
- Acoma minuta Cazier, 1953
- Acoma mixta Howden, 1958
- Acoma nonglabrata Evans & Smith, 2020
- Acoma ochlera Howden, 1958
- Acoma pararobusta Evans & Smith, 2020
- Acoma parva Howden, 1958
- Acoma quadrilaminata Warner, 2011
- Acoma robusta Van Dyke, 1928
- Acoma rossi Saylor, 1948
- Acoma rufula Howden, 1958
- Acoma seticollis Howden, 1958
- Acoma sexfoliata Saylor, 1948
- Acoma stathamae Cazier, 1953
- Acoma stathami Cazier, 1953
- Acoma westcotti Warner, 2011
