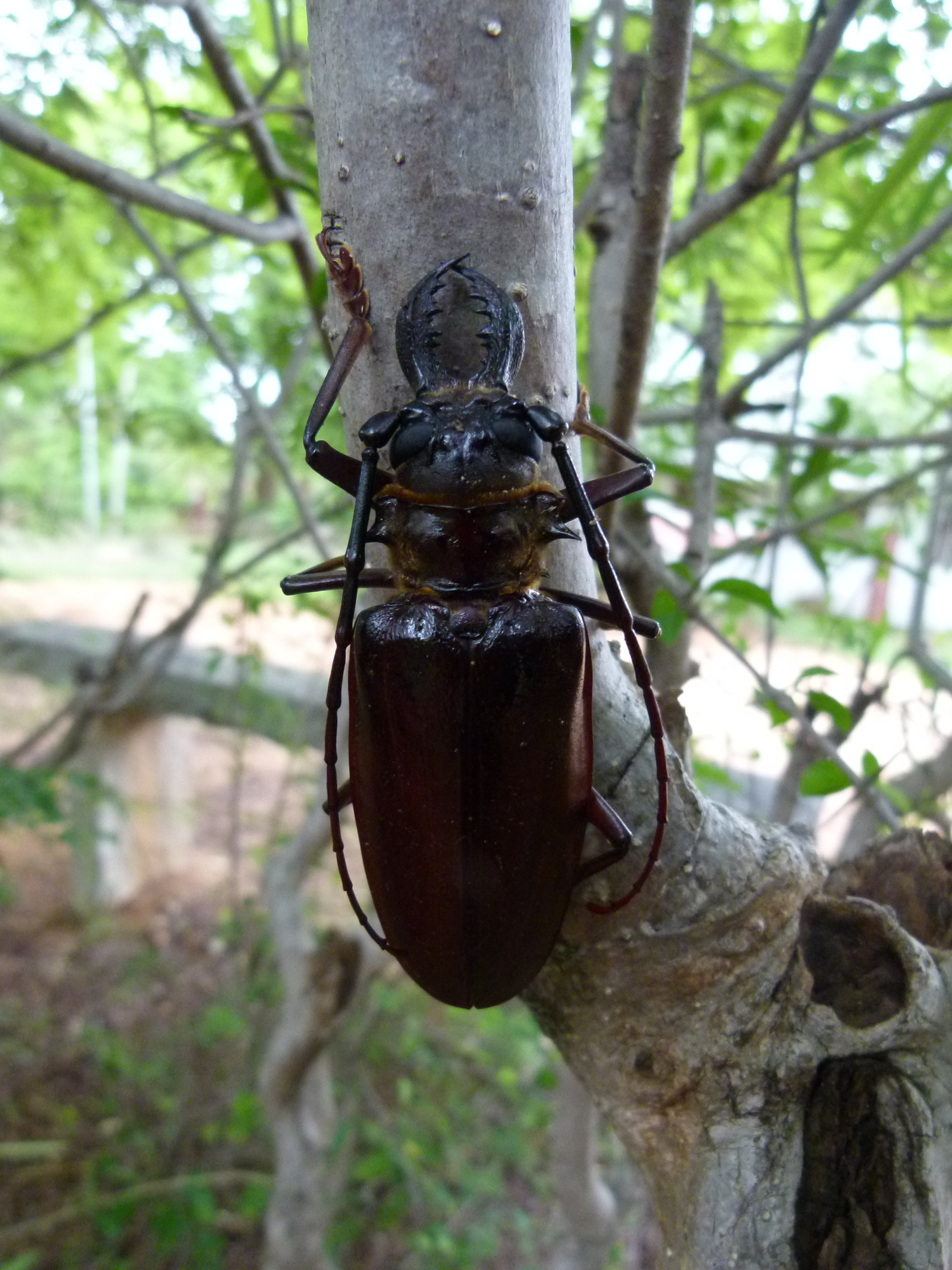

Scientific classification
- Domain: Eukaryota
- Kingdom: Animalia
- Phylum: Arthropoda
- Class: Insecta
- Order: Coleoptera
- Suborder: Polyphaga
- Infraorder: Cucujiformia
- Family: Cerambycidae
- Subfamily: Prioninae
- Tribe: Acanthophorini
- Genus: Acanthophorus; Audinet-Serville, 1832
- Species: A. serraticornis

Binomial name
- Acanthophorus serraticornis (Olivier, 1795)

= Acanthophorus =

Species of beetle

Acanthophorus is a genus of prionine longhorn beetles from the Indian subcontinent. It is monotypic, being represented by the single species Acanthophorus serraticornis. Other species that were formerly included in the genus are now placed in other genera.

Growing to nearly 10 cm (4 in) long, they are among the largest beetles of India. These beetles are reddish to brownish. The mandibles vary in size with some males having much larger mandibles than the females. These bear two to three strong teeth from midway to the tip. The antennae are twelve segmented with the fifth to the eleventh having a spiny outgrowth at the tip.
