= Acoma conjuncta =

Scientific classification
- Kingdom: Animalia
- Phylum: Arthropoda
- Clade: Pancrustacea
- Class: Insecta
- Order: Coleoptera
- Suborder: Polyphaga
- Infraorder: Scarabaeiformia
- Family: Scarabaeidae
- Genus: Acoma
- Species: A. conjuncta

Binomial name
- Acoma conjuncta Howden, 1962

Species of beetle

Acoma conjuncta is a species of scarab beetle in the family Scarabaeidae. It is known from Texas, USA.
