= Acoma diminiata =

Scientific classification
- Kingdom: Animalia
- Phylum: Arthropoda
- Clade: Pancrustacea
- Class: Insecta
- Order: Coleoptera
- Suborder: Polyphaga
- Infraorder: Scarabaeiformia
- Family: Scarabaeidae
- Genus: Acoma
- Species: A. diminiata

Binomial name
- Acoma diminiata Howden, 1958

Species of beetle

Acoma diminiata is a species of scarab beetle in the family Scarabaeidae.Scarabaeidae. It is found in New Mexico, the Southwestern United States.

Acoma diminiata measure 4.3–5.7 mm (0.17–0.22 in) in length.
