= Nymphaea pulchella =

Scientific classification
- Kingdom: Plantae
- Clade: Tracheophytes
- Clade: Angiosperms
- Order: Nymphaeales
- Family: Nymphaeaceae
- Genus: Nymphaea
- Subgenus: Nymphaea subg. Brachyceras
- Species: N. pulchella

Binomial name
- Nymphaea pulchella DC.

Synonyms
- Castalia pulchella (DC.) Britton; Nymphaea ampla subsp. pulchella (DC.) Lovassy; Nymphaea ampla var. pulchella (DC.) Casp.; Nymphaea ampla var. hookeri Planch.; Nymphaea ampla var. salzmannii Planch.; Nymphaea ampla subsp. speciosa (Mart. & Zucc.) Lovassy; Nymphaea ampla var. speciosa (Mart. & Zucc.) Casp.; Nymphaea leiboldiana Lehm.; Nymphaea lineata A.St.-Hil.; Nymphaea nervosa Lehm.; Nymphaea speciosa Mart. & Zucc.; Nymphaea trisepala Gaudich.; Nymphaea tropaeolifolia Lehm.

Species of water lily

Nymphaea pulchella is a species of waterlily native to the regions spanning from Central and Southern Mexico to Brazil, as well as from the Bahamas to the Virgin Islands, including St. Croix.

== Description ==
=== Vegetative characteristics ===
Nymphaea pulchella is an aquatic herb with cylindrical to subglobose tubers. The elliptic, suborbicular to orbicular leaves have a sinuate to dentate margin. The veins show minimal prominence on the abaxial leaf surface.

=== Generative characteristics ===
The diurnal flowers can extend up to 20 cm above the water surface. They are held up by glabrous, brownish, non-brittle peduncles with six primary central and 12-13 secondary peripheral air canals. The androecium consists of 43-80 stamens. The ellipsoid, smooth, hispid seeds have trichomes arranged in continuous longitudinal lines.

== Reproduction ==
=== Vegetative reproduction ===
Proliferating pseudanthia are absent.

=== Generative reproduction ===
It is autogamous, but reproduction is more fruitful in the presence of pollinators. Flowering and fruiting occurs throughout the year. Generative reproduction is the main mode of reproduction.

== Taxonomy ==
=== Publication ===
It was first described by Augustin Pyramus de Candolle in 1821.

=== Placement within Nymphaea ===
It is placed in Nymphaea subgenus Brachyceras.

== Etymology ==
The specific epithet pulchella means "beautiful" or "pretty".

== Conservation ==
In Puerto Rico, USA, it faces habitat destruction.

== Ecology ==
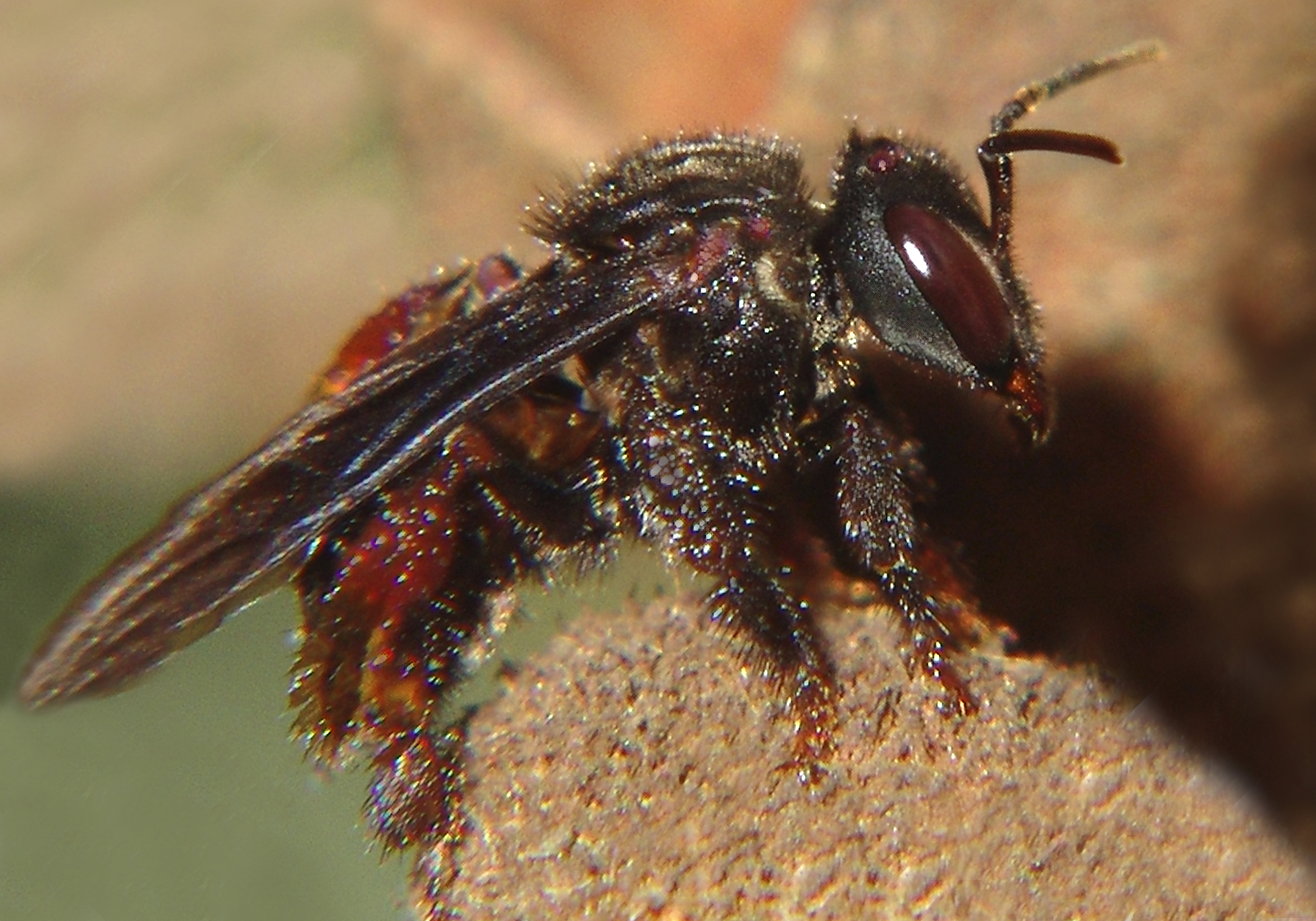
Trigona spinipes an effective pollinator of Nymphaea pulchella

=== Habitat ===
It occurs in freshwater habitats, such as lakes, ponds, lagoons, streams, and temporary puddles.

=== Pollination ===
The bee species Trigona spinipes is an effective pollinator of Nymphaea pulchella. In some cases, the bees coated in pollen fall into the stigmatic fluid and die. The flowers are also visited by the bee species Apis mellifera, as well as flies.

=== Herbivory ===
The bee species Trigona spinipes is florivorous, i.e. it consumes parts of the flowers of Nymphaea pulchella.
