= Acoma sexfoliata =

Scientific classification
- Kingdom: Animalia
- Phylum: Arthropoda
- Class: Insecta
- Order: Coleoptera
- Suborder: Polyphaga
- Infraorder: Scarabaeiformia
- Family: Scarabaeidae
- Genus: Acoma
- Species: A. sexfoliata

Binomial name
- Acoma sexfoliata Saylor, 1948

Species of beetle

Acoma sexfoliata is a species of beetles first described by Lawrence Webster Saylor in 1948. It is known from California, USA, and Baja California, Mexico.

Acoma sexfoliata measure 5.5–6.5 mm (0.22–0.26 in) in length.
