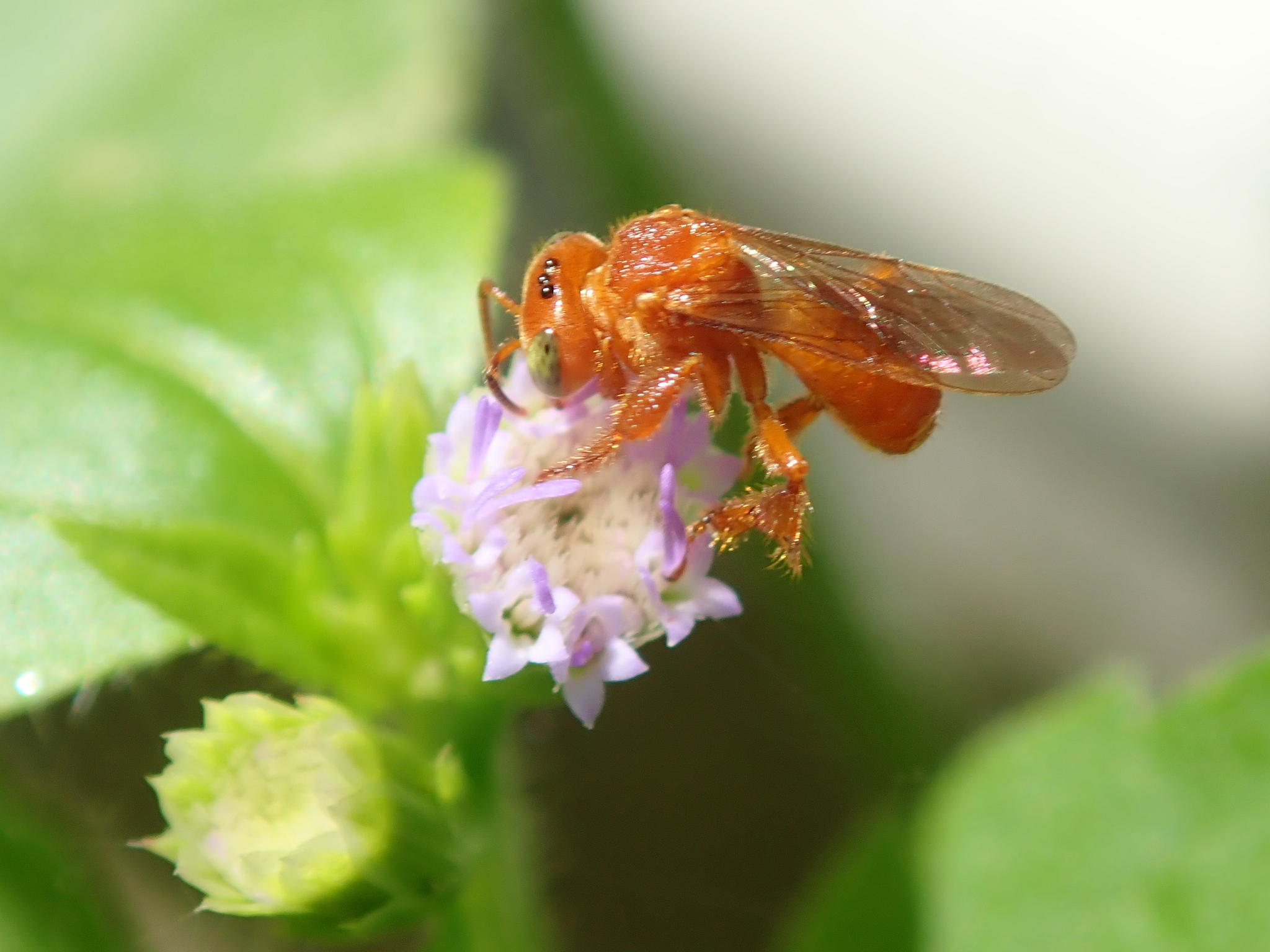

Scientific classification
- Kingdom: Animalia
- Phylum: Arthropoda
- Class: Insecta
- Order: Hymenoptera
- Family: Apidae
- Genus: Trigona
- Species: T. pallens

Binomial name
- Trigona pallens (Fabricius, 1798)

= Trigona pallens =

Species of bee

Trigona pallens, known as abelha-olho-de-vidro ("glass-eye bee") in Brazil, is a species of eusocial stingless bee in the family Apidae and tribe Meliponini.

== Habitat and nest ==
Nests are found in the ground, among roots, or at the base of tree trunks.

== Ecology ==
The Solanum stramoniifolium is a host plant for the Trigona pallens.
