= Trigona chanchamayoensis =

Scientific classification
- Domain: Eukaryota
- Kingdom: Animalia
- Phylum: Arthropoda
- Class: Insecta
- Order: Hymenoptera
- Family: Apidae
- Genus: Trigona
- Species: T. chanchamayoensis

Binomial name
- Trigona chanchamayoensis Schwarz, 1948

Species of bee

Trigona chanchamayoensis is a species of eusocial stingless bee in the family Apidae and tribe Meliponini.
