= Acoma brunnea =

Scientific classification
- Kingdom: Animalia
- Phylum: Arthropoda
- Class: Insecta
- Order: Coleoptera
- Suborder: Polyphaga
- Infraorder: Scarabaeiformia
- Family: Scarabaeidae
- Genus: Acoma
- Species: A. brunnea

Binomial name
- Acoma brunnea Casey, 1889

Species of beetle

Acoma brunnea is a species of scarab beetle in the family Scarabaeidae. It is found in Arizona, New Mexico, and Texas (United States).

Acoma brunnea measure 5.6–6 mm (0.22–0.24 in) in length.
