= Acoma mixta =

Scientific classification
- Kingdom: Animalia
- Phylum: Arthropoda
- Clade: Pancrustacea
- Class: Insecta
- Order: Coleoptera
- Suborder: Polyphaga
- Infraorder: Scarabaeiformia
- Family: Scarabaeidae
- Genus: Acoma
- Species: A. mixta

Binomial name
- Acoma mixta Howden, 1958

Species of beetle

Acoma mixta is a species of scarab beetle in the family Scarabaeidae. It is known from Arizona, USA.

Acoma mixta measure 4.8–7.5 mm (0.19–0.30 in) in length.
