= Acoma glabrata =

Scientific classification
- Kingdom: Animalia
- Phylum: Arthropoda
- Class: Insecta
- Order: Coleoptera
- Suborder: Polyphaga
- Infraorder: Scarabaeiformia
- Family: Scarabaeidae
- Genus: Acoma
- Species: A. glabrata

Binomial name
- Acoma glabrata Cazier, 1953

Synonyms
- Acoma nigrita Cazier, 1953

Species of beetle

Acoma glabrata is a species of scarab beetle in the family Scarabaeidae. It is known from California and Arizona, USA, and Baja California, Mexico.

Acoma glabrata measure 5.5–8.3 mm (0.22–0.33 in) in length.
