= Trigona branneri =

Scientific classification
- Kingdom: Animalia
- Phylum: Arthropoda
- Class: Insecta
- Order: Hymenoptera
- Family: Apidae
- Genus: Trigona
- Species: T. branneri

Binomial name
- Trigona branneri Cockerell, 1912

Species of bee

Trigona branneri is a species of eusocial stingless bee in the family Apidae and tribe Meliponini.

== See also ==
- Trigona spinipes
