= Acoma arizonica =

Scientific classification
- Kingdom: Animalia
- Phylum: Arthropoda
- Class: Insecta
- Order: Coleoptera
- Suborder: Polyphaga
- Infraorder: Scarabaeiformia
- Family: Scarabaeidae
- Genus: Acoma
- Species: A. arizonica

Binomial name
- Acoma arizonica Brown, 1929

Species of beetle

Acoma arizonica is a species of scarab beetle in the family Scarabaeidae. It is found in Arizona, the Southwestern United States.

Acoma arizonica measure 4.7–7.6 mm (0.19–0.30 in) in length.
