= Acoma knulli =

Scientific classification
- Kingdom: Animalia
- Phylum: Arthropoda
- Clade: Pancrustacea
- Class: Insecta
- Order: Coleoptera
- Suborder: Polyphaga
- Infraorder: Scarabaeiformia
- Family: Scarabaeidae
- Genus: Acoma
- Species: A. knulli

Binomial name
- Acoma knulli Howden, 1958

Species of beetle

Acoma knulli is a species of scarab beetle in the family Scarabaeidae. It is found in Arizona and New Mexico in the Southwestern United States. It is named for Josef Nissley Knull.

Acoma knulli measure 4.9–6.6 mm (0.19–0.26 in) in length.
