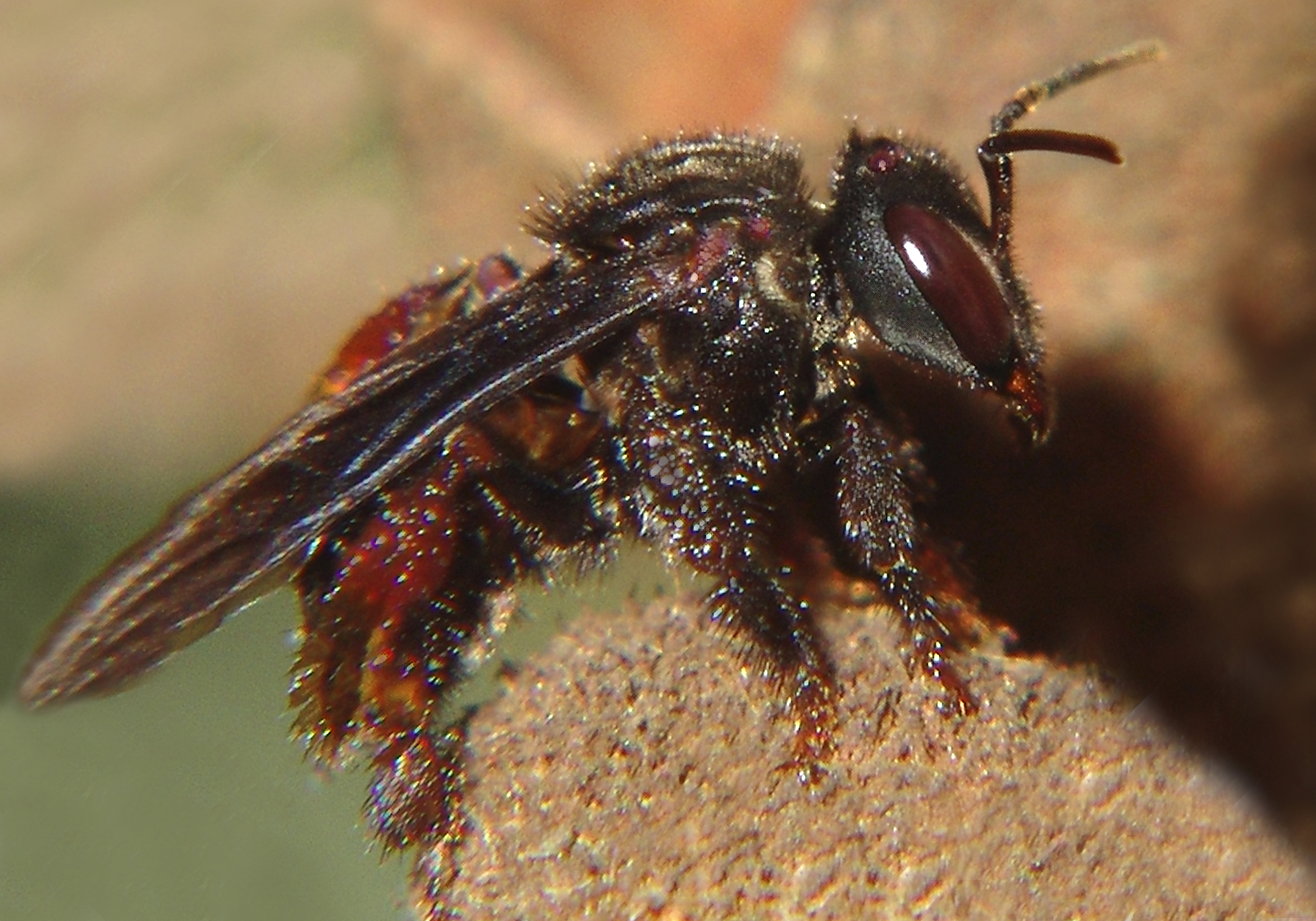

Scientific classification
- Kingdom: Animalia
- Phylum: Arthropoda
- Clade: Pancrustacea
- Class: Insecta
- Order: Hymenoptera
- Family: Apidae
- Genus: Trigona
- Species: T. spinipes

Binomial name
- Trigona spinipes (Fabricius, 1793)
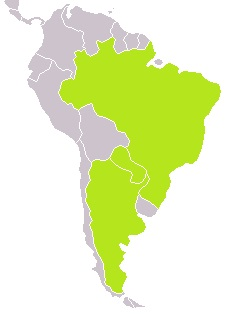
- Found in parts of Brazil, Argentina, and Paraguay

Synonyms
- Trigona ruficrus Latreille, 1804

= Trigona spinipes =

Species of bee

Trigona spinipes is a species of stingless bee. It occurs in Brazil, where it is called arapuá, aripuá, irapuá, japurá or abelha-cachorro ("dog-bee"). The species name means "spiny feet" in Latin. Trigona spinipes builds its nest on trees (or on buildings and other human structures), out of mud, resin, wax, and assorted debris, including dung. Therefore, its honey is not fit for consumption, even though it is reputed to be of good quality by itself, and is used in folk medicine. Colonies may have from 5,000 to over 100,000 workers.

T. spinipes will attack in swarms when they feel the nest is threatened. They cannot sting, and their bite is not very effective. Their main weapon against predatory animals, including human beings, is to entangle themselves in the victim's hair and buzz loudly. They will also aggressively penetrate human bodily openings such as nasal and auditory orifices when in attack mode.

T. spinipes uses odor trails, sometimes extending several hundred metres, in order to lead nestmates from the hive to a food source. Moreover, it can "eavesdrop" on chemical signals used by other bee species (such as carpenter bees, Africanized honeybees and other stingless bees) for the same purpose, killing them or driving them away to take over their food source.

The bee has been considered an agricultural pest for some crops, such as passion fruit, because it damages leaves and flowers while collecting nest materials, and tunnels through the unopened flowers to collect the nectar (thus frustrating their normal pollinators). On the other hand, they are significant pollinators on their own, e.g. for onions.

== Taxonomy and phylogeny ==
Trigona spinipes was described by Johan Christian Fabricius in 1793 but was known under Latreille's 1804 name Trigona ruficrus for many years; however, upon re-examination of a museum specimen, Jesus S. Moure determined that Trigona spinipes is the older name for the species. Trigona spinipes is in the order Hymenoptera, which includes bees, wasps, ants, and sawflies. More specifically it is from the bee family Apidae, which contains well known bee genera such as honeybees (Apis) and bumblebees (Bombus). It is from the tribe Meliponini, which comprises all of the genera of stingless bees. The genus Trigona contains some of the most populous species among the stingless bees.

== Description and identification ==
Trigona spinipes constructs large external nests in trees. Compared to other Trigona species such as T. hyalinata, T. spinipes nests are built quite high above the ground. They are usually built on forks between tree branches 4–7 meters from the ground and can be as large as 50–60 cm long and 50–60 cm wide. The nest material consists of mud, wax, plant fragments, and resins. The honeycombs within the nest contain the brood of eggs, larvae and pupae along within stores of honey and pollen. Early studies of T. spinipes nests noted the presence of a dense internal structure referred to as the “scutellum” which was often used to paralyze fish because of its high content of acetylcholine. This dense structure consists of nest waste such as adult bee excrements and its primary role is suggested to be an internal support upon which honeycombs are built. As for diet, Trigona spinipes has been known to collect pollen from a variety of plants, especially Eucalyptus spp., Aloe sp., and Archontophonix sp.

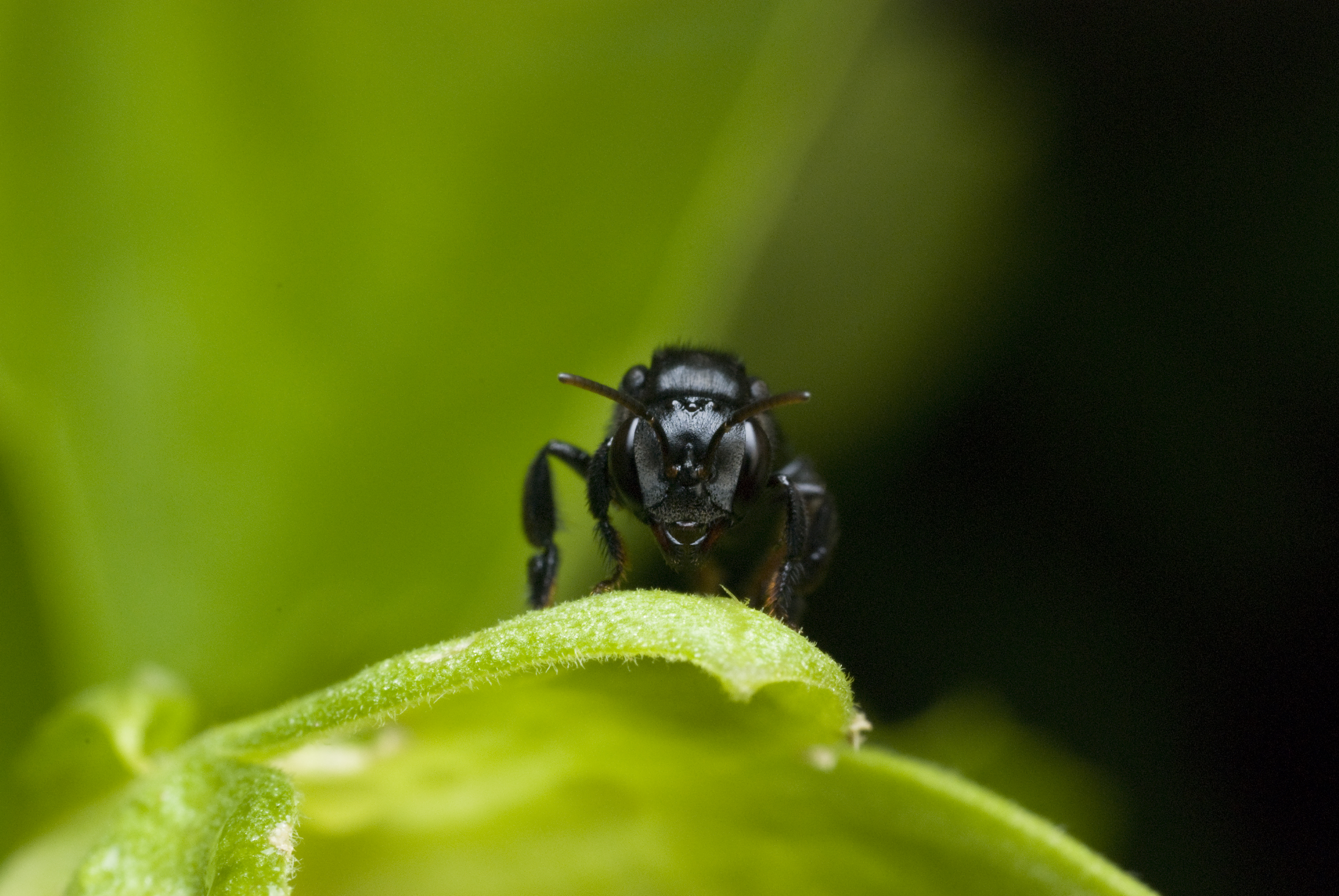

== Distribution and habitat ==
Trigona spinipes is quite common in large areas of Brazil as well as Paraguay, Argentina, and other parts of South America. It inhabits a variety of habitats including the cerrado (neotropical savannah), and tropical forests. Studies concerning Trigona spinipes have largely been conducted in Eastern and Southeastern Brazilian states such as São Paulo, Alagoas and Minas Gerais.

== Colony cycle ==
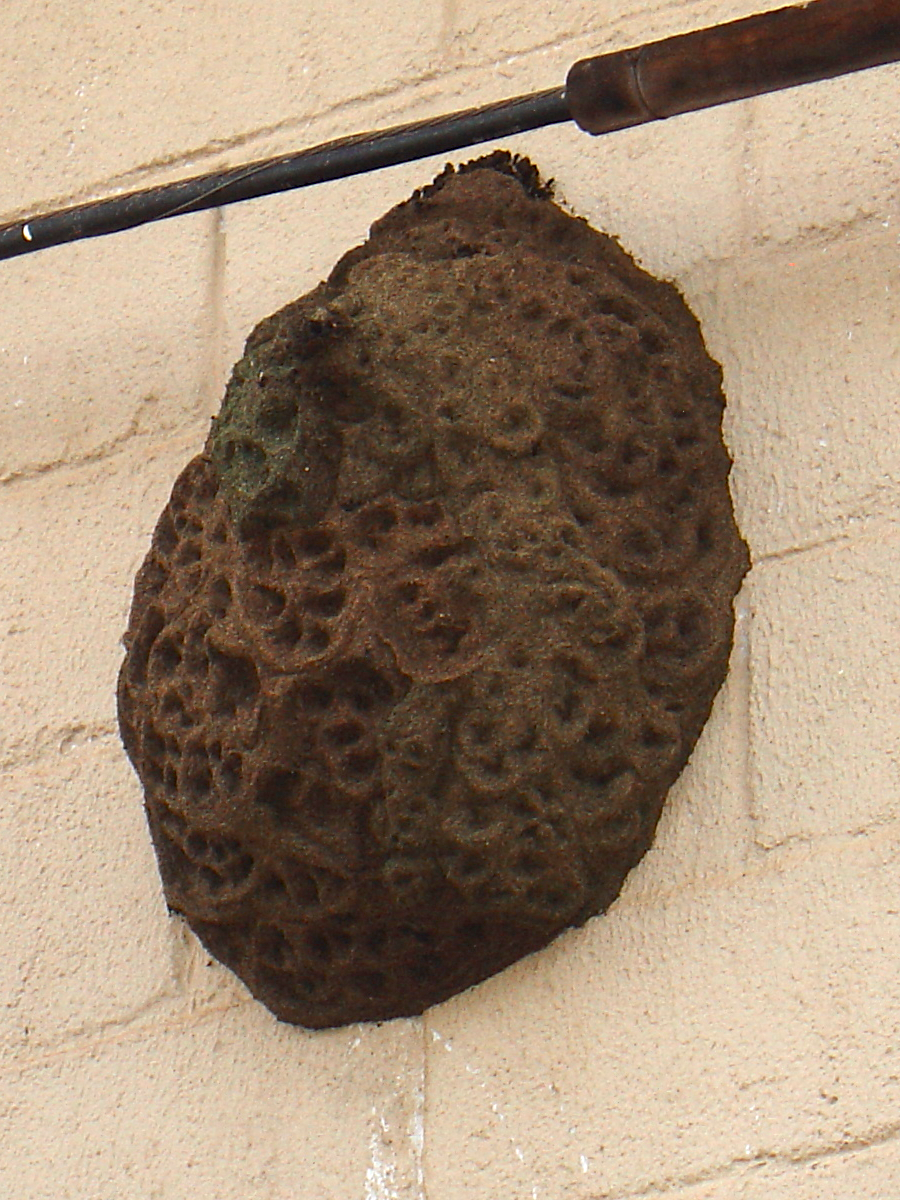
Nest of Trigona spinipes, a couple of months old. The cinder blocks are about 40 cm wide and 19 cm tall. The greenish part is the most recent addition. The light spots on the nest are individual bees.

For Trigona spinipes, the act of colony initiation is not tied to changes in seasons – which are minimal in the tropic regions that it resides – but rather new colonies emerge as needed. Like other Meliponini bees, new Trigona spinipes colonies begin with swarms. Virgin queens emerge from the nests where they were born and fly with swarms of female workers to a new nesting spot. Drawn by an odor emitting from the virgin queen colony, males aggregate outside of the new nesting spot waiting for the queen to emerge. The queen then flies out for a single mating and returns to the nest.

Within 6 months, a nest can reach full physical size. In terms of number of bees, Trigona spinipes form some of the largest stingless bee colonies in the world, ranging in size from 5,000 to over 100,000 workers. Some colonies can reach 180,000 individuals, which is one order of magnitude larger than the size of honey bee colonies. The nests are perennial.

== Behavior ==
=== Polarized odor-trail communication ===
Like all other stingless bees, Trigona spinipes is highly social. When foraging, the workers utilize polarized odor-trail communication to relay the locations of food sources to each other. Unlike classic pheromone trails which extend from the food source to the nest, these polarized pheromone signals are short and do not reach the nest. They likely evolved to be short so as to not lead eavesdropping predators back to their nest. What makes these trails polarized is that they are strongest at the food source and taper off moving away from it. This allows other bees following the signal to arrive at the food in large numbers without wasting time looking for food along the trail. Octyl octanoate is the most significant component of the trail pheromone. It is emitted from the cephalic labial glands of Trigona spinipes and makes up approximately 74% of the secretion. Studies found synthetically produced octyl octanoate to be equally attractive to natural extract derived from the labial glands of foragers.

=== Male mating behavior ===
Because Trigona spinipes queens only mate once in their lifetimes, there is tremendous competition between males to copulate with virgin queens. Usually 30–50 but sometimes even hundreds of males can be counted near virgin queen colonies in lek-like groups. The males come from great distances and from a variety of nests. There is a very low probability that a male will ever mate. They stay inside the colony until the age of 2–3 weeks and then leave the nest and live the life of a solitary male bee, which might be 4–6 weeks. While living alone, they will forage with conspecific workers and may follow these workers back to their nests to learn the locations of conspecific nests.

=== Communication ===
While Trigona spinipes workers follow their nest-mates pheromone trails to food resources, they have been shown to follow scent marks left by another stingless bee Melipona rufiventris. They do this when they are foraging for new sources of food. Afterwards, Trigona spinipes will attack foraging Melipona rufiventris bees and take over their food. Some hypothesize that honey bee dance evolved to prevent eavesdropping espionage of this sort.

The pheromone signal laid down by Trigona spinipes have been found, surprisingly, to be a deterrent to the more dominant stingless bee species Trigona hyalinata. The reason for this is not clear, but it is hypothesized that the dominant specie wants to avoid costs and injuries associated with seizing a food source from Trigona spinipes rather than finding its own source. Trigona hyalinata are attracted to food sources with fewer Trigona spinipes foragers, because they can easily overpower a small number of their competitors.

=== Aggression ===
Trigona spinipes is locally known for its aggressiveness. Despite lacking the ability to sting, workers will pursue intruders and bite them. Each of their two mandibles have 5 sharp teeth. A study found that among 12 stingless bees investigated, Trigona spinipes was one of the 6 species that engaged in suicidal biting. The phenomenon of suicidal biting involved workers biting a target intruder so tenaciously that a significant number of the workers suffered fatal injuries. Of the 6 bees which engaged in suicidal biting, Trigona spinipes displayed the most aggressive behavior overall.

== Kin selection ==
=== Sex and caste determination ===
Sex in Trigona spinipes is determined by whether or not the eggs are fertilized. Fertilized eggs are diploid and become females while unfertilized eggs are haploid and become males. Caste determination is trophic, meaning that it is not hereditary, but rather depends on the quantity and quality of food consumed by larvae. Female larvae which consume better and higher quality food develop 12 rather than the usual 4 ovarioles at the pupal stage which later develop into queens. This trophic caste determination is the reason that Trigona spinipes queens are larger than workers. There is no size difference between queens and workers in other Meliponini species which utilize trophogenic caste determination mechanisms. Virgin queens pose a threat to established queens. They are usually not needed by the colony so they are usually either killed by workers or imprisoned.

=== Workers laying eggs ===
Although they are smaller and have fewer ovarioles than queens, workers retain the ability to lay viable eggs. This ability is somewhat limited. Workers which are in close proximity to the queen often lay trophic or sterile eggs presumably due to hormone signals from the queen. In addition, the queen caste routinely consumes eggs laid by workers.

=== Lack of polyandry ===
Unlike what might be expected for such large colonies, there is no polyandry or polygyny in Trigona spinipes, such as can be found in honeybees. The sperm limitation hypothesis for the evolution of polyandry postulates that polyandry – the behavior of a queen mating with multiple males – evolved partly as a way for the queen to obtain enough sperm to fertilize her eggs. A positive correlation has been found between polyandry and colony size across a variety of insects including ants, bees, and wasps. Polyandry also has the advantage of promoting genetic diversity in large colonies, which promotes disease resistance, as has been shown in other bee species that are usually monandrous. As such, since Trigona spinipes are not polyandrous, the mechanisms by which they promote genetic diversity are not clear.

=== Worker–queen conflict ===
The fact that Trigona spinipes colonies are headed by singly mated queens leads to conflict between workers and the queen over male production. Workers have the ability to lay unfertilized haploid eggs which will develop into males. Kin selection argues that it is in the workers favor to do this. This is because each worker is more related to her own sons (relatedness=0.5) than to the queen's sons (relatedness=0.25). In bee species such as honeybees, which are headed by polyandrous queens workers, workers are more related to the queen's sons (relatedness=0.25) than they are to each other's sons (relatedness = 0.125), so they consume each other's sons in a phenomenon known as worker policing. However, this is not the case in Trigona spinipes. There is ongoing conflict between queens and workers over egg laying with eggs constantly being consumed. This conflict may explain why Trigona spinipes, unlike honeybees, lay male and female eggs in identical cells. This makes it more difficult for workers to determine where the queen's male eggs are located.

== Ecology ==
=== Pollination ecology ===
It is an effective pollinator of Nymphaea pulchella. In some cases, the bees coated in pollen fall into the stigmatic fluid and die.

== Human importance ==
Trigona spinipes serves as major pollinators of tropical plants, it pollinates a broad variety of species across South America and is considered the ecological equivalent of the honey bee. However, Trigona spinipes has also been found to damage a variety of food crops while collecting nest materials. It has been shown to damage the fruits and flowers of rabbiteye blueberry plants, scarify the fruits of passion fruit, and damage broccoli floral stems.
