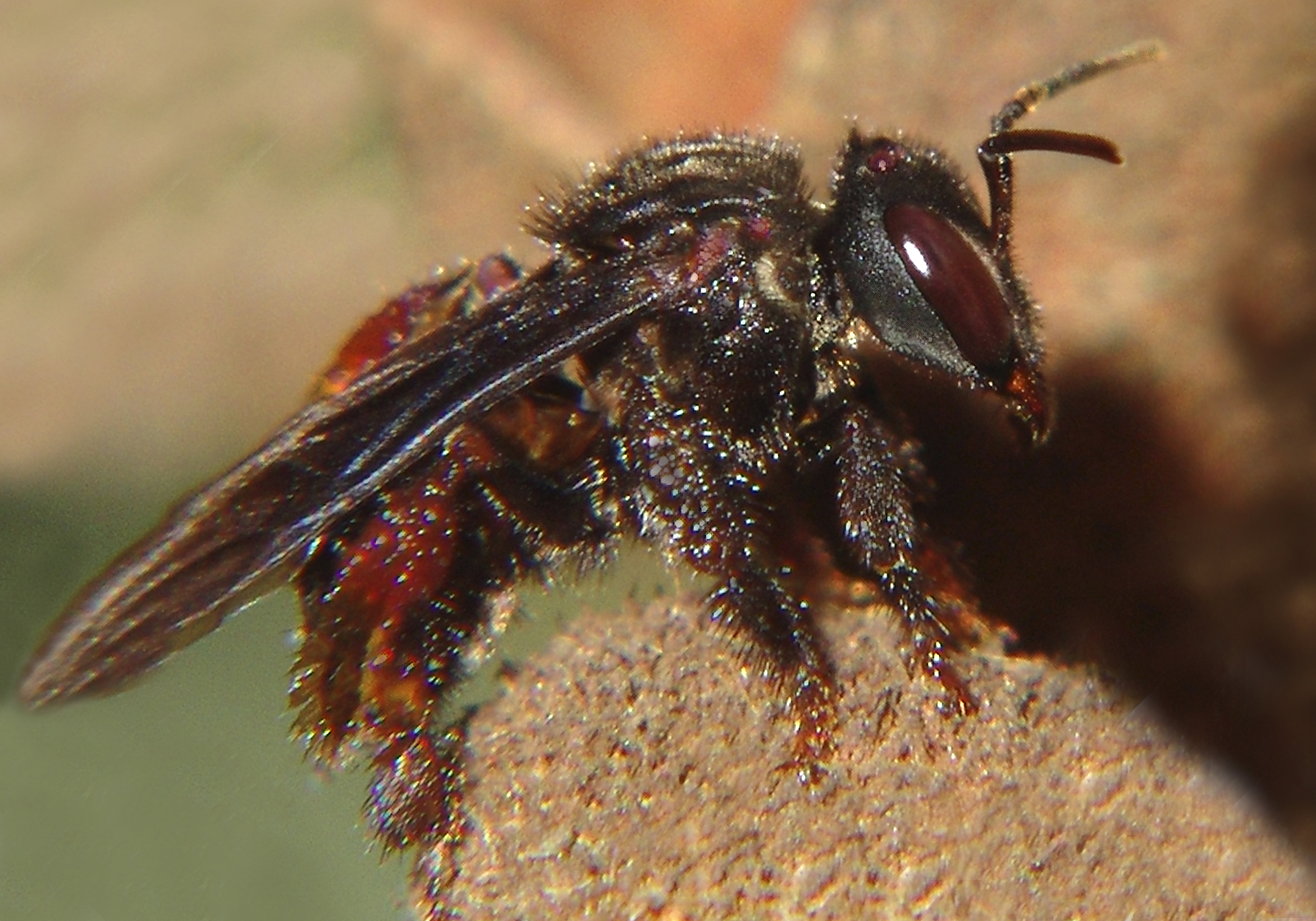
- Trigona spinipes

Scientific classification
- Kingdom: Animalia
- Phylum: Arthropoda
- Clade: Pancrustacea
- Class: Insecta
- Order: Hymenoptera
- Family: Apidae
- Tribe: Meliponini
- Genus: Trigona; Jurine, 1807

Subgenera
- Duckeola; Frieseomelitta; Geotrigona; Tetragona; Tetragonisca; Trigona

= Trigona =

Genus of bees

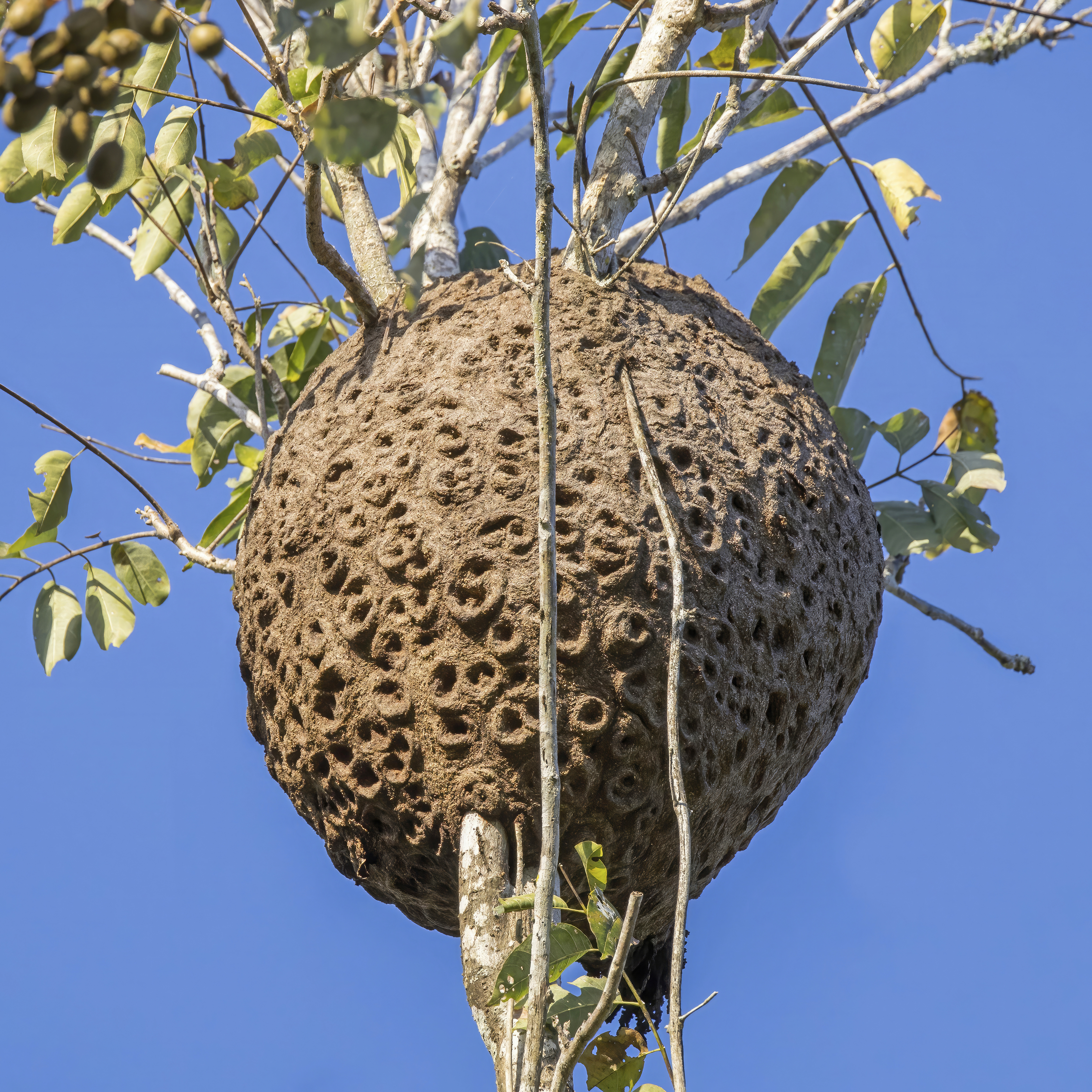
Arboreal nest in Guatemala

Trigona is one of the largest genera of stingless bees, comprising about 32 species, exclusively occurring in the New World, and formerly including many more subgenera than the present assemblage; many of these former subgenera have been elevated to generic status.

== Range ==
Trigona species occur throughout the Neotropical region, including South and Central America, the Mexican lowlands, and the Caribbean islands. They can occur in forests, savannas, and man made environments. Trigona bees are active all year round, although they are less active in cool environments.

== Nesting ==
Trigona nests are constructed from wax they produce and plant resins they collect. They usually nest in tree cavities and underground.

== Vulture bees ==
Vulture bees comprise three Trigona species, and are the only bees known to be scavengers. These bees collect and feed on dead animal flesh.

== Communication ==
Some species of Trigona bees use saliva to lay scent trails guiding nest mates to a food source. Some species of Trigona use eavesdropping which help them detect food sources being exploited by competitors.

== Selected species ==
- Trigona branneri—Mato Grosso (Brazil)
- Trigona chanchamayoensis—Mato Grosso (Brazil)
- Trigona cilipes—Americas
- Trigona corvina - Central and South America
- Trigona crassipes (Fabricius, 1793)
- Trigona ferricauda—Americas
- Trigona fulviventris—Mexico to Colombia
- Trigona fuscipennis—Mexico to Brasil.
- Trigona hyalinata—Mato Grosso (Brazil)
- Trigona hypogea (Silvestri, 1902)
- Trigona necrophaga (Camargo & Roubik, 1991)
- Trigona nigerrima—Americas (Mexico, Costa Rica)
- Trigona nigra—Mexico
- Trigona pallens—Americas
- Trigona recursa—Mato Grosso (Brazil)
- Trigona silvestriana—Americas (Costa Rica)
- Trigona spinipes—arapuá (Brazil)
