= Mandible (insect mouthpart) =

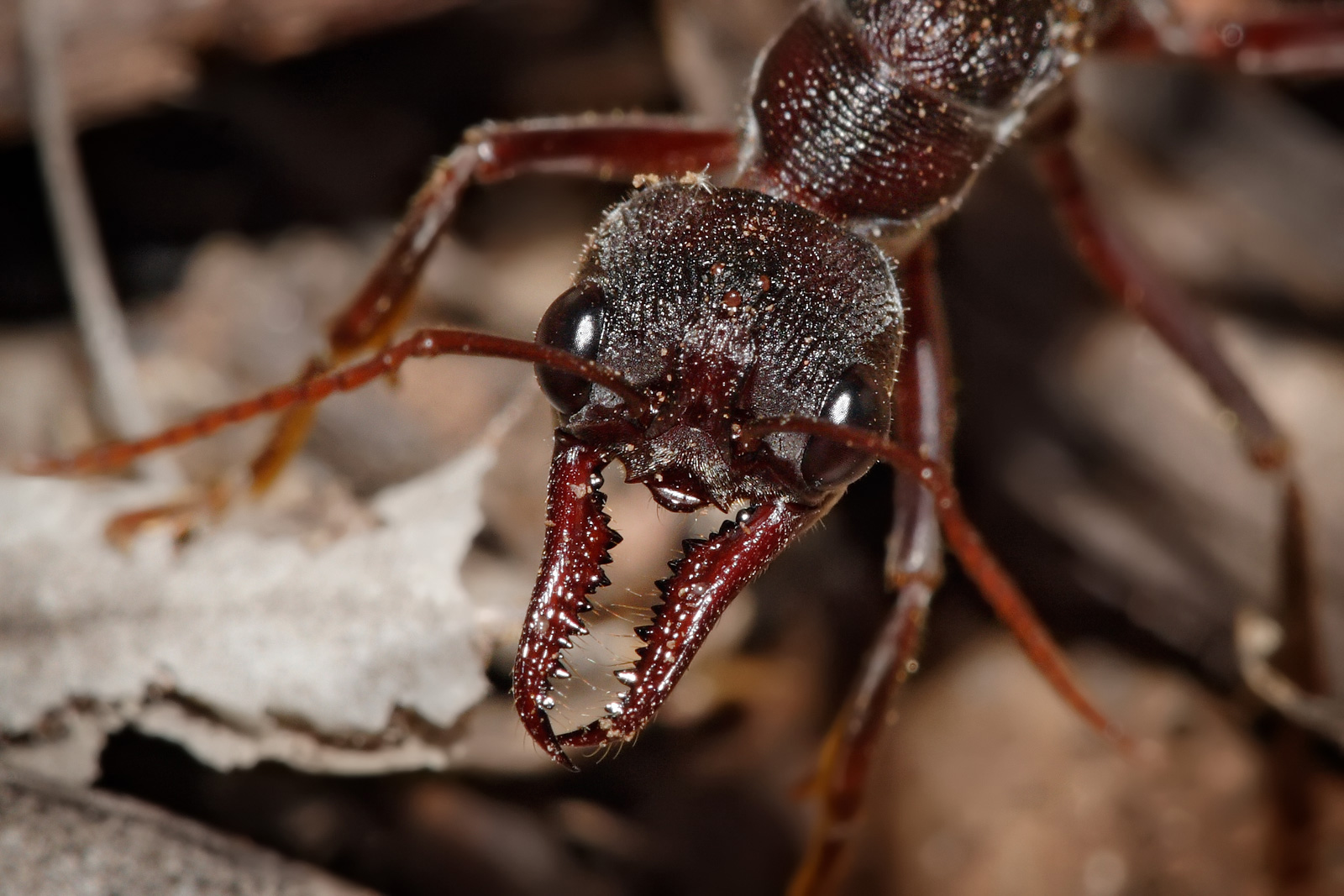
The mandibles of a bull ant

Insect mandibles are a pair of appendages near the insect's mouth, and the most anterior of the three pairs of oral appendages (the labrum is more anterior, but is a single fused structure). Their function is typically to grasp, crush, or cut the insect's food, or to defend against predators or rivals. Insect mandibles, which appear to be evolutionarily derived from legs, move in the horizontal plane unlike those of vertebrates, which appear to be derived from gill arches and move vertically.

== Grasshoppers, crickets, and other simple insects ==
The mouthparts of orthopteran insects are often used as a basic example of mandibulate (chewing) mouthparts, and the mandibles themselves are likewise generalized in structure. They are large and hardened, shaped like pinchers, with cutting surfaces on the distal portion and chewing or grinding surfaces basally. They are usually lined with teeth and move sideways. Large pieces of leaves can therefore be cut and then pulverized near the mouth opening. The specific derived morphology of the teeth on the mandible varies depending on whether the insect eats broad-leafed herbs or grasses. This same simple structure is seen in all of the remaining Polyneopteran insect orders, with the exception of the Paraneoptera (Hemiptera, Thysanoptera, and Phthiraptera).

The mandibles of adult and larval Odonata appear simple and generalized, although there are typically six or seven mandibular muscles. Ephemeroptera rarely feed as adults, though the nymphs have simple mandibles.

== True bugs ==
The Hemiptera, and other insects whose mouthparts are described as piercing-sucking, have modified mandibles. Rather than being tooth-like, the mandibles of such insects are lengthened into stylets, which form the outer two parts of the feeding tube, or beak. The mandibles are therefore instrumental in piercing the plant or animal tissues upon which these insects feed, and in helping draw up fluids to the insect's mouth.

== Beetles ==
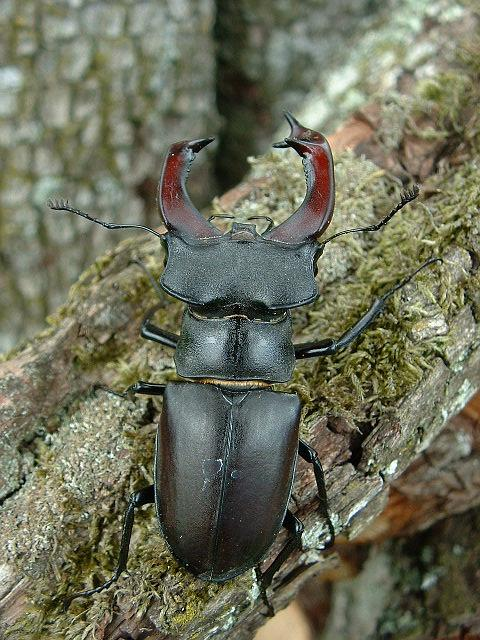
Stag beetle with mandibles modified no longer used in feeding

Nearly all adult beetles, and many beetle larvae, have mandibles. In general form they are similar to those of grasshoppers: hardened and tooth-like.

Beetle mandibles show a remarkable amount of variability between species, and some are very highly adapted to the food sources or other uses that the species has for them. Certain firefly larvae (family Lampyridae) that feed on snails have grooved mandibles that not only physically break down their prey, but also deliver digestive fluids by these grooves. Ground beetles (family Carabidae) of the tribe Cychrini have long mandibles that project far in front of them, which aid them in feeding on snails inside their shells.

Members of the stag beetle family (Lucanidae) have greatly enlarged mandibles that are often forked, resembling the horns of various deer, from which their common name comes, and similar modifications appear in various scarab beetles and longhorn beetles. Males of these beetles use their mandibles to grasp or displace each other as they compete for mates.

== Lice ==
The mandibles in Phthiraptera (lice) are also modified into piercing stylets.

== Thrips ==
Thysanoptera (thrips) have a variation of piercing mouthparts. During development they lose one mandible, so only the left mandible is present, modified into a stylet.

== Neuropteroids ==
Within the Neuropterida, adults have chewing mouthparts, but the mandibles of male dobsonflies are non-functional in feeding. The larvae in many lineages are predatory, with mandibles modified with grooves along which digestive saliva flows, while the larvae of the family Sisyridae have the mouthparts developed into a sucking tube which they use to feed on the liquid tissues of freshwater sponges.

== Ants, bees, and wasps ==
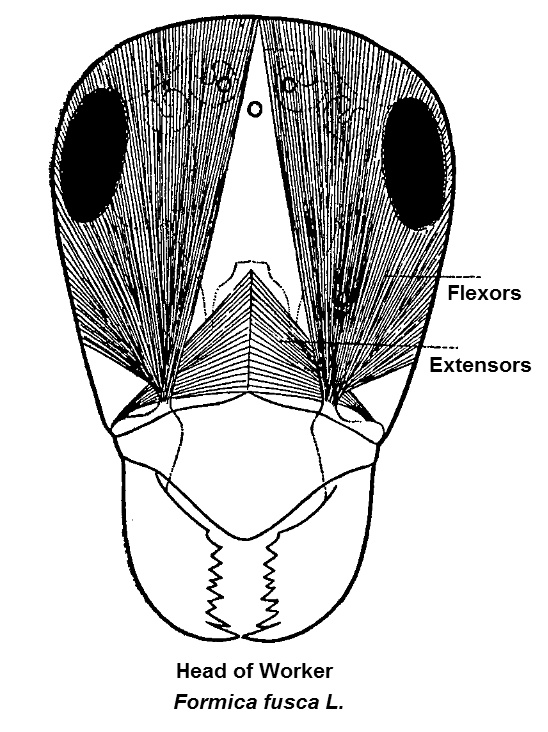
Musculature of ant mandibles

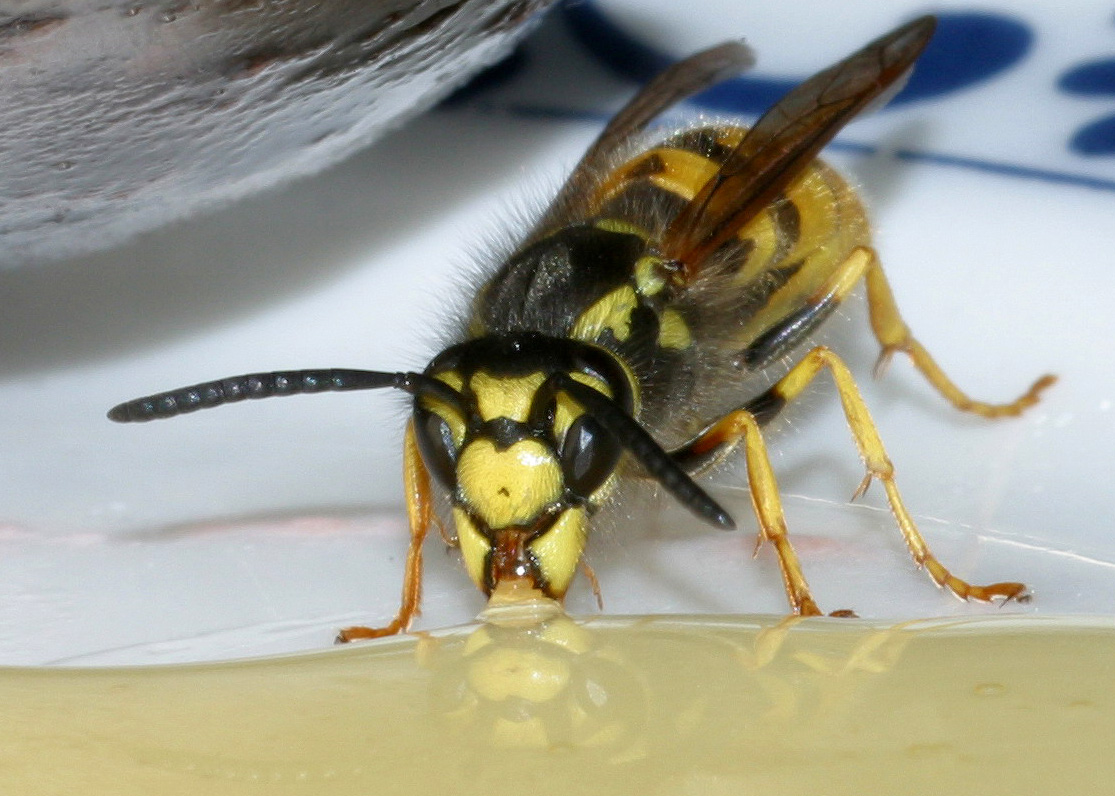
Wasp drinking; the yellow mandibles can be seen on either side of the mouthparts

Most adult Hymenoptera have mandibles that follow the general form, as in grasshoppers. The mandibles are used to clip pieces of vegetation, gather wood fibers, dig nests, or to capture and disassemble prey. What is unusual is that many Hymenoptera have the remaining mouthparts modified to form a proboscis (a "tongue" used to feed on liquids), making them virtually the only insects that normally possess both chewing mouthparts and sucking mouthparts (a few exceptional members of other orders may exhibit this, such as flower-feeding beetles that also have "tongues").

Trigona corvina, and other stingless bees, utilize their mandibles for defense purposes and typically interlock them with other individuals while fighting for resources.

== Flies ==
Several families of flies, notably mosquitoes (family Culicidae), have mandibles that are modified into stylets for piercing, similar to the true bugs.

Flies of the Muscomorpha, including the house fly, Musca domestica, stable fly, Stomoxys calcitrans, blow flies (family Calliphoridae), and many others, lack mandibles altogether, and the mouthparts are designed for sponging up liquids.

== Butterflies and moths ==
All but a few adult Lepidoptera lack mandibles, with the remaining mouthparts forming an elongated sucking tube. The exception is the mandibulate moths (family Micropterigidae), which have fully developed mandibles as adults.

== See also ==
- Insect mouthparts
- Yellow jacket
- Grasshopper
