= Scavenger =

Animal that feeds on carrion, dead plants, or refuse

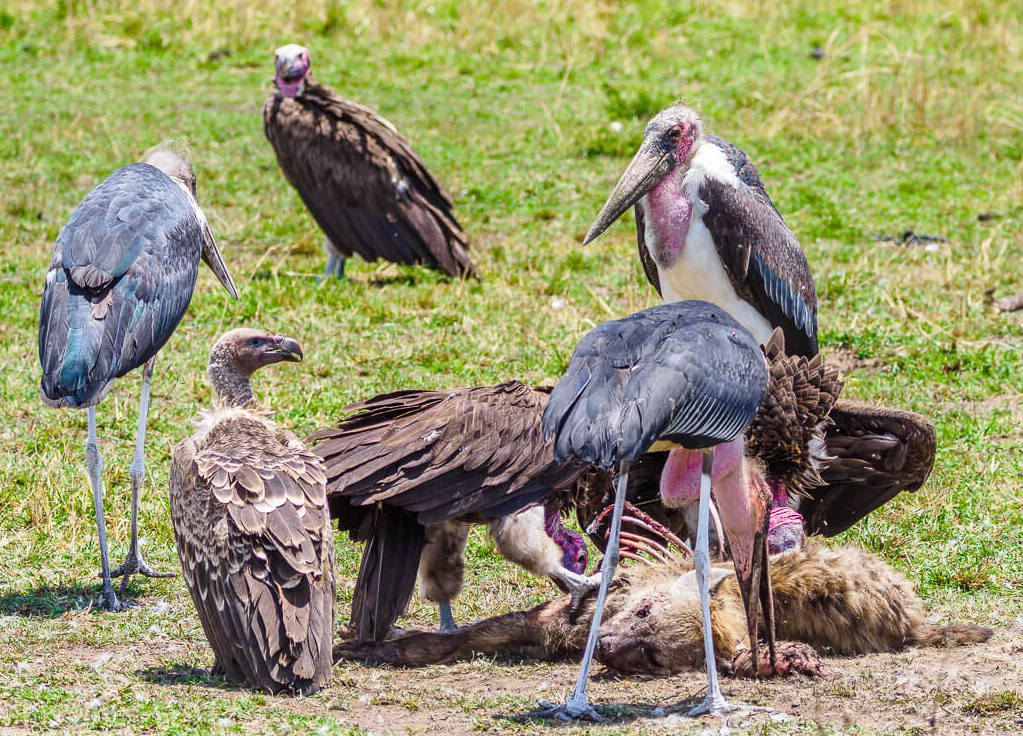
White-backed vulture (Gyps africanus), lappet-faced vultures (Torgos tracheliotos) and marabou storks (Leptoptilos crumenifer) feeding on hyena carrion

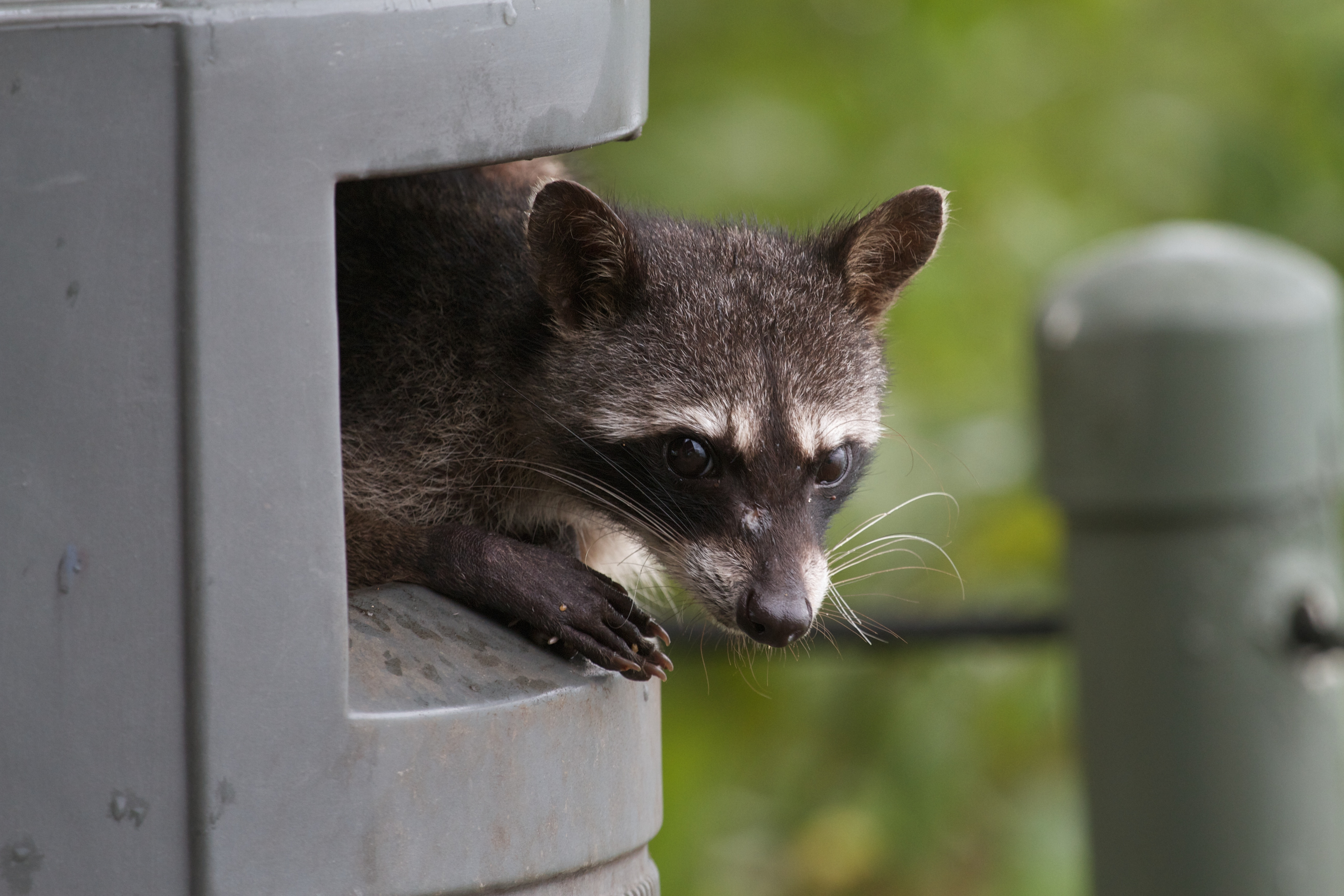
A crab-eating raccoon (Procyon cancrivorus) scavenging in trash for food

Scavengers are animals that feed on dead and decaying organic matter. Often the term is used to describe the consumption of carrion, the bodies of animals that have died from causes other than predation or the bodies of animals that have been killed by other predators. However, the term is also used to describe animals that feed on rotting plant matter or refuse.

Vultures and burying beetles are examples of scavengers that feed on carrion, pink bud moth and stag beetle larvae are examples of scavengers that feed on rotting plant matter, and raccoons and squirrels are examples of scavengers that feed on refuse. Carrion-eating scavengers are called necrophages.

Scavengers play an important role in ecosystems by preventing the accumulation of decaying matter and helping to recycle nutrients. The process and rate at which dead plant and animal material is scavenged is affected by both biotic and abiotic factors, such as plant species, carcass size, habitat, temperature, moisture levels, and seasons. Detritivores and decomposers complete this process by consuming the remains left by scavengers.

== Etymology ==
Scavenger is an alteration of scavager, from Middle English skawager meaning "customs collector", from skawage meaning "customs", from Old North French escauwage meaning "inspection", from schauwer meaning "to inspect", of Germanic origin; akin to Old English scēawian and German schauen meaning "to look at", and modern English "show" (with semantic drift).

== Related terminology ==
Animals that subsist entirely or mainly on decaying biomass (e.g. dead animals, dead plants) are called obligate scavengers, while those capable of obtaining food via other methods are termed facultative scavengers. Animals that rely specifically on carrion as a food source are called obligate necrophages. Animals that feed on particulate plant or animal matter (e.g. humus, marine snow) are typically categorized as detritivores rather than scavengers. The midge fly Propsilocerus akamusi, which feeds on detritus in the sediment of freshwater lakes, is an example of a detritivore.

== Types of scavengers ==
=== Scavengers that feed on carrion ===
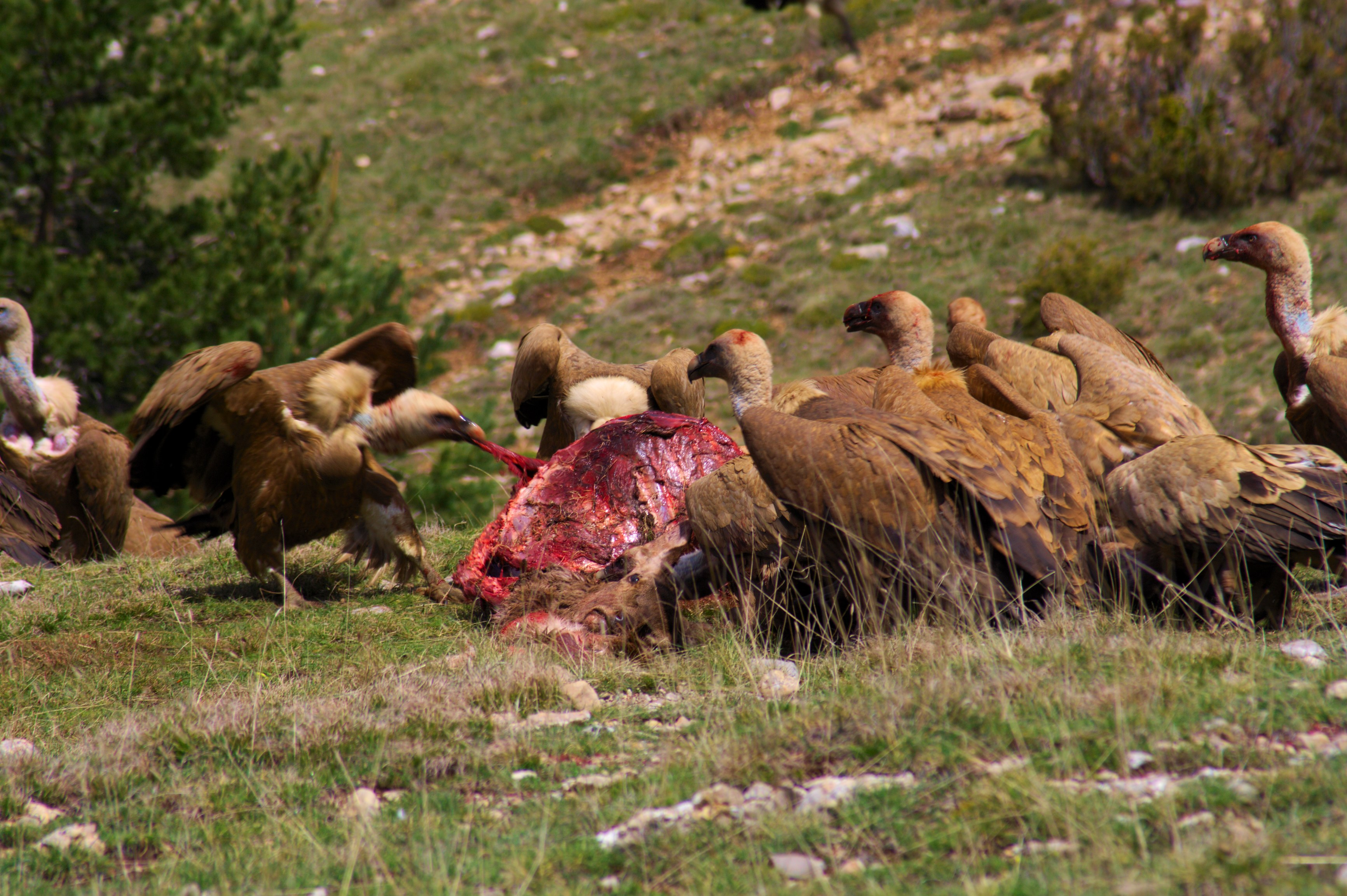
Griffon vultures (Gyps fulvus) eating the carcass of a red deer in Spain

Obligate scavenging of carrion (obligate necrophagy) is rare among vertebrates, due to the difficulty of finding enough carrion without expending too much energy. New World vultures such as the black vulture, and Old World vultures such as the griffon vulture, white-backed vulture and lappet-faced vulture, are examples of obligate carrion scavengers.

Most of the vertebrates that eat carrion are facultative scavengers, capable of obtaining food via predation or other methods, and eating carrion opportunistically. Many large carnivores that hunt regularly, such as hyenas and jackals, but also animals rarely thought of as scavengers, such as African lions, leopards, and wolves will scavenge if given the chance. They may also use their size and ferocity to intimidate the original hunters into abandoning their kills (the cheetah is a notable victim, rather than a perpetrator). Gulls, crows and magpies frequently scavenge roadkill. Other vertebrates, for example Egyptian mastigures, scavenge to survive during times of food scarcity.

Aquatic and semi-aquatic vertebrates feed on carrion too. Carrion-eating scavengers found in marine settings include hagfish, great white sharks, northern wolffish and abyssal grenadiers, and carrion-eating scavengers found in freshwater settings include American alligators, Eurasian otters and common midwife toads.

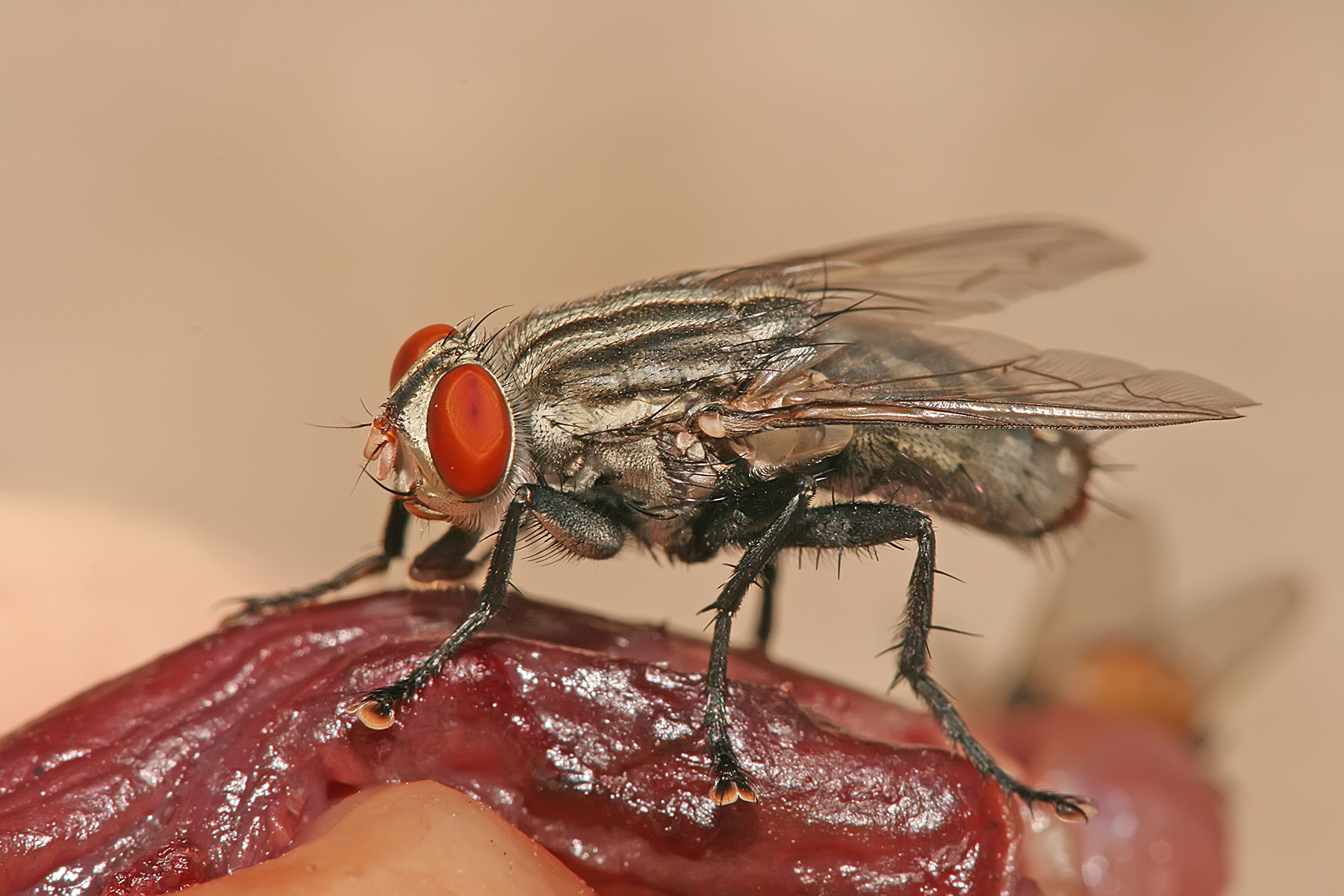
Sarcophaga nodosa, a species of flesh fly, feeding on decaying meat

Burying beetles, vulture bees and bone skipper flies are examples of obligately necrophagous invertebrates. They are all dependent on carrion during the larval stages of their life cycles. Adult burying beetles and vulture bees feed on carrion too. Other invertebrates, such as blow flies, flesh flies and yellowjackets, also feed on carrion but are not reliant on it for survival. Blow fly and flesh fly larvae can feed on excrement, and some species, for example, Chrysomya putoria and Sarcophaga crassipalpis, can feed on living tissue. Also, yellowjackets can hunt caterpillars and other insects and feed on nectar, sap and fruit.

In addition to the terrestrial examples above, many aquatic invertebrates consume carrion. The common octopus, European green crab and seven-armed starfish are all marine invertebrates that feed on carrion, and the ribbon leech Erpobdella obscura and red swamp crayfish are freshwater invertebrates that feed on carrion.

Carrion-eating scavengers have numerous adaptations to help them find food (e.g. excellent eyesight and hearing, strong sense of smell), protect themselves from infection and intoxication (e.g. strong immune systems, toxin-resistant physiologies), gorge themselves when food is available (e.g. expandable intestines), and conserve energy between meals (e.g. gliding flight).

=== Scavengers that feed on dead plants ===
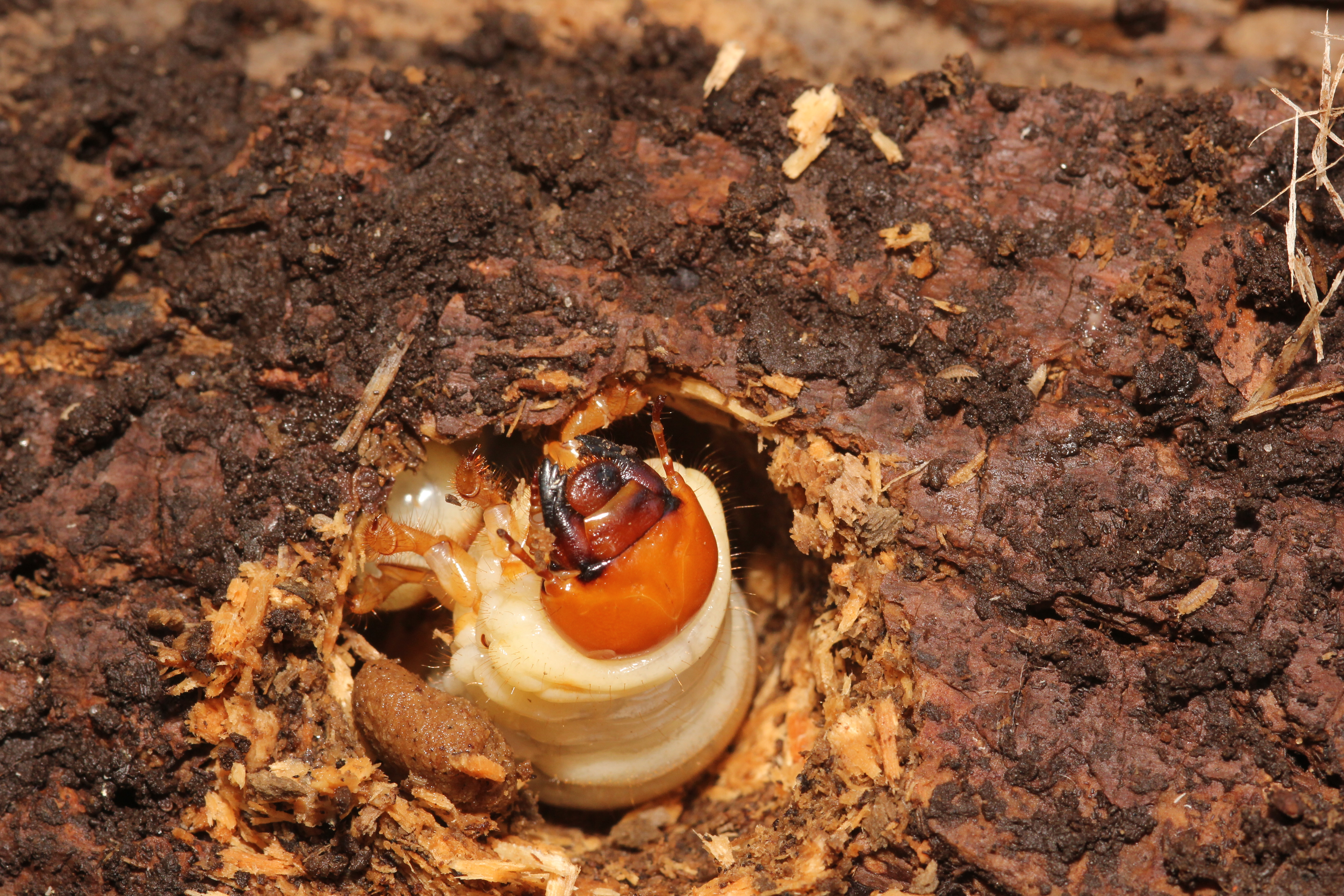
The stag beetle, Lucanus cervus, feeding on dead wood during the larval stage of its life cycle

Animals that feed on dead plant material are called herbivorous scavengers.

Some stag beetles are obligate scavengers of dead plant material. For example, Lucanus cervus is dependent on dead wood during the larval stages of its life cycle. Adult Lucanus cervus beetles lay their eggs near the stumps of dead trees, and the larvae then spend the next 4 to 7 years feeding and growing in size. Types of wood eaten include oak, ash, elm, sycamore, lime and hornbeam.

Pink bud moth larvae (also known as pink scavenger caterpillars) are facultative scavengers of dead plant material, feeding on rotting fruits, decaying flowers and leaves, but also the fruits and grains of live plants. Termites are facultative scavengers too. Termites feed on dead trees and wood, but also live plants and detritus such as humus and excrement. Darkling beetles (tenebrionids), woodlice, and banana moth larvae are also facultative scavengers of dead plant material.

=== Scavengers that feed on discarded food ===
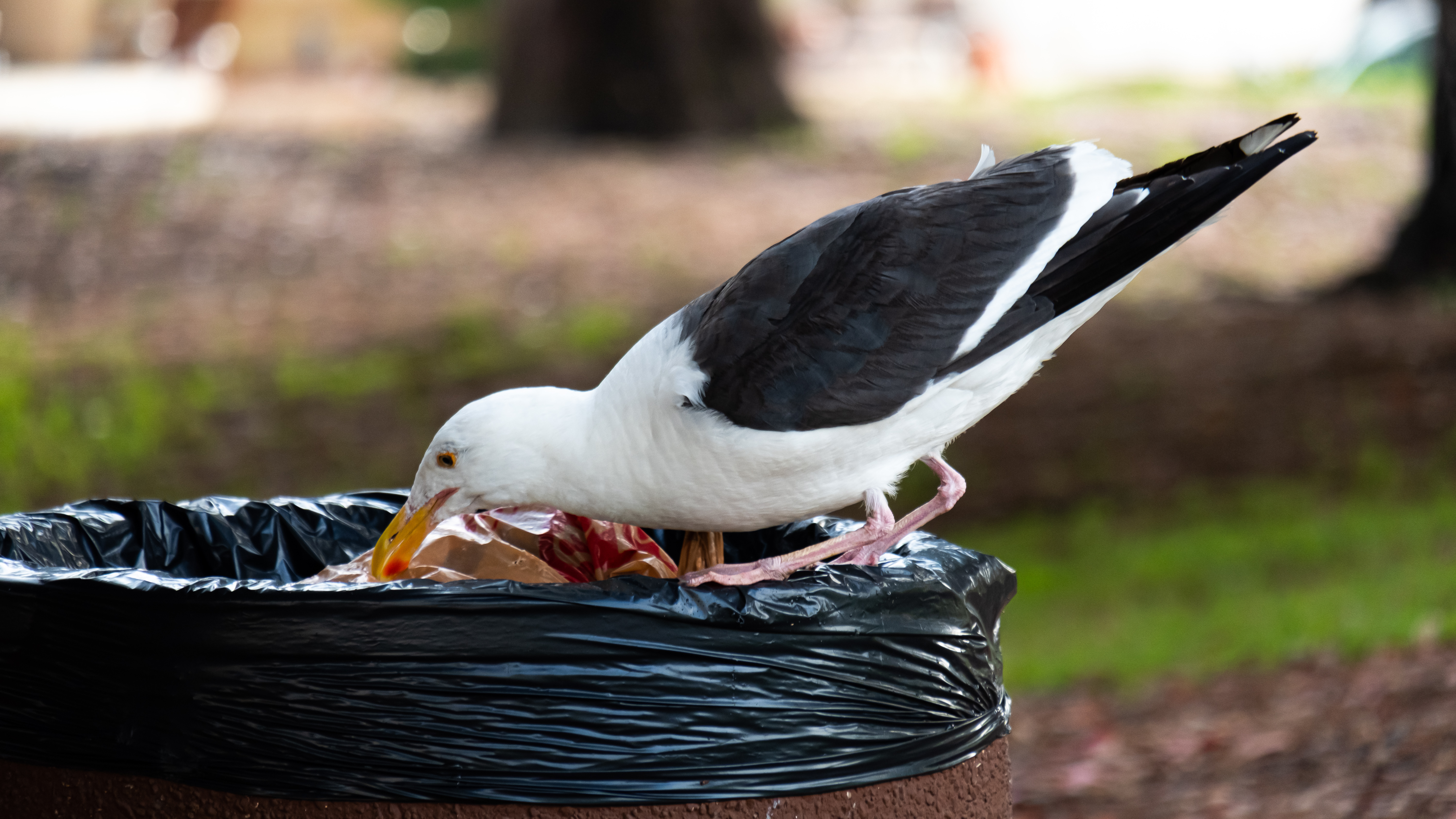
An urban gull scavenging in a garbage can for food

In urban settings, some animals regularly explore public parks and garbage cans for discarded food items that they can eat. This type of scavenger is sometimes called a refuse eater. Vertebrate examples include gulls, crows, feral pigeons, raccoons, baboons, opossums, brown rats, and squirrels. Invertebrate examples include ants and blow flies. In areas where there are municipal dumps, polar bears, elephants, raccoon dogs, red foxes, martens and polecats sometimes scavenge for food. Hyenas also scavenge from municipal dumps in some prey-depleted districts of East Africa.

The type of refuse eaten may be of plant origin (e.g. fruits, vegetables, leaves), animal origin (e.g. slaughterhouse discards), or it may be prepared food (e.g. cooked rice, bakery items).

== Prehistoric scavengers ==
In the prehistoric eras, the species Tyrannosaurus rex may have been an apex predator, preying upon hadrosaurs, ceratopsians, and possibly juvenile sauropods, although some experts have suggested the dinosaur was primarily a scavenger. The debate about whether Tyrannosaurus was an apex predator or scavenger was among the longest ongoing feuds in paleontology; however, most scientists now agree that Tyrannosaurus was an opportunistic carnivore, acting mostly as a predator but also scavenging when it could sense it. Recent research also shows that while an adult T. rex would energetically gain little through scavenging, smaller theropods of approximately 500 kg (1,100 lb) might have gained levels similar to those of hyenas, though not enough for them to rely on scavenging.

== Ecological function ==
Scavengers play a fundamental role in the environment through the removal of decaying organisms, serving as a natural sanitation service. While microscopic and invertebrate decomposers break down dead organisms into simple organic matter which are used by nearby autotrophs, scavengers help conserve energy and nutrients obtained from carrion within the upper trophic levels, and are able to disperse the energy and nutrients farther away from the site of the carrion than decomposers.

Scavenging unites animals which normally would not come into contact, and results in the formation of highly structured and complex communities which engage in nonrandom interactions. Scavenging communities function in the redistribution of energy obtained from carcasses and reducing diseases associated with decomposition. Oftentimes, scavenger communities differ in consistency due to carcass size and carcass types, as well as by seasonal effects as consequence of differing invertebrate and microbial activity.

Competition for carrion results in the inclusion or exclusion of certain scavengers from access to carrion, shaping the scavenger community. When carrion decomposes at a slower rate during cooler seasons, competitions between scavengers decrease, while the number of scavenger species present increases.

Alterations in scavenging communities may result in drastic changes to the scavenging community in general, reduce ecosystem services and have detrimental effects on animal and humans. The reintroduction of gray wolves (Canis lupus) into Yellowstone National Park in the United States caused drastic changes to the prevalent scavenging community, resulting in the provision of carrion to many mammalian and avian species. Likewise, the reduction of vulture species in India lead to the increase of opportunistic species such as feral dogs and rats. The presence of both species at carcasses resulted in the increase of diseases such as rabies and bubonic plague in wildlife and livestock, as feral dogs and rats are transmitters of such diseases. Furthermore, the decline of vulture populations in India has been linked to the increased rates of anthrax in humans due to the handling and ingestion of infected livestock carcasses. An increase of disease transmission has been observed in mammalian scavengers in Kenya due to the decrease in vulture populations in the area, as the decrease in vulture populations resulted in an increase of the number of mammalian scavengers at a given carcass along with the time spent at a carcass.

=== Disease transmission ===
Scavenging may provide a direct and indirect method for transmitting disease between animals. Scavengers of infected carcasses may become hosts for certain pathogens and consequently vectors of disease themselves. An example of this phenomenon is the increased transmission of tuberculosis observed when scavengers engage in eating infected carcasses. Likewise, the ingestion of bat carcasses infected with rabies by striped skunks (Mephitis mephitis) resulted in increased infection of these organisms with the virus.

A major vector of transmission of diseases are various bird species, with outbreak being influenced by such carrier birds and their environment. An avian cholera outbreak from 2006 to 2007 off the coast Newfoundland, Canada resulted in the mortality of many marine bird species. The transmission, perpetuation and spread of the outbreak was mainly restricted to gull species who scavenge for food in the area. Similarly, an increase of transmission of avian influenza virus to chickens by domestic ducks from Indonesian farms permitted to scavenge surrounding areas was observed in 2007. The scavenging of ducks in rice paddy fields in particular resulted in increased contact with other bird species feeding on leftover rice, which may have contributed to increased infection and transmission of the avian influenza virus. The domestic ducks may not have demonstrated symptoms of infection themselves, though were observed to excrete high concentrations of the avian influenza virus.

== Threats ==
Many species that scavenge face persecution globally. Vultures, in particular, have faced incredible persecution and threats by humans. Before its ban by regional governments in 2006, the veterinary drug Diclofenac has resulted in at least a 95% decline of Gyps vultures in Asia. Habitat loss and food shortage have contributed to the decline of vulture species in West Africa due to the growing human population and over-hunting of vulture food sources, as well as changes in livestock husbandry. Poisoning certain predators to increase the number of game animals is still a common hunting practice in Europe and contributes to the poisoning of vultures when they consume the carcasses of poisoned predators.

== Benefits to humans ==
Highly efficient scavengers, also known as dominant or apex-scavengers, can have benefits to humans. Increases in dominant scavenger populations, such as vultures, can reduce populations of smaller opportunistic scavengers, such as rats. These smaller scavengers are often pests and disease vectors.

== In humans ==
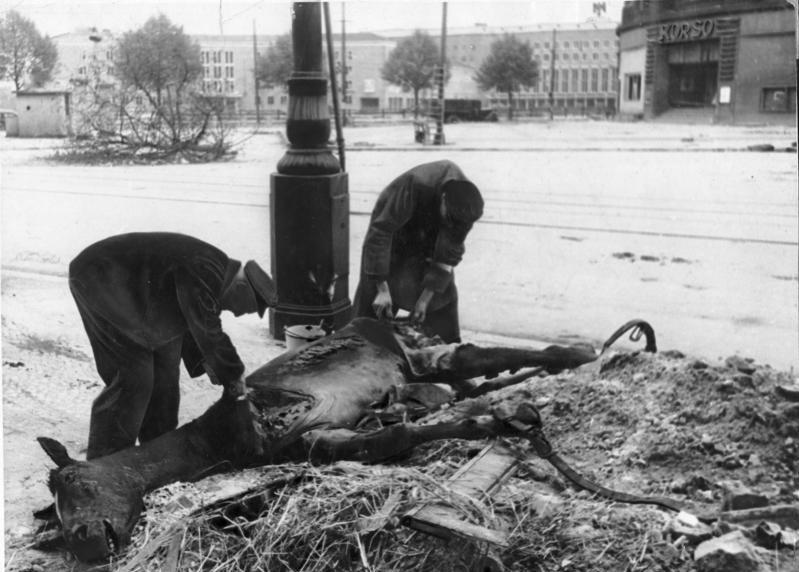
Men scavenging a dead horse during World War II (at the end of the Battle of Berlin), on Manfred-von-Richthofen-Straße in Tempelhof borough, 1945

In the 1980s, Lewis Binford suggested that early humans primarily obtained meat via scavenging, not through hunting. In 2010, Dennis Bramble and Daniel Lieberman proposed that early carnivorous human ancestors subsequently developed long-distance running behaviors which improved the ability to scavenge and hunt: they could reach scavenging sites more quickly and also pursue a single animal until it could be safely killed at close range due to exhaustion and hyperthermia.

In Tibetan Buddhism, the practice of excarnation—that is, the exposure of dead human bodies to carrion birds and/or other scavenging animals—is the distinctive characteristic of sky burial, which involves the dismemberment of human cadavers of whom the remains are fed to vultures, and traditionally the main funerary rite (alongside cremation) used to dispose of the human body. A similar funerary practice that features excarnation can be found in Zoroastrianism; in order to prevent the pollution of the sacred elements (fire, earth, and water) from contact with decomposing bodies, human cadavers are exposed on the Towers of Silence to be eaten by vultures and wild dogs.

Studies in behavioral ecology and ecological epidemiology have shown that cannibalistic necrophagy, although rare, has been observed as a survival behavior in several social species, including anatomically modern humans; however, episodes of human cannibalism occur rarely in most human societies. (Note: For further informations about cannibalistic necrophagy among humans, see the articles Homo antecessor and List of incidents of cannibalism.) Many instances have occurred in human history, especially in times of war and famine, where necrophagy and human cannibalism emerged as a survival behavior, although anthropologists report the usage of ritual cannibalism among funerary practices and as the preferred means of disposal of the dead in some tribal societies.

== Gallery ==
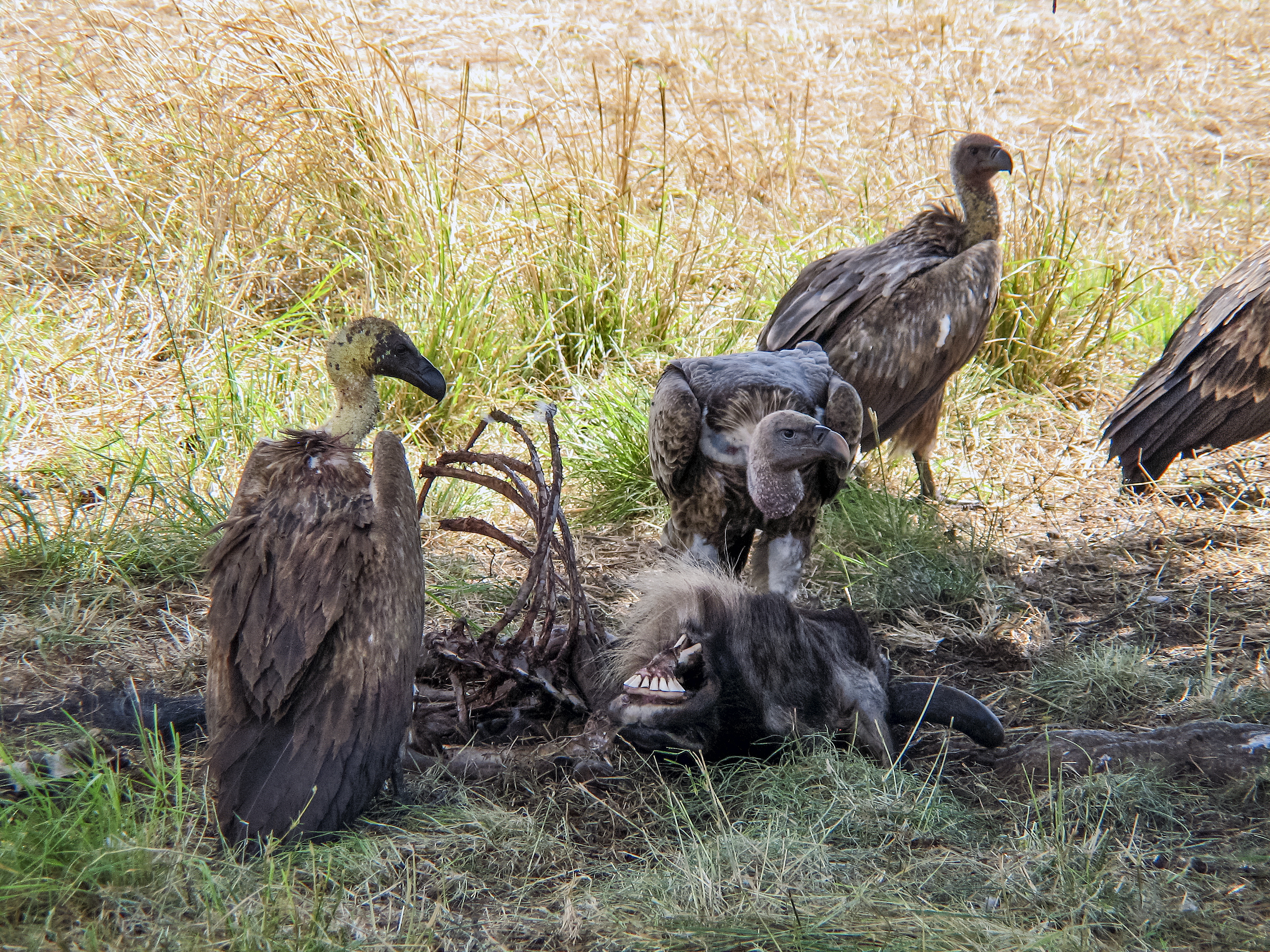
White-backed vultures feeding on a carcass of a wildebeest

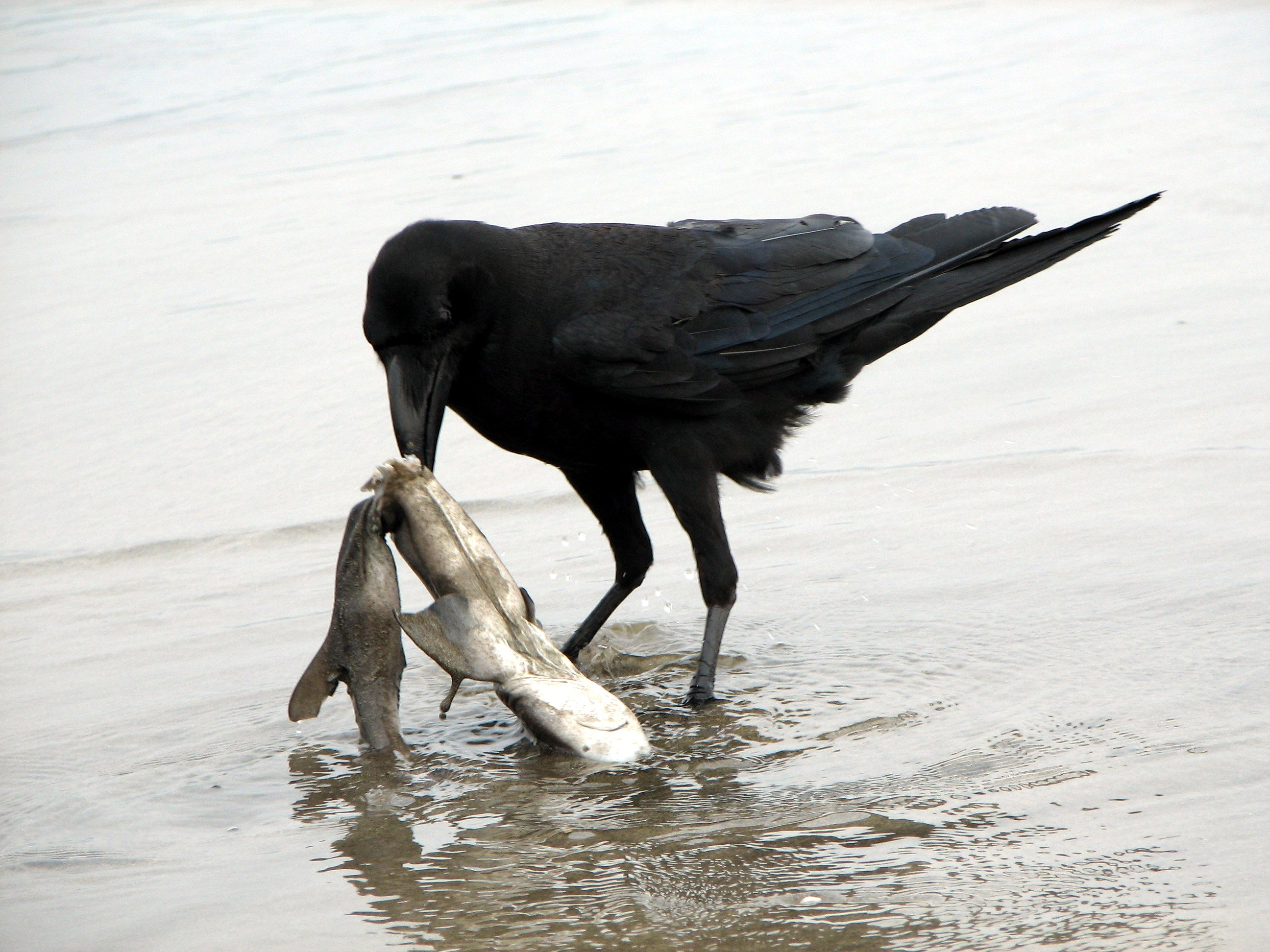
A jungle crow feeding on a small dead shark

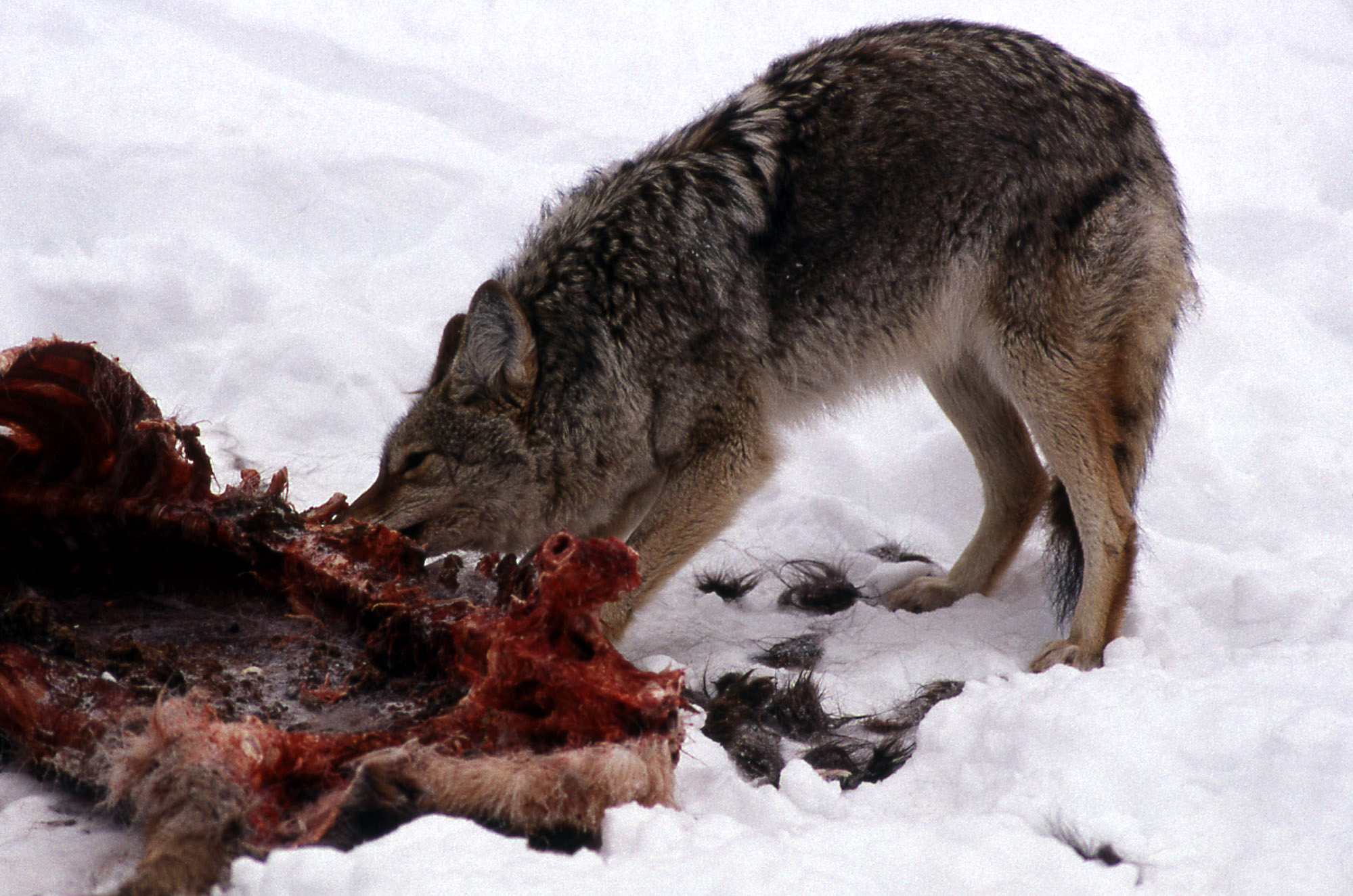
Coyote feeding on an elk carcass in winter in Lamar Valley, near Yellowstone National Park

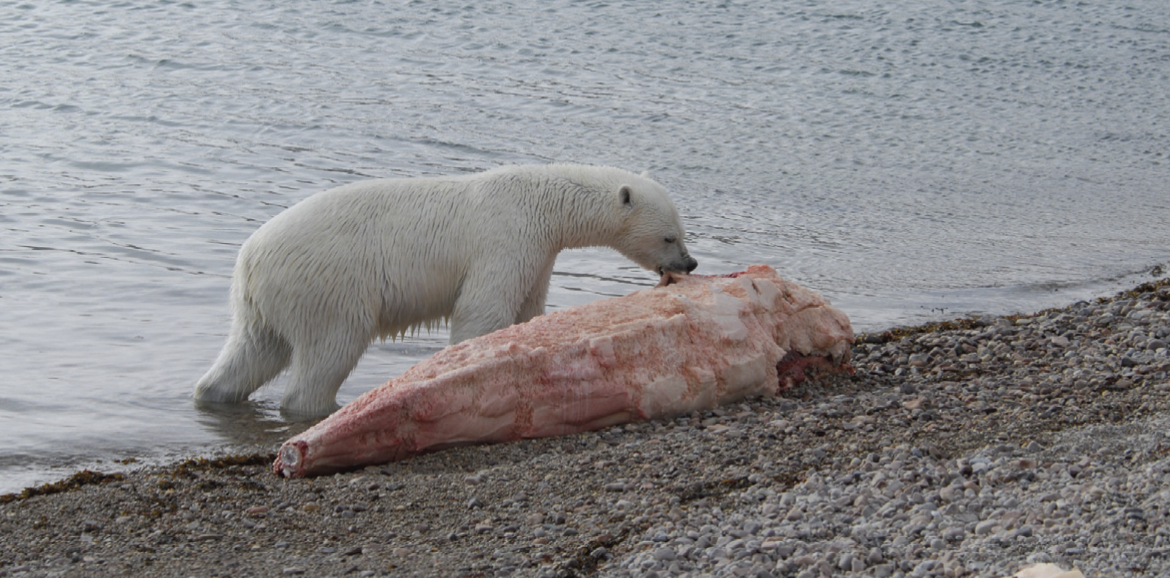
A polar bear scavenging on a narwhal carcass

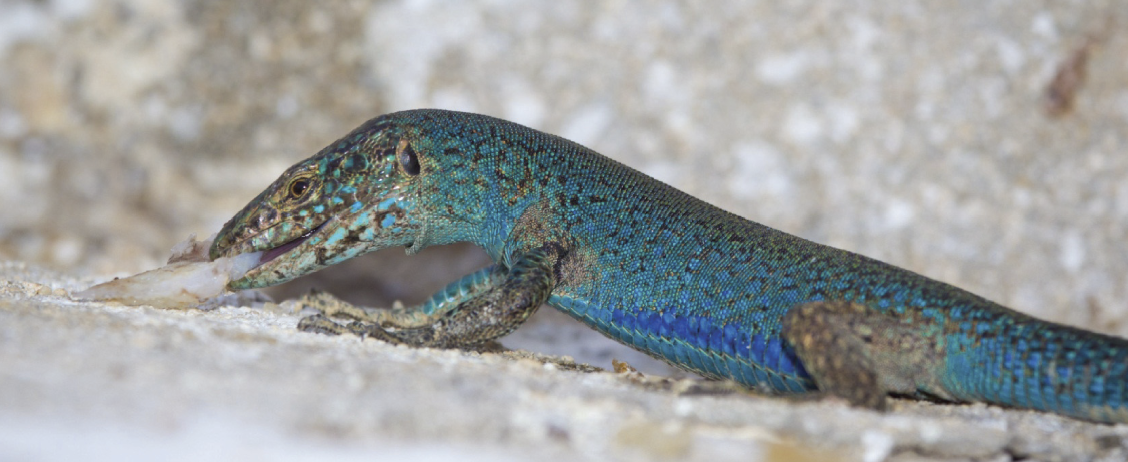
An Ibiza wall lizard scavenging on fish scraps left over from another predator

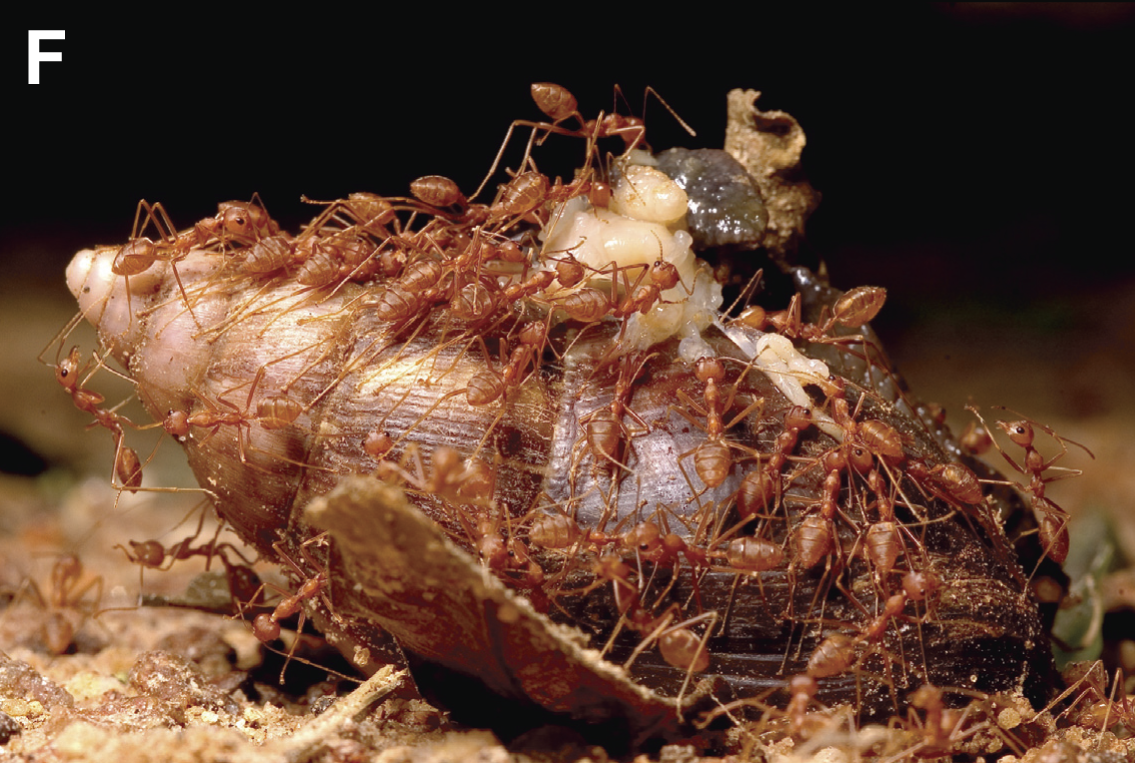
Red weaver ants feeding on a dead giant African snail

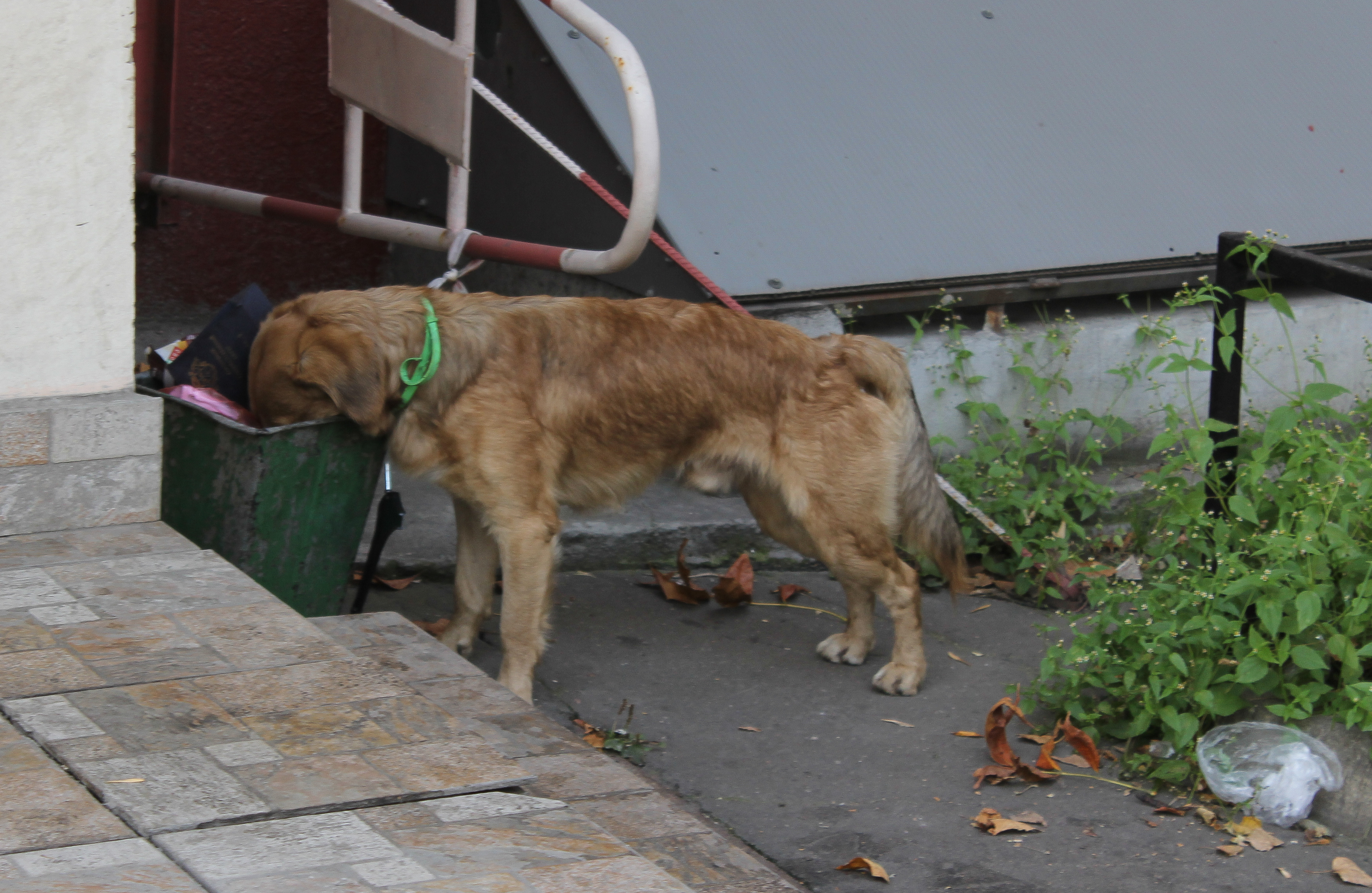
A feral dog scavenging for food in a trash bin in Moscow

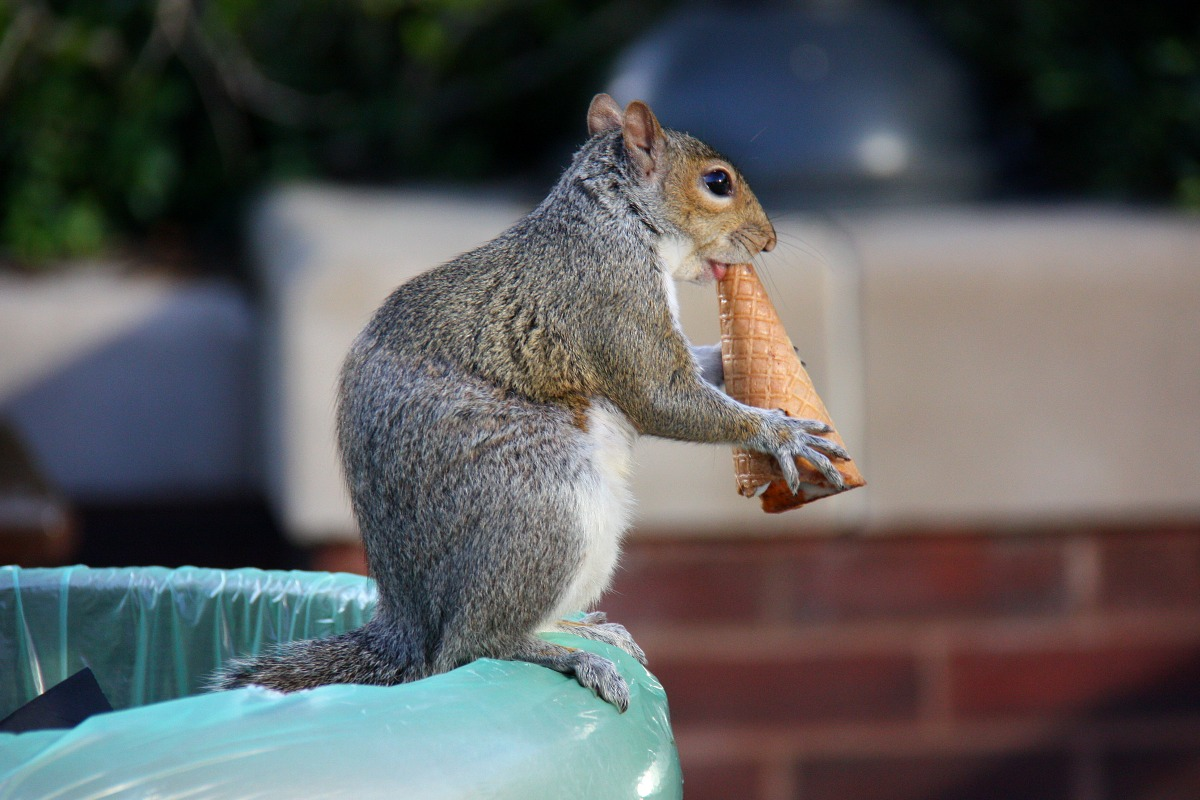
A gray squirrel scavenging food scraps from a trash bin in London

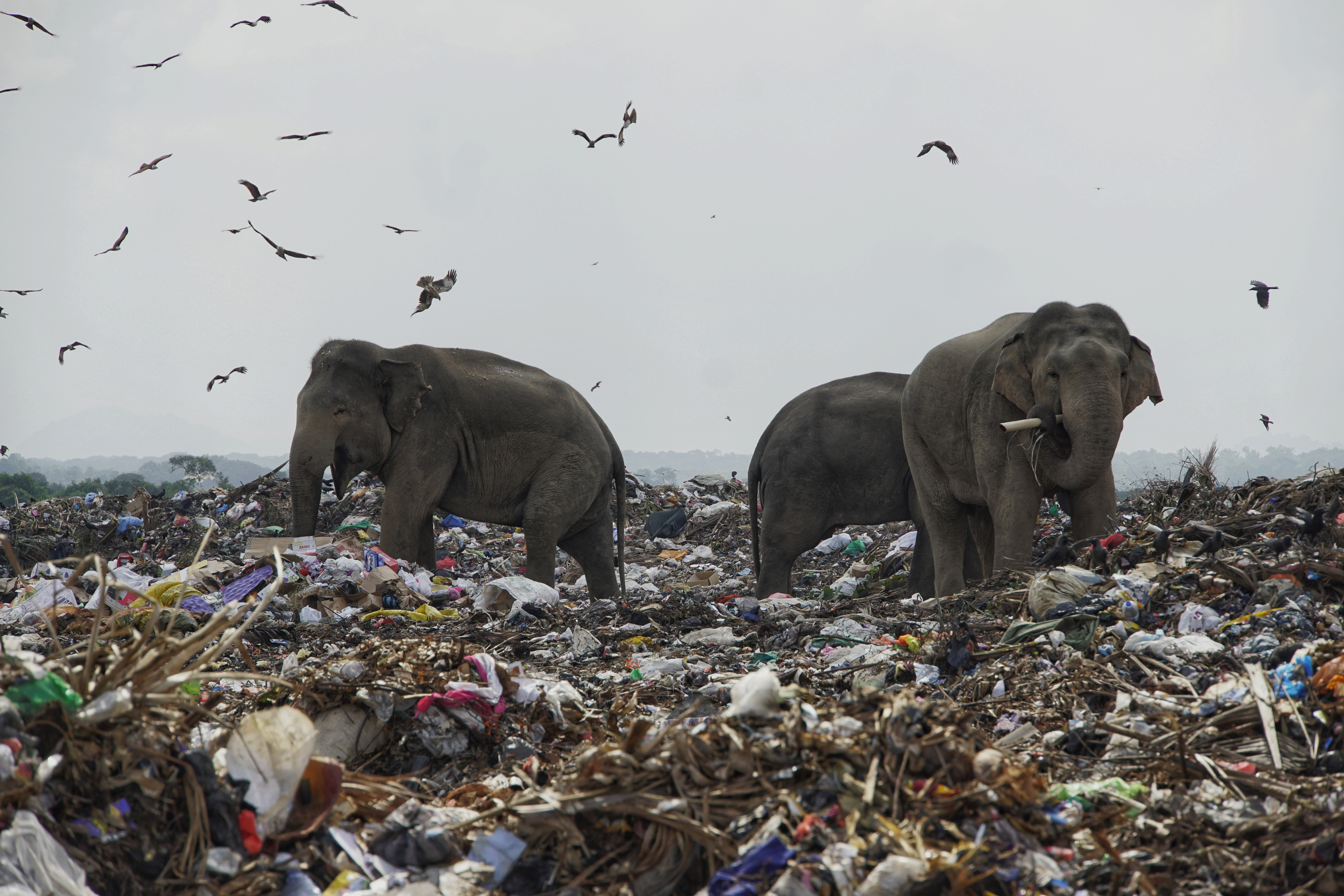
Asian elephants scavenging for food at a municipal dump in Sri Lanka

== See also ==
- Consumer-resource systems
