= Carrion =

Dead and decaying flesh of an animal

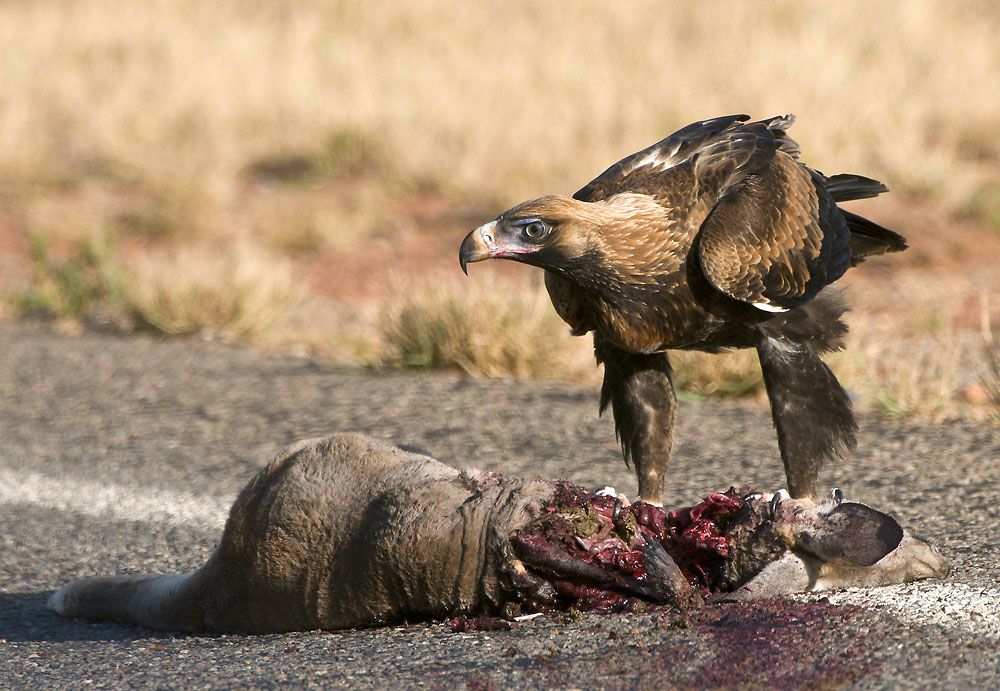
A wedge-tailed eagle and carrion (roadkill kangaroo) in the Pilbara region of Western Australia.

Zoarcid fish feeding on the carrion of a mobulid ray.

Carrion (from Latin caro 'meat'), also known as a carcass, is the decaying flesh of dead animals. Carrion may be of natural or anthropic origin (e.g. wildlife, human remains, livestock), and enters the food chain via different routes (e.g. animals dying of disease or malnutrition, predators and hunters discarding parts of their prey, collisions with automobiles).

Carrion is an important food source for large carnivores and omnivores in most ecosystems. Examples of carrion-eating animals include vultures, eagles, hyenas, Virginia opossum, Tasmanian devils, and coyotes. Many invertebrates, for example carrion beetles, burying beetles, blow-fly maggots, and flesh-fly maggots, also eat carrion. All of these animals, together with microbial decomposers, help to recycle nitrogen and carbon in animal remains.

The act of eating carrion is termed necrophagy or necrophagia, and animals that do this are described as necrophages or carrion feeders. The term scavenger is widely used to describe carrion-eating animals too, but this term is broader in scope, encompassing also the consumption of refuse and dead plant material.

Carrion begins to decay at the moment of the animal's death, and it will increasingly attract insects and breed bacteria. Not long after the animal has died, its body will begin to exude a foul odor caused by the presence of bacteria and the emission of cadaverine and putrescine.

== Disease transmission ==
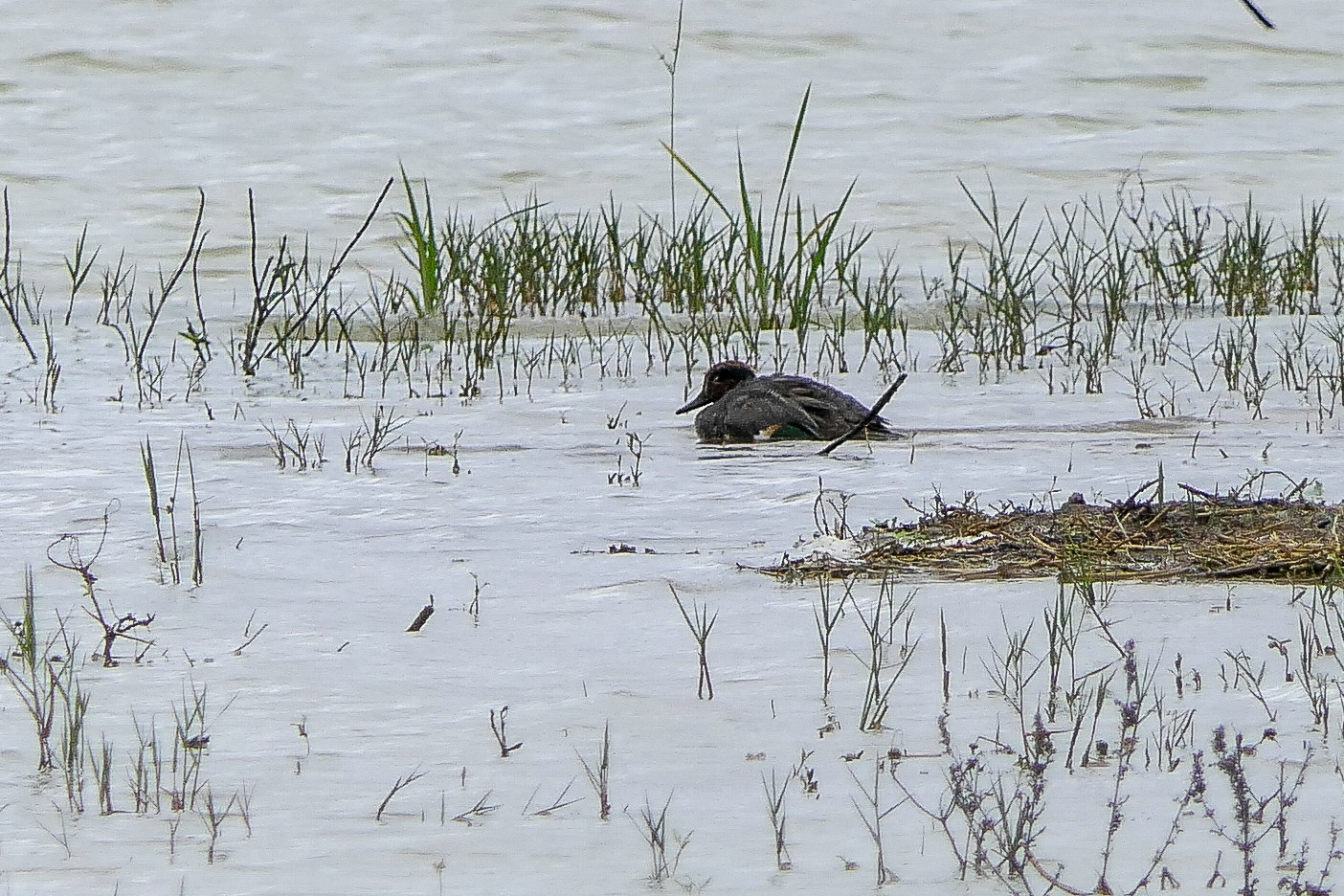
Duck carrion (e.g. Anas crecca carrion) can harbor Clostridium botulinum and Pasteurella multocida.

Carrion can harbor many infectious and disease-causing agents including viruses (e.g. rabies virus, West Nile virus), bacteria (e.g. Bacillus anthracis, Clostridium botulinum, Francisella tularensis, Listeria monocytogenes, Pasteurella multocida, Yersinia pestis), bacterial toxins (e.g. botulinum) and helminths (e.g. Trichinella species).

Several outbreaks of disease, attributed to direct or indirect contact with carrion, have been reported in humans and animals.

== Consumption as food ==
=== Consumption by invertebrates ===
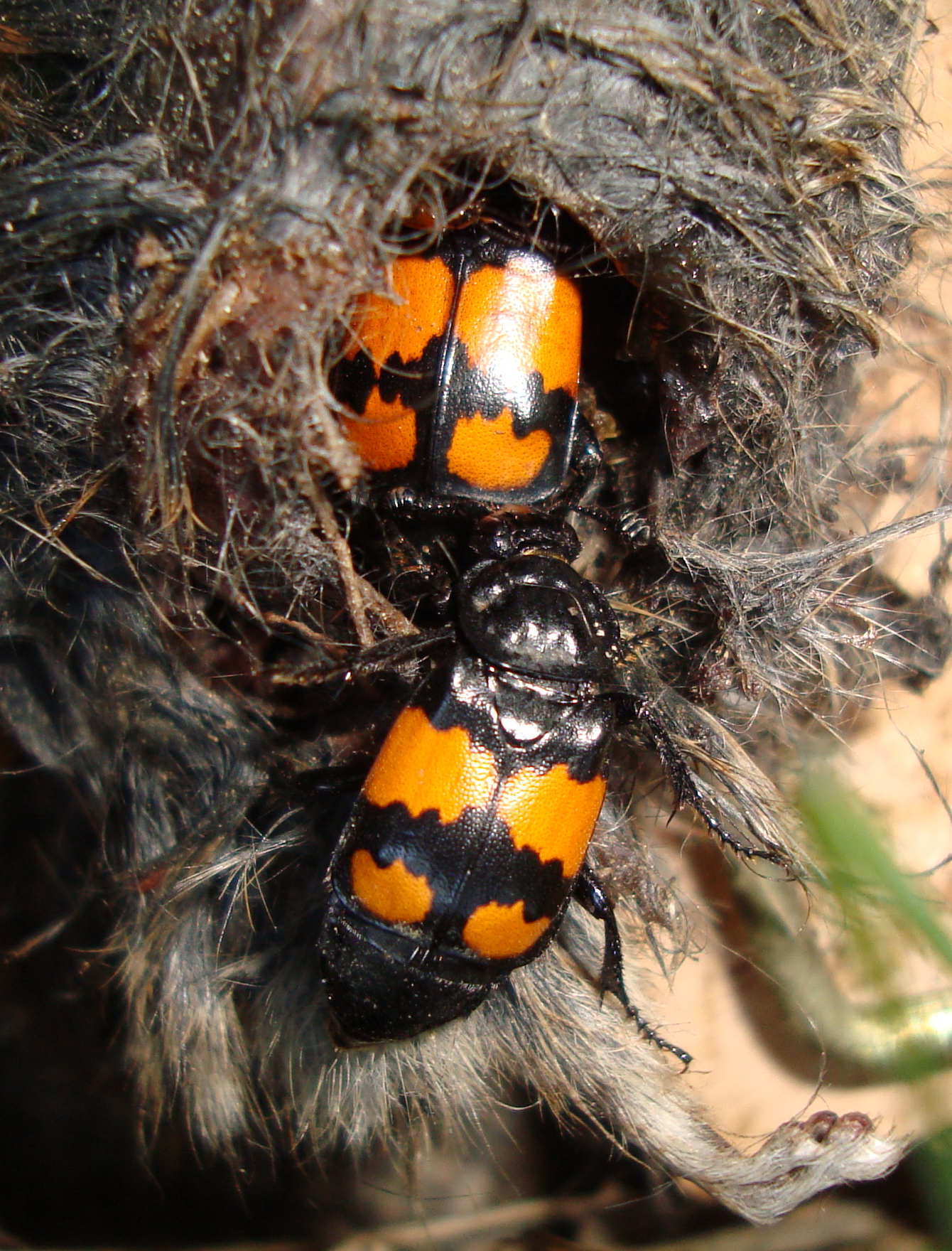
Two burying beetles (Nicrophorus vespilloides) feeding on rodent carrion.

Hundreds of invertebrate animals feed on carrion. In terrestrial settings, some ant species eat carrion (e.g. red imported fire ants), as do some bees (i.e. vulture bees), and many beetles (e.g. burying beetles, dermestid beetles, silphine beetles) and flies (e.g. bone skippers, blow flies, flesh flies). Several species rely on carrion for survival or reproduction, including the vulture bee Trigona crassipes, the burying beetle Nicrophorus vespilloides, and the bone skipper fly Thyreophora cynophila.

Many aquatic animals also eat carrion. Necrophagous marine invertebrates include cephalopods (e.g. Octopus vulgaris), hermit crabs (e.g. Coenobita clypeatus), star fish (e.g. Luidia ciliaris), whelks (e.g. Tritia reticulata), amphipods (e.g. Eurythenes atacamensis), and annelids (e.g. zombie worms). Necrophagous freshwater invertebrates include the horse leech Haemopis marmorata, the crayfish Procambarus clarkii, and the diving beetle Thermonectus succinctus.

=== Consumption by vertebrates ===
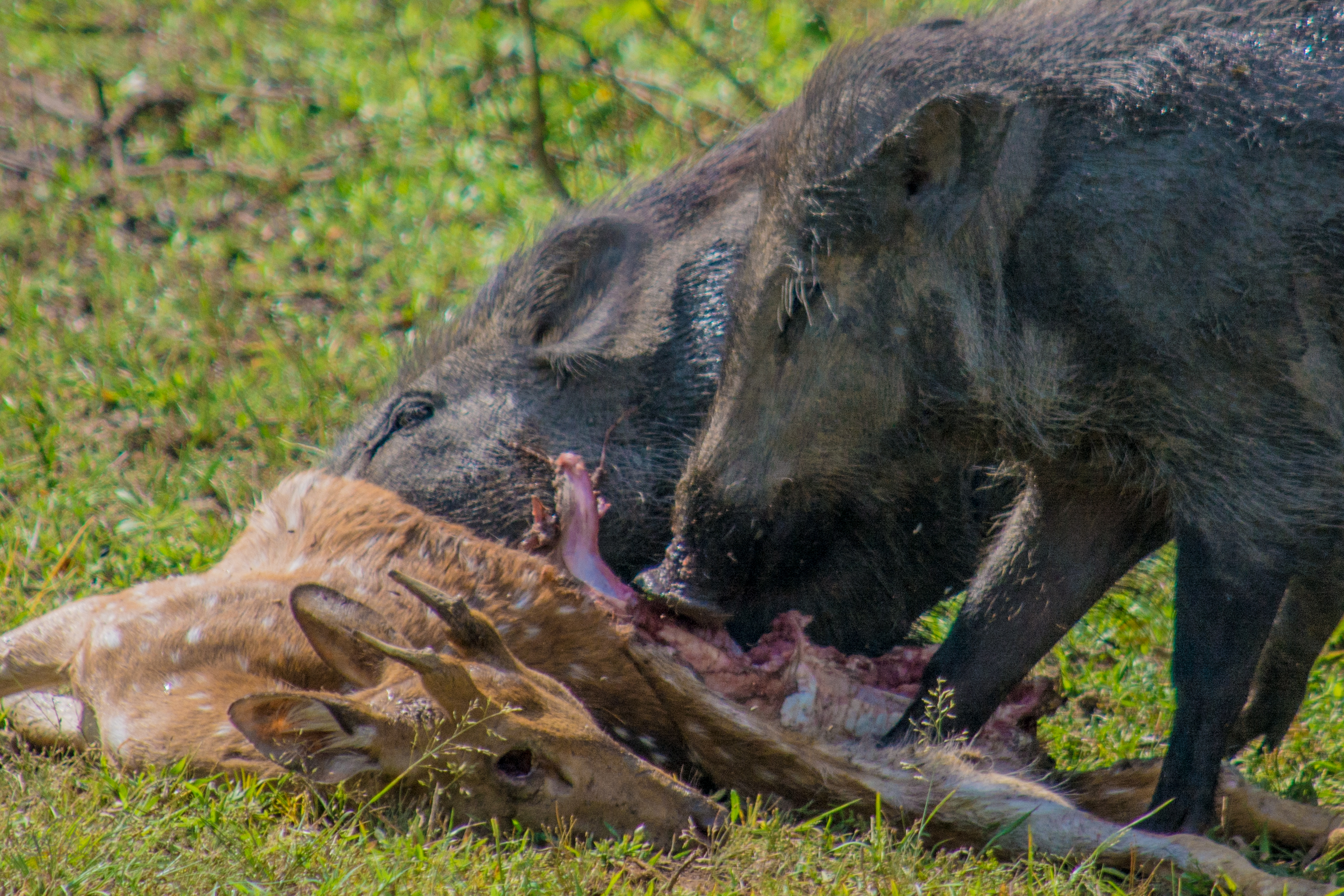
Wild boars (Sus scrofa) feeding on deer carrion.

Large numbers of vertebrate animals feed on carrion, including different species of birds (e.g. cinereous vultures, red-tailed hawks, carrion crows), fish (e.g. black hagfish, abyssal grenadiers), mammals (e.g. spotted hyenas, wild boars), reptiles (e.g. Komodo dragons, brown tree snakes) and even amphibians (e.g. midwife toad larvae, túngara frog larvae).

With the possible exception of some hagfish species, the only vertebrates known to rely on carrion for survival are the New World vultures (e.g. black vultures) and Old World vultures (e.g. cinereous vultures).

Most of the animals that eat carrion opportunistically are carnivores (e.g. spotted hyenas, abyssal grenadiers) or omnivores (e.g. wild boars), but some herbivores (e.g. Egyptian mastigures) also eat carrion in times of food scarcity.

=== Consumption by early hominins ===
Early hominins (e.g. Homo habilis, Homo erectus) are thought to have obtained at least some of the protein and fat in their diet by scavenging meat and bone marrow from the carcasses of large mammals abandoned by predators. This is based on several observations. First, tools of the Early Pleistocene (e.g. Oldowan choppers) were more suited to butchering carcasses than hunting. Second, at many archaeological sites, animal bones have been recovered where tool cuts made by H. habilis are present over tooth marks made by carnivores. In addition, it has been observed that current-day predators (e.g. lions) leave large portions of their kills intact, and it is thought that saber-toothed cats in the Middle Pleistocene would have done likewise.

Later in the Quaternary period, hominins turned more to hunting for food. At what stage this happened is unclear. Some researchers propose that Homo neanderthalensis was more a hunter than a scavenger based on stable isotope analyses and other evidence. However, this interpretation of the isotopic data has been questioned. Later still, hominins turned to herding wild animals and the husbandry of domesticated animals.

=== Consumption by modern humans ===
Carrion consumption by modern humans (Homo sapiens) has been documented on several occasions. Examples of carrion eaten include predator kills (e.g. zebra, wildebeest, impala, giraffe), beached marine mammals (e.g. dead whale) and dead livestock (e.g. water buffalo). At least two outbreaks of disease (anthrax and botulism) have been reported, one in 1987, the other in 2002. According to the U.S. Centers for Disease Control and Prevention (CDC), additional (unpublished) outbreaks of botulism have occurred from marine carrion consumption.

Unlike vultures, coyotes and other carrion-eating animals, humans are extremely sensitive to botulinum toxin. This toxin is produced by Clostridium botulinum, a bacterium found in soil and seabeds that can colonize animal bodies after they’ve died.

Among modern-day hunter-gatherer communities who regularly eat carrion as part of their diet, some precautionary behaviors have been documented. These include prioritizing reaching carcasses quickly after death, butchering and disemboweling the carcass, and cooking or sun-drying the meat and viscera recovered.

== In religious literature ==
=== In Noahide law ===
The thirty-count laws of Ulla (Talmudist) include the prohibition of humans consuming carrion. This count is in addition to the standard seven law count and has been recently published from the Judeo-Arabic writing of Shmuel ben Hophni Gaon after having been lost for centuries.

=== In Islam ===
Animals killed by strangling, a violent blow, a headlong fall, being gored to death, or from which a predatory animal has partially eaten are considered types of carrion, and are forbidden in Islam.

== In English literature ==
Sometimes carrion is used to describe an infected carcass that is diseased and should not be touched. An example of carrion being used to describe dead and rotting bodies in literature may be found in William Shakespeare's play Julius Caesar (III.i):

Cry 'Havoc,' and let slip the dogs of war;
That this foul deed shall smell above the earth
With carrion men, groaning for burial.

Another example can be found in Daniel Defoe's Robinson Crusoe when the title character kills an unknown bird for food but finds "its flesh was carrion, and fit for nothing".

== Carrion flowers and stinkhorn mushrooms ==
Some plants and fungi smell like decomposing carrion and attract insects that aid in reproduction. Plants that exhibit this behavior are known as carrion flowers. Stinkhorn mushrooms are examples of fungi with this characteristic.

== Other images ==
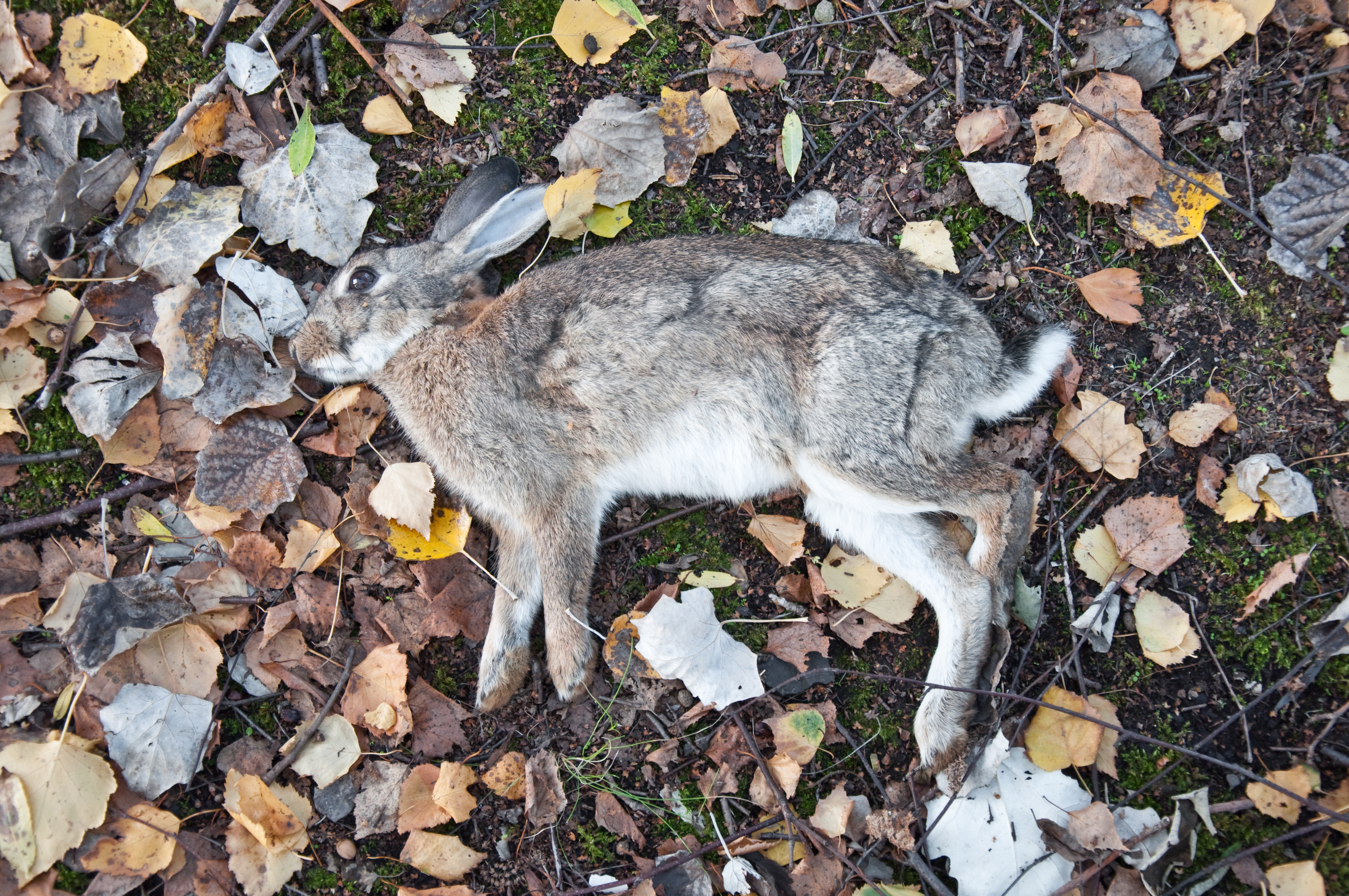
Rabbit carrion in Germany.

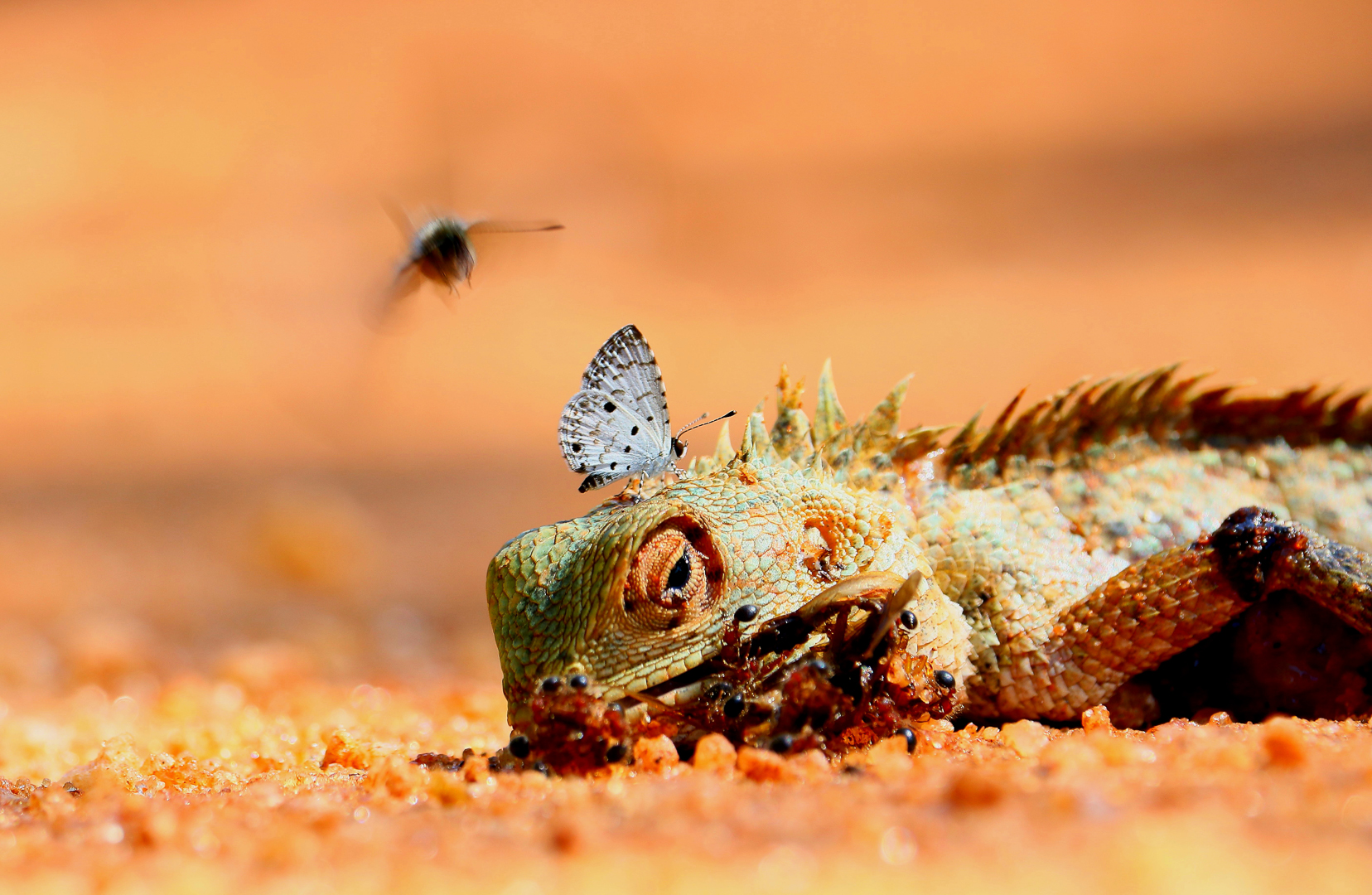
Butterfly puddling on lizard carrion.

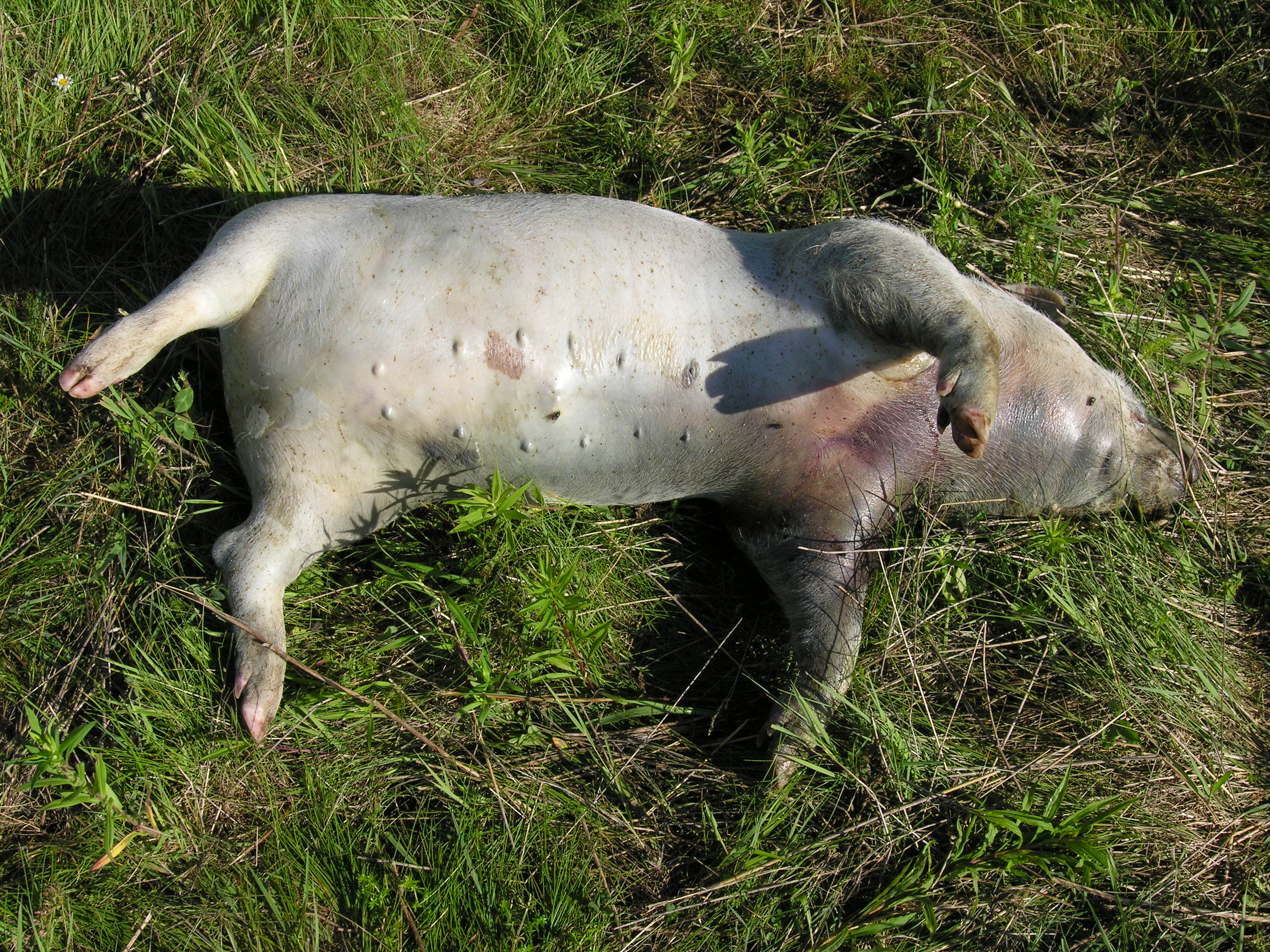
Dead pig in the bloat stage of decomposition.

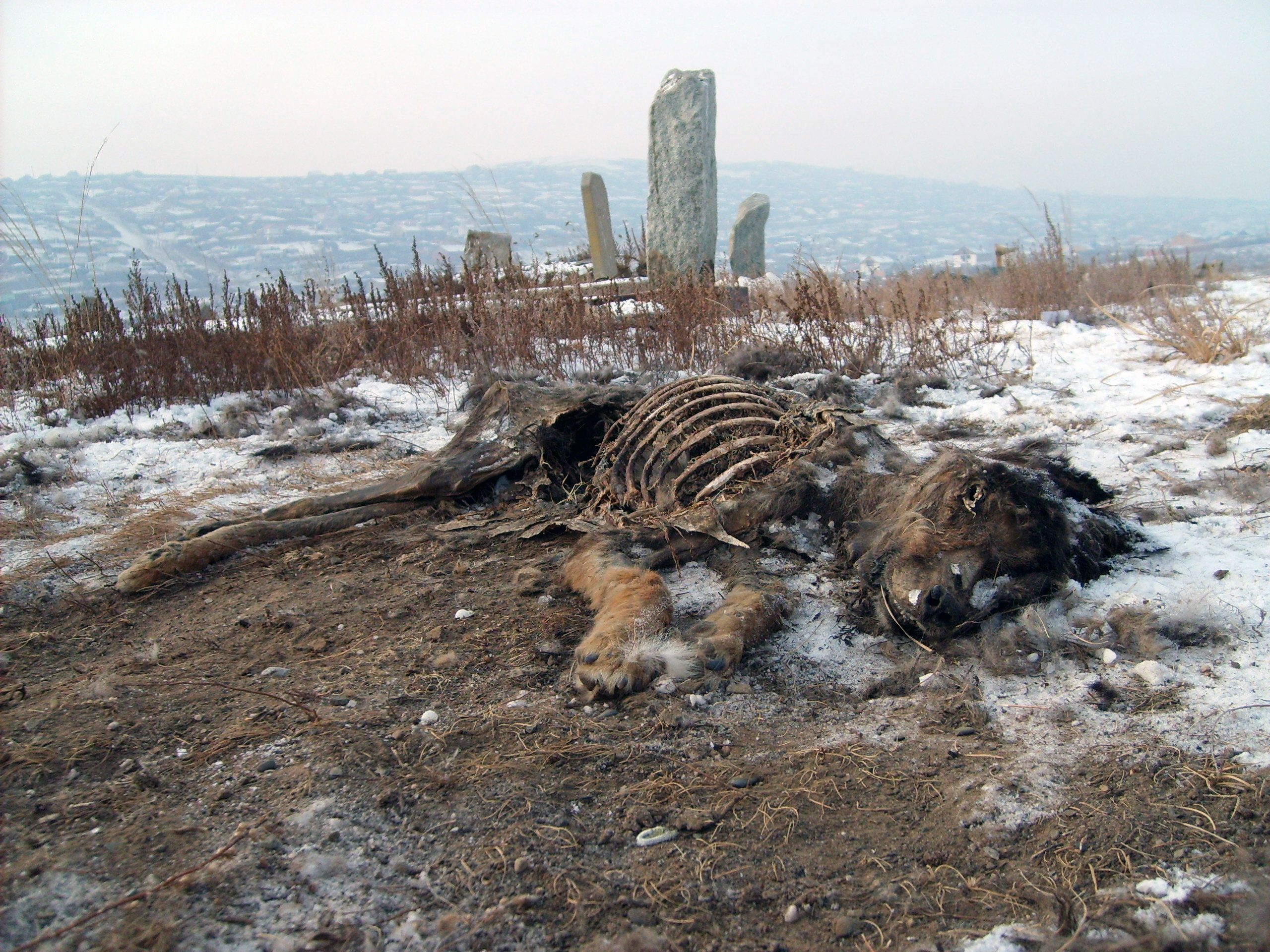
Dog carrion in Mongolia.

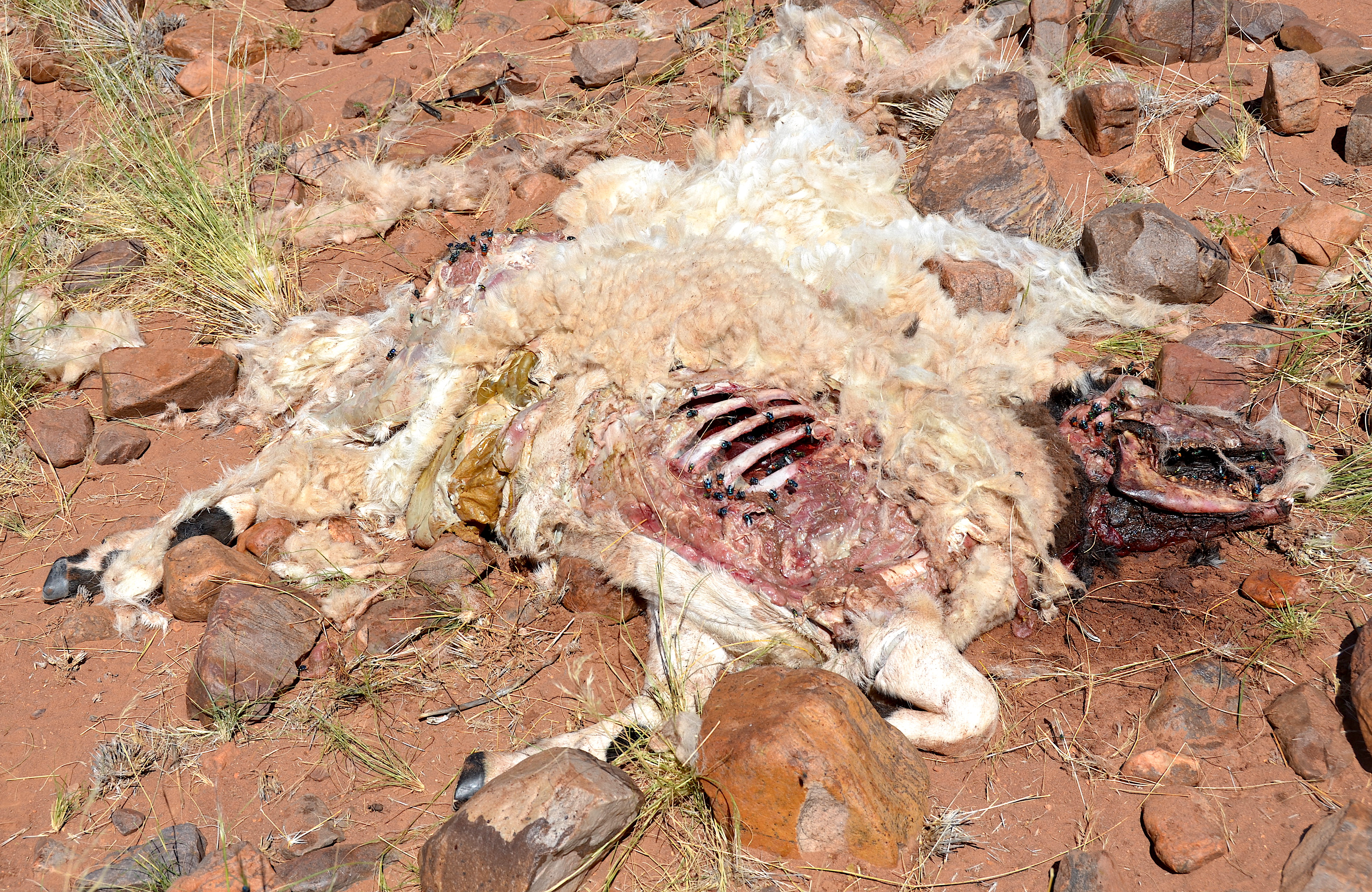
Flies settling on sheep carrion.

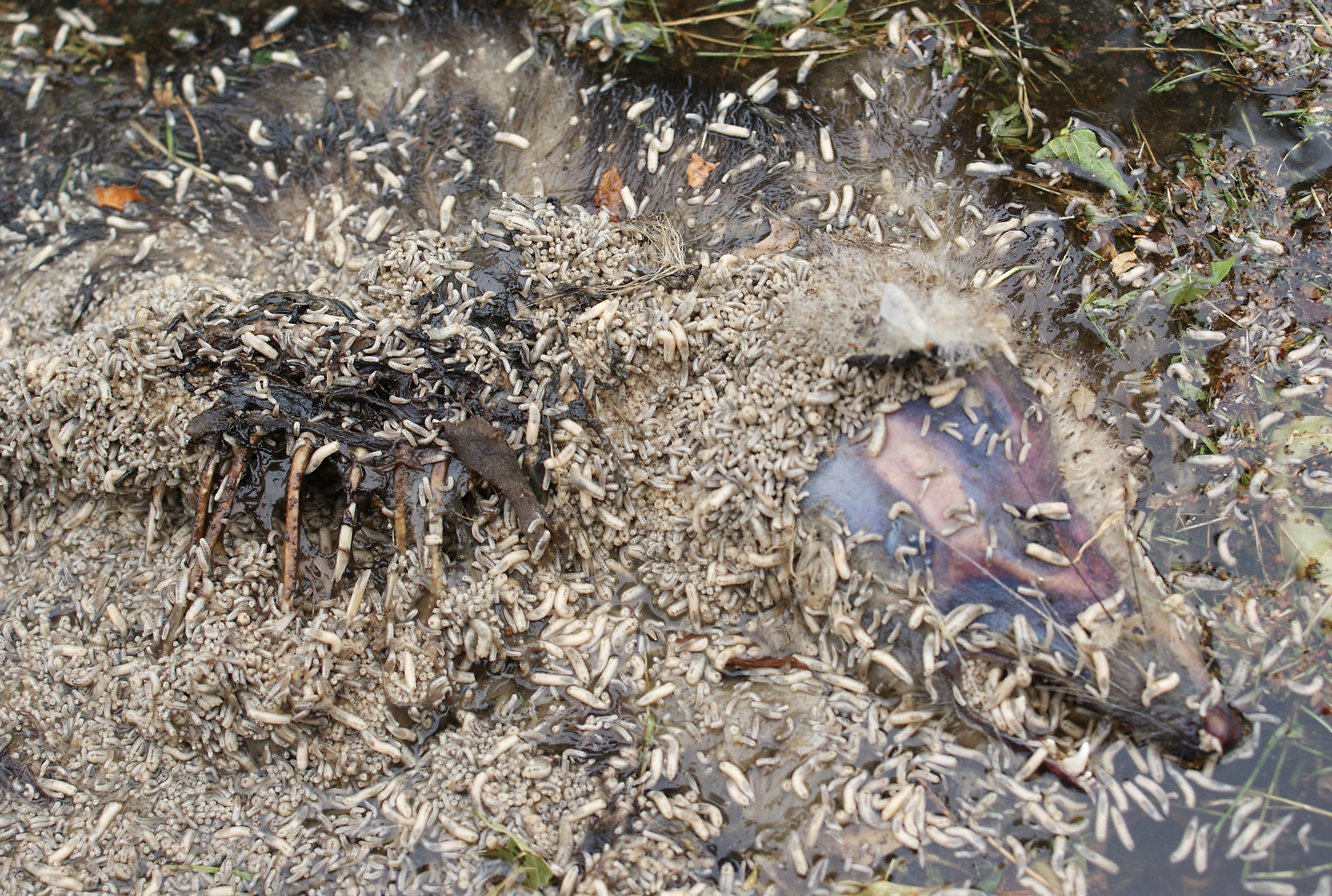
Heavily colonized opossum carrion.
