= Tokunagayusurika akamusi =

Scientific classification
- Kingdom: Animalia
- Phylum: Arthropoda
- Class: Insecta
- Order: Diptera
- Family: Chironomidae
- Genus: Tokunagayusurika
- Species: T. akamusi

Binomial name
- Tokunagayusurika akamusi (Tokunaga 1938)

Species of fly

Tokunagayusurika akamusi is a midge fly species of the family Chironomidae.

Described by Tokunaga in 1938, the species is common to eutrophic lakes in Japan. The midge family is very similar to the mosquito family in morphology, except that they do not feed on human blood.

The larvae are commonly called bloodworms and are used as fishing bait in Japan. Their larvae are detritivores that feed on organic matter at the bottom of freshwater bodies. Adult midges rarely feed since they only emerge during fall and live up to a few weeks. As adult male midges emerge, they form large swarms that make dance-like movements in the air to facilitate mating, so as to attract females to approach the swarms. Such swarming behavior helps facilitate mating, but is also a severe nuisance to Japanese local residents, as well as tourists in areas close to eutrophic lakes or polluted water bodies in Japan.

== Taxonomy ==
Tokunagayusurika akamusi is in the family of Chironomidae and in the order Diptera. The most ancient families of flies are midges, mosquitoes, and others in their broad subgroup of flies. The family name, Chironomidae, is derived from the Greek word for "pantomimist" which describes someone who pantomimes, for the fly's typical posture of having its forelegs held out in front of its body. More than 7,300 species in this family have been described scientifically.

== Description ==
Adult T. akamusi has a body length of 8 to 9.5 millimetres (0.31 to 0.37 in), and is dark grey to black in color. As true flies, the species has only one pair of wings. Adult midges look very similar to mosquitoes in that their bodies are slender and dainty. Both species have long, narrow wings and long, thin legs. Male midges often have feathery antennae which sense the high-pitched sounds made by female wings. However, it is possible to distinguish them from mosquitos because they do not have scales on their wings like mosquitoes do, and they tend to hold their first pair of legs forward when at rest, as opposed to outward as mosquitoes do. Additionally, midges do not bite, corresponding to the name nonbiting midge.

== Distribution and habitat ==
Midge larvae live at the bottom of lakes, ponds, and other freshwater bodies. They usually use fine sediment and mucus to construct tubes to live in. Adult midges are common near freshwater bodies, as females lay eggs and new generations of larvae live and emerge from there. In Japan, adults generally emerge during October and November. However, the time of emergence also varies, depending on the lake and its water temperature. For instance, at the shores of Lake Biwa, the largest freshwater lake in Japan, midges emerge from November to early December.

== Life history ==
The life history of T. akamusi consists of four stages: egg, larva, and adult. Most of its lifetime is spent in the larval stage at the bottom of freshwater bodies, which spans from 1 to 3 years. Midge larvae are commonly called bloodworms, because of their red color from the hemoglobin molecules inside their long, thin, cylindrical bodies. The body is usually curved and has segments and a distinctly separated head, which is typically of a darker color than the rest of the body. They are often used as baits in fishing. When they emerge as adults, they usually only live for a few weeks. The species typically emerges in autumn, and its emergence depends on the temperature of the bottom water in the lakes. It usually takes place when the temperature of the bottom water is in the range of 10 to 18 degrees Celsius. The species is once studied in Lake Suwa and Lake Kasumigaura, where 99 percent of cumulative emergence took place in between the temperature 10.2 and 14.2 degrees Celsius and 1 percent cumulative emergence in between 15.3 and 18.1 degrees Celsius. The study has concluded that a decrease in bottom water temperature could trigger the emergence of T. akamusi and a further decrease below 10 degrees Celsius could terminate the pupation.

== Food resources ==
Midge larvae are detritivores and eat a variety of organic matter. Adult midges, however, rarely take in anything but moisture (honeydew, flower nectar, etc.). They have short proboscis, unlike mosquitoes, and do not bite humans.

== Mating ==
The mating system of T. akamusi consists of two alternative tactics–one is swarming and the other is ground searching. Swarming is when males wait for mates in an aerial swarm in the air. Ground searching is when males actively search for mates on vegetation. A study on males’ wing length and their mating tactics has found that large males tended to form groups in swarms, where the larger males among the swarming males mated with more females. Here, male body sizes are determined by their longer wing lengths. Small males, however, tended to find mates through ground searching, and this pattern seemed stronger when large males already formed groups in swarming. The study also looked at the wing asymmetry in males and found that males who have extremely asymmetric wings (wings of very different lengths) were less successful at mating. When male midges search for females, their antennae respond to the unique frequency of the sound made by female wingbeats. Observers have reported that singing a particular musical note, clapping hands, or making certain sudden noises can cause an entire swarm of these flies to suddenly leap upward or closer to the sound, or wild disarray in their collective movements.

== Swarming ==
Male midges are famous for aggregating in big swarms that “dance” in the air. Such cloud-like swarms often form in early evening when the sun is getting low, at the tip of a bush, on a hilltop, over a pool of water, or even sometimes above a person. The forming of such swarms is not out of instinct, but an adaptive behavior – a “consensus” – between the individuals within the swarms. There is also a pattern within each swarm that explains the “dancing.” Each individual midge in the swarm flies to the farthest upwind edge of the marker zone, and then slowly flows to the downwind side, followed by flying back to the upwind edge. Together, it looks like all individual midges are tied to the marker, “like tiny balloons.” Swarming serves multiple purposes, including the facilitation of mating. However, it is also suggested that swarming is a ritual, because there is rarely any male midge by itself and not in a swarm. This could have formed due to the benefit of lowering inbreeding by having males of various genes gathering in one spot.

=== Wing movements ===
Certain "gnat-like midges" beat their wings more than 1,000 cycles per second (more than 1,000 Hz), making them the fastest wingbeats in the world. However, these "midges" are in the genus of Forcipomyia, commonly called biting midges. Within the common midge family, on the other hand, 650 and 700 Hz sets the general range of wingbeat frequencies. Though slower than biting midges, their wing movements are still extremely fast. Such wing movements, hovering, and other aerodynamic feats are only possible because of the flies' asynchronous muscle systems. Their muscle systems are asynchronous because there is not a direct correlation between each muscle contraction and a wing flap. Instead, the muscle contractions cause changes in the shape of the thorax of the midges, which facilitates the extremely fast movements of their wings.

== Enemies ==
A large variety of animals feed on midge larvae and adults, making midges prey to these animals. One example of a midge enemy is the dragonfly, which often flies repeatedly through midge swarms to capture midges for nutrients.

== Genomes ==
There have been several extensive studies on the hemoglobin of the aquatic midge 4th-instar larvae as a potential biomarker for monitoring environmental contaminants. In T. akamusi, the hemoglobin from 4th-instar larva consists of eleven individual components (IA, IB, II, III, IV, V, VIA, VIB, VII, VIII, IX) on a DEAE-cellulose column. The eleven components can be divided into two different types based on their spectroscopic features: normal type (N-type) and low type (L-type). The most distinctive difference between the two seems to be the presence or absence of the distal (E7) histidine residue, which is important to the stability of the bound dioxygen. The homology test for 40 N-terminal amino acid residues of all eleven components also demonstrates that T. akamusi hemoglobin consists of two different clusters. This further shows a very early separation of the N-type and L-type in the phylogenetic tree.

== Interactions with humans ==
=== Fishing baits ===
Bloodworms (midge larvae) can be used as fishing baits, and are widely sold on markets in Japan.

=== Midge allergy ===
Because of the distinctive mating system that male midges adopt, midges form large swarms in the air whenever they emerge during the mating season. Their emergence lines up with seasonal human allergic reactions, such as asthma and allergic rhinitis and has thus been suspected to cause seasonal human allergic reactions.

=== Nuisance ===
Tokunagayusurika akamusi midges are attracted to lights, both indoor and outside. They emerge from eutrophic lakes, as well as polluted water bodies in Japan. According to multiple studies in Japan, they have become intolerable because they pose a serious nuisance and hurt the economies. In the Lake Suwa area, massive swarms of adult midges of T. akamusi frequently occur after they emerge, and cause problems in the daily life of local residents and for the tourists as well. In the area, the emergence peaks each year around mid October. They also form swarms around and often land on windows, walls, and the laundry people have hung outside. They also swarm around wherever food is displayed outside, including food stands, restaurants, and grocery stores. Because of the problems they cause to the residents, the government often receives many complaints and are tasked with finding solutions.
