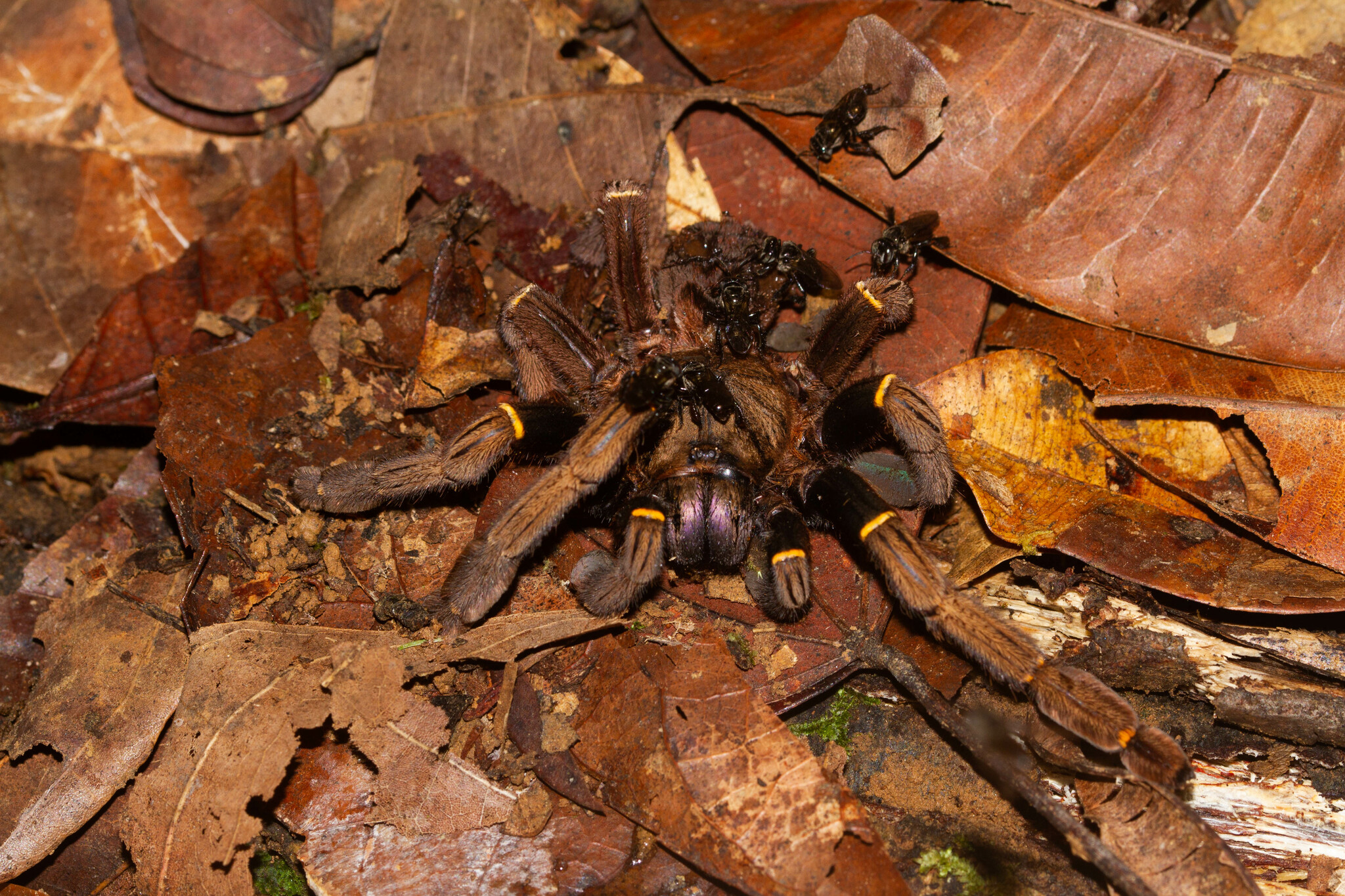

Scientific classification
- Kingdom: Animalia
- Phylum: Arthropoda
- Clade: Pancrustacea
- Class: Insecta
- Order: Hymenoptera
- Family: Apidae
- Genus: Trigona
- Subgenus: Trigona (Trigona)

Species
- Trigona crassipes (Fabricius, 1793); Trigona necrophaga (Camargo & Roubik, 1991); Trigona hypogea (Silvestri, 1902)

= Vulture bee =

Group of bees that feed on rotting meat

Vulture bees, also known as carrion bees, are a small group of three closely related South American stingless bee species in the genus Trigona which feed on rotting meat, called carrion. Some vulture bees produce a substance similar to royal jelly which is not derived from nectar, but rather from protein-rich secretions of the bees' hypopharyngeal glands. These secretions are likely derived from the bees' diet, which consists of carrion eaten outside the nest, and resulted in the belief that they produce what is known as "meat honey". This unusual behavior was only discovered in 1982, nearly two centuries after the bees were first classified.These species are scavengers that exhibit many of the same behaviors as other species of bees, such as honey bees.

== Taxonomy ==
The three species in this group are:

- Trigona crassipes (Fabricius, 1793)
- Trigona necrophaga (Camargo & Roubik, 1991)
- Trigona hypogea (Silvestri, 1902)

These bees are in the Meliponini tribe, with other stingless bees. The tribe is in the family Apidea, the same family vegetarian honeybees and bumblebees reside in.

== Description ==
Vulture bees are reddish-brown in color, featuring only a few lighter hairs on their thorax, and range in length from 8–22 millimetres (0.31–0.87 in). As with many types of stingless bee, vulture bees have strong, powerful mandibles, which are used to tear off carrion, and other food sources. Some types of these bees are omnivores, while some are strictly carnivores. Vulture bees have been recorded as foraging from more than 75 different species of animal and have even been reported eating fungi.

Forager vulture bees often enter dead animals through the eye sockets, collecting flesh, which is they chew and store. Similar to how honeybees process nectar with the aim of eventual regurgitation and storage as honey, the flesh a forager vulture bee eats is, upon return to the hive, regurgitated into a storage pot, where it will be further processed by worker bees.

== Meat honey ==
The vulture bee is sometimes said to produce a so-called "meat honey", but this is a misnomer resulting from scientific uncertainty, due to historic confusion of multiple species. Each species has a slightly different method of processing.

In one detailed study of Trigona hypogea in Brazil, the vulture bees mixed sugary plant products with a proteinaceous paste from regurgitated meat, and let it mature to form a sweet substance that was used as food; however, the two resources were initially kept in separate "pots" in the colony, neither being true honey (i.e., not derived from nectar), but they were then mixed together.

In a different study of Trigona necrophaga in Panama, the bees gathered nectar and produced honey, and they also produced a glandular secretion, derived from carrion, partially metabolized, used as a protein source, and kept completely separate from the honey. In neither case were the bees mixing meat-based substances with floral-derived substances.

This substance gives vulture bees a gut biome that helps turns the carrion into nutrients and protein needed for the bees' survival.

== Ecology and behavior ==
Vulture bees usually enter the carcass through the eyes. They will then root around inside gathering the carrion suitable for their needs. The vulture bee salivates on the rotting flesh, slices it off, and then consumes it, storing the flesh in its crop.

In Trigona necrophaga, when a forager returns to the nest, this masticated meat is regurgitated into a storage pot. The material is then consumed by a worker bee and processed by its highly-acidic gut, specialised to help break down the meat, before the bee then produces a special substance from its hypopharyngeal glands (the same gland used by honeybees to produce royal jelly), re-secreting the resulting proteins as a decay-resistant edible glucose product. The substance is rich and high in protein. These protein-rich secretions are then stored in pot-like containers within the nest, for about 14 days until it is time to feed the immature bees. The secretions replace the role of pollen in the bees' diet, as vulture bees lack adaptations for carrying pollen and pollen stores are absent from their nests.

In Trigona hypogea, when a forager returns to the nest, the regurgitated material derived from animal carcasses is deposited in special pots and later mixed with sugary plant products. They do not gather floral nectar or produce honey, but they do gather sugary secretions from fruit and non-floral sources (e.g., extrafloral nectaries), and at least initially regurgitate these into separate pots within the colony. After being mixed, the pots remain uncapped for about a day, and are then closed and allowed to mature for about two weeks. During this time the carrion-derived materials degrade into simple compounds used by the bees. The stored substance is initially paste-like, but it becomes a viscous fluid, and eventually becomes sweet and honey-like, homogeneous and yellowish.

Vulture bees go through the same stages of life and metamorphism as other bees. The Queen of the hive will mate with a single male to produce the eggs that the larvae will hatch from. If the queen were to take more than one mate, she would be killed. When the nest needs another queen, worker bees will create a brood cell for a larger larvae.

Vulture bees have been known to have hives in trees, underground, and even to take over abandoned termite nests. The nests are made of mud, wax resin, and animal products. The bees make comb structures like other bee species. Vulture bees have been known to be territorial, and will bite competitors and humans in the area.

In general, bees in the genus Trigona have been observed preying upon frog eggs. The genus also includes species known to have worker bees retain the ability to produce viable male eggs, such as Trigona spinipes (unless working in close proximity to the queen).

Vulture bees are considered scavengers, and contribute to the nitrogen cycling of their ecosystems. These bees have adapted from their vegetarian predecessors and have been a subject of study since their discovery.
