= Trigona hypogea =

Scientific classification
- Kingdom: Animalia
- Phylum: Arthropoda
- Class: Insecta
- Order: Hymenoptera
- Family: Apidae
- Tribe: Meliponini
- Genus: Trigona
- Species: T. hypogea

Binomial name
- Trigona hypogea Silvestri, 1902

Species of bee

Trigona hypogea is a species of stingless bee from the Neotropics; it is unusual in that it is one of only three known species of bee that exclusively uses carrion as a protein source, rather than pollen, earning it the nickname "vulture bee".

== Taxonomy ==
The earliest research into vulture bees was undertaken prior to the realization, in 1991, that there were three vulture bee species rather than one, and focused on Trigona necrophaga in Panama (e.g.). It was not until 1996 that a detailed study of genuine Trigona hypogea in Brazil was finally published.

== Biology ==
In Trigona hypogea, when a forager returns to the nest, the regurgitated material derived from animal carcasses is deposited in special pots and later mixed with sugary plant products; they do not gather nectar or produce honey, but they gather sugary secretions from fruit and non-floral sources (e.g., extrafloral nectaries), and at least initially regurgitate these into separate pots within the colony. After being mixed, the pots remain uncapped for about a day, and are then closed and allowed to mature for about two weeks. During this time the carrion-derived materials degrade into simple compounds used by the bees. The stored substance is initially paste-like, but it becomes a viscous fluid, and eventually becomes sweet and honey-like, homogeneous and yellowish. Earlier analyses of T. hypogea nests had incorrectly assumed that the pale sweet liquid found in the colonies was florally-derived honey.
