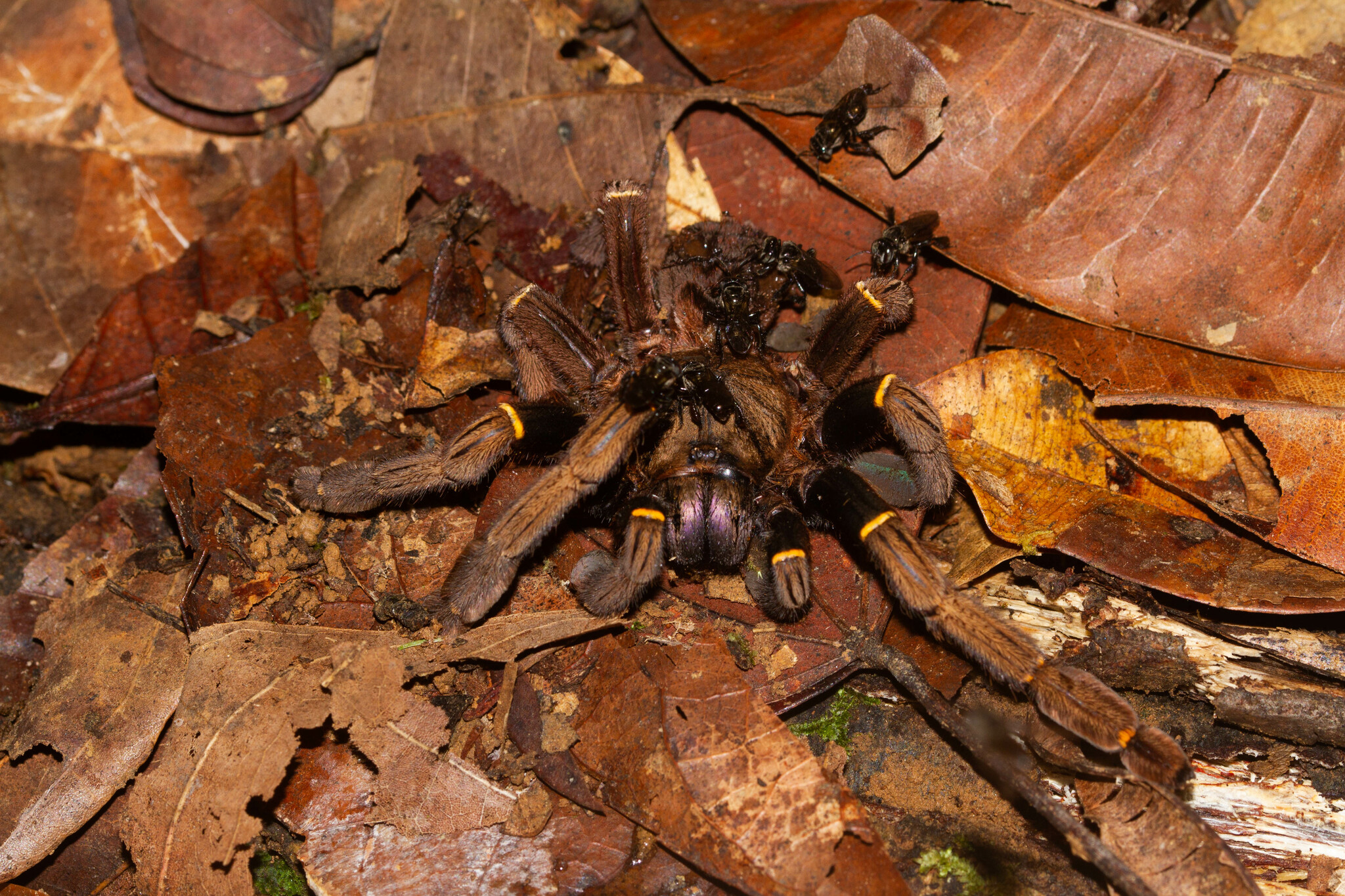
- Trigona crassipes feeding on Ephebopus cyanognathus

Scientific classification
- Kingdom: Animalia
- Phylum: Arthropoda
- Class: Insecta
- Order: Hymenoptera
- Family: Apidae
- Genus: Trigona
- Species: T. crassipes

Binomial name
- Trigona crassipes (Fabricius, 1793)

Synonyms
- Trigona hypogea robustior (Schwarz, 1940); Apis crassipes (Fabricius, 1793)

= Trigona crassipes =

Species of bee

Trigona crassipes is an obligately necrophagous bee found in Brazil (regions like Amazonas, Rio Ipixuna, and Purus), French Guiana, Suriname, British Guiana, Colombia, Peru, and Ecuador. This species is the largest out of all three vulture bee species.

== Morphology ==
Trigona crassipes are approximately 6.6 mm (0.26 in) long and are black with piligerous punctuation. Forewings are approximately 6 mm (0.24 in) long.

Compared to sister species Trigona hypogea, T. crassipes has fewer plumose hairs on the posterior border of the mesotibiae. Pilosity on the vertex is longer and denser.

The malar area is significantly larger than similar sister species Trigona necrophaga (up to 25% larger). The clypeus is slightly arched and elevated, with a length-to-width ratio of 1.7:1. The epistomal suture is slightly wavy and inclined at 30° from the longitudinal axis of the head. The supraclypeal area slightly protrudes more than the clypeus.

Male genitalia are similar to other Trigona species, particularly Trigona necrophaga. Setae on the fifth metasomal sternite are thick and diverge laterally.

In Trigona crassipes, workers possess tergal unicellular and epithelial glands, with the latter functioning as wax glands essential for nest construction. These glands vary in development across life stages and castes, with queens having more developed epithelial glands whose functions remain unclear, while males have tergal glands in one or two tergites, possibly related to communication or other behaviors.

== Ecology ==
Trigona crassipes has been observed foraging on fish baits on the eastern slope of the Peruvian Andes at elevations of 200–1,000 m (660–3,280 ft). The bees were only present during the wet season and were not found in adjacent higher elevation forests. In French Guiana, T. crassipes has been observed foraging on a dead oligochaete worm, excavating holes in the flesh in small groups. They were also frequently collected on a 40% sugar honey-water mixture sprayed on vegetation at the edges of undisturbed forests. In these areas, they sometimes recruited in large numbers (over 100 workers). Observations were only made during the wet season.

In Brazilian Amazonia, Trigona crassipes workers were observed visiting stinkhorn fungi (Dictyophora sp. and Phallus sp.), licking the mucilaginous mass of spores. No spores or gleba residue were found on their bodies, suggesting that these bees may occasionally include spores in their diet and potentially aid in spore dispersal by eliminating intact spores.

Adult populations of nests are large, with one nest recorded having 210,000 individuals. Some observations cite that workers at the nest entrance are highly aggressive, attacking intruders within 2 m by biting and depositing resin from their hind legs, as well as chasing intruders up to 30 m. However, a different nest observation reported only mild aggression when the nest was disturbed.

In the Amazon region, T. crassipes nests are prominent, typically found in dense forests of emergent trees at greater than 35 m (115 ft). Nests are observed 2–10 m (6 ft 7 in – 32 ft 10 in) above ground in living trees, with a few found in fallen trees. In some cases, nests share space with other stingless bee species, ants, and termites. Examples include a nest in Parkia trees, sharing space with T. williana, and another in a tree with 10 other stingless bee colonies, including T. pallens and Scaptotrigona species.

Nests contain little honey and no stored pollen. Some honey pots have been reported to have a yellowish, pasty substance; however, this is suspected to be contamination due to spores and few pollen grains. Larval provisions are whitish and contain no pollen grains. Entrance tubes are made of dark resin that is smooth on the inside and rough on the outside, varying from 6 to 27 cm (2.4 to 10.6 in) in length, and 5 to 8 cm (2.0 to 3.1 in) in diameter. Inside the nest is a labyrinth of cerumen pillars. Some nests possess a second opening, which may possibly be for waste disposal.

The nest cavity varies in size from 30 to 70 cm (12 to 28 in) in length, and 15 to 30 cm (5.9 to 11.8 in) in diameter, surrounded by thick batumen walls. It is lined with several sheaths of dark resin, forming labyrinths near the entrance. Brood and storage areas are supported by sticky resin pillars. There is no true involucrum around the brood, but combs are present and occupy two-thirds of the nest. There are approximately 30 brood combs in a nest, with a diameter of up to 15 cm (5.9 in) and separated by 4 mm (0.16 in). Worker brood cells are approximately 6.8 mm (0.27 in) high and 4.2 mm (0.17 in) in diameter; queen cells are approximately 11.6 mm (0.46 in) high and 8.8 mm (0.35 in) in diameter.

Nests contain multiple queen cells (recorded up to 132 in one nest), and mature, pigmented pupae can be found separated from the brood, attached to the cerumen pillars.
