= Blood worm =

Blood worm or bloodworm is an ambiguous term and can refer to:

- Larvae of a non-biting midge (family Chironomidae) containing hemoglobin
- Glycera (annelid), a polychaete often used for fishing bait
- Species of the Polychaeta subclass Scolecida
- Angiostrongylus cantonensis, a parasitic nematode that causes Angiostrongyliasis and the most common cause of eosinophilic meningitis
- Eisenia fetida, an earthworm adapted to decaying organic material
- Lumbriculus variegatus, more commonly called blackworm
- Strongylus vulgaris, a common horse parasite
