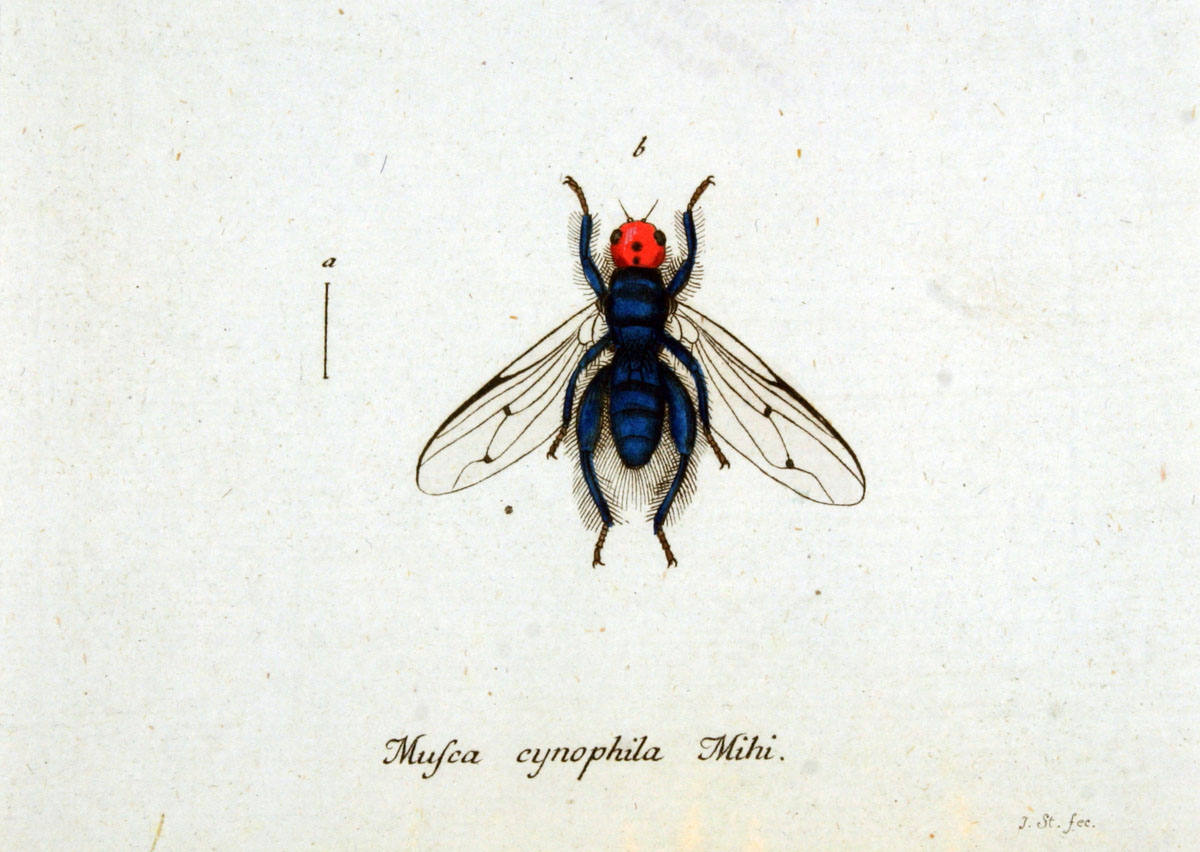
- Thyreophora cynophila (Plate by Jacob Sturm)

Scientific classification
- Kingdom: Animalia
- Phylum: Arthropoda
- Class: Insecta
- Order: Diptera
- Family: Piophilidae
- Subfamily: Thyreophorinae
- Genus: Thyreophora; Meigen, 1803
- Species: T. cynophila

Binomial name
- Thyreophora cynophila (Panzer, 1798)

Synonyms
- Musca cynophila Panzer, 1798

= Thyreophora cynophila =

Species of fly

Thyreophora cynophila, commonly known as the bone skipper is a species of necrophagous fly native to Europe. It was once thought to be the first fly to be driven to extinction by humans, but was rediscovered in 2009. It has a bright orange head, and is associated with animal carcasses where the bones are broken open. It is the only species in the genus Thyreophora.

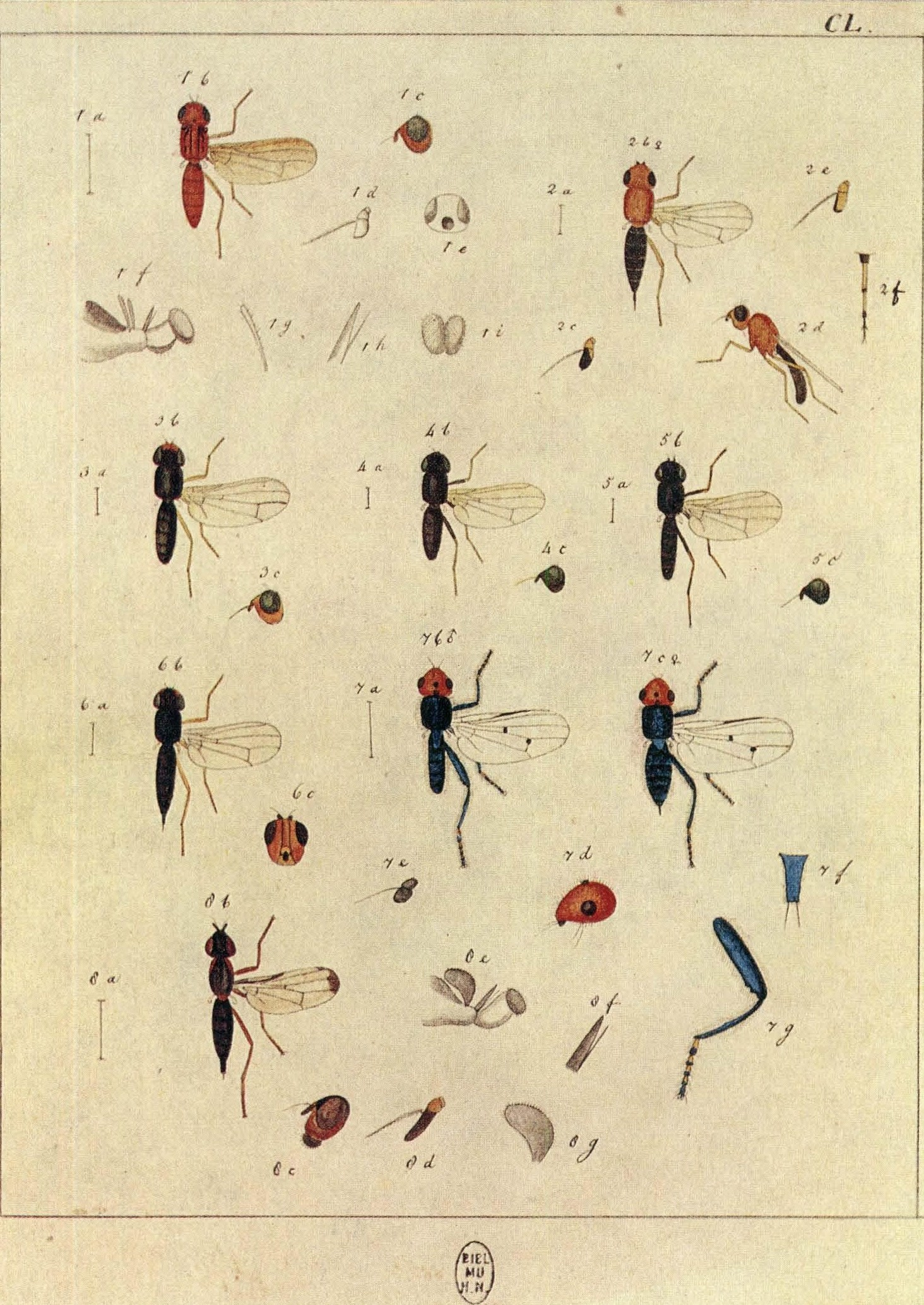
Meigen's figure (7 male, female, dissection) of Thyreophora cynophila in Europäischen Zweiflügeligen

== Description ==
Thyreophora cynophila was originally described by Georg Wolfgang Franz Panzer in 1798, under the name Musca cynophila. He described it in German as Hundefliege ("dog-fly"), having found it on the carcass of a dog in Mannheim. The animal is nearly 10 millimetres (0.39 in) long, and the head is bright orange in colour, while the body and legs are metallic blue; the wings bear a pair of black spots. In 1803, Johann Wilhelm Meigen transferred the species to a new genus, Thyreophora, which means "shield-bearer", in reference to the enlarged scutellum in the male. (The name Thyreophora is also used for a dinosaur suborder.) Later reports extended the species' geographical range to include France and Austria, and some reported that the fly had a luminous head.

== Extinction ==
The species was not recorded in the wild after 1850, and was long considered to be extinct. Reasons suggested for its disappearance include changes in livestock management, and the loss of predatory megafauna; in either case, the scarcity of large carcasses with partly crushed bones, which would allow the insects to reach the medullary cavity and the bone marrow, denied the fly its likely breeding habitat.

== Rediscovery ==
In late 2009, an amateur photographer took a photograph of a fly that he did not recognise in the Sierra de Cebollera Natural Park in La Rioja, Spain, and sought help in identifying from entomologists. After initially assuming that the species must be tropical, one of them realised the fly's identity. The team found live specimens at the same natural park in early 2010 and published their discovery in August 2010. The authors speculated that one reason the fly had gone unrecorded for 160 years is because it feeds on large rotting carcasses, mainly at night and in the winter; locations and times at which entomologists are unlikely to collect specimens. The species has been found on 11 different sites in the Iberian Mountains in La Rioja located between 900 and 1,400 m.a.s.l. covering an area of approximately 76,500 hectares.
