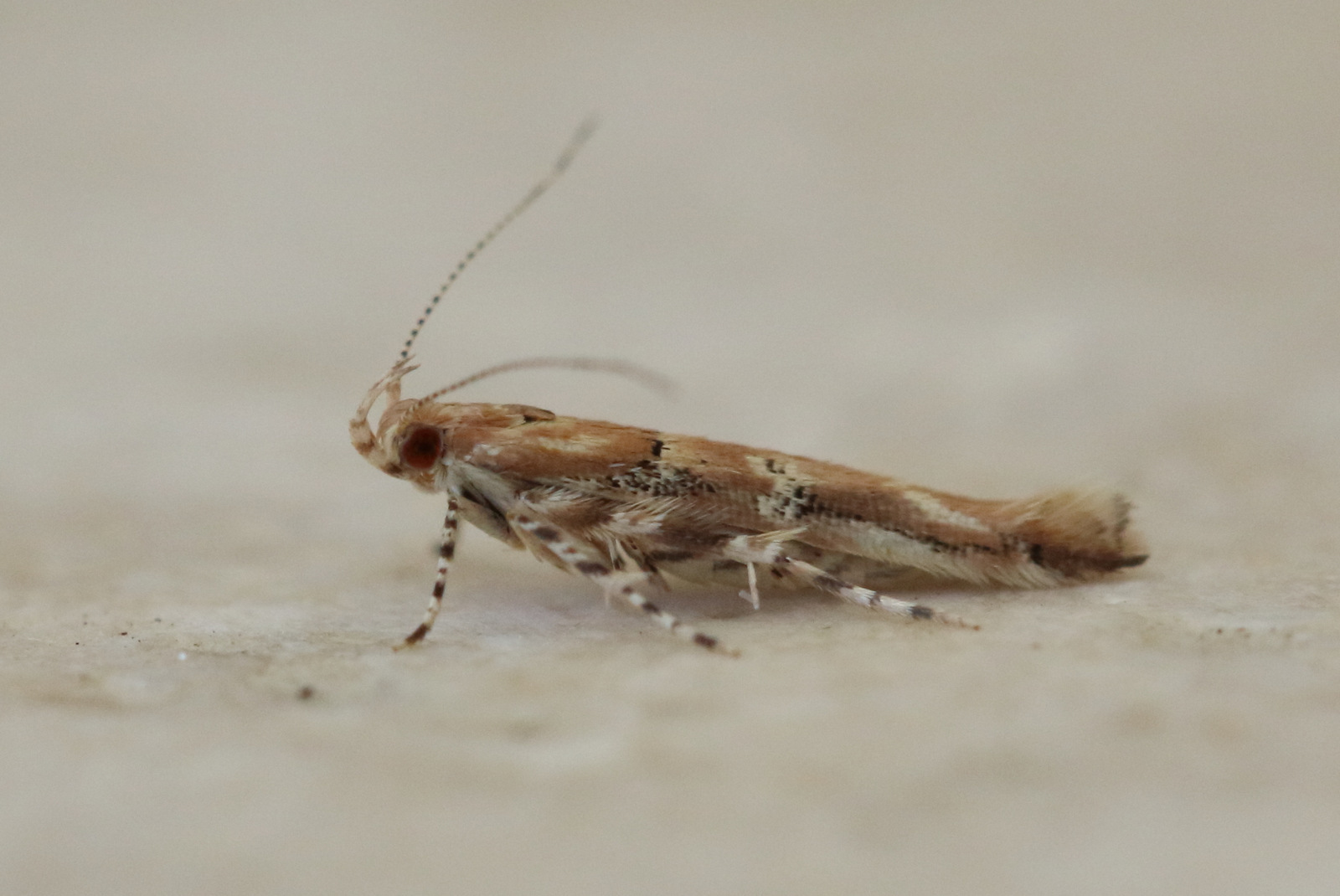
- An example of Anatrachyntis rileyi

Scientific classification
- Kingdom: Animalia
- Phylum: Arthropoda
- Class: Insecta
- Order: Lepidoptera
- Family: Cosmopterigidae
- Genus: Anatrachyntis
- Species: A. rileyi

Binomial name
- Anatrachyntis rileyi (Walsingham, 1882)

Synonyms
- Batrachedra rileyi Walsingham, 1882; Pyroderces rileyi; Sathrobrota rileyi; Batrachedra stigmatophora Walsingham, 1897; Pyroderces stigmatophora; Anatrachyntis stigmatophora

= Anatrachyntis rileyi =

Species of moth

Anatrachyntis rileyi, the pink cornworm, pink bud moth or pink scavenger, is a species of moth of the family Cosmopterigidae, the cosmet moths. It was first described by Lord Walsingham in 1882 from the southern United States, but it is probably an introduction to North America. It is found in much of the warm or tropical areas of the world, including northern Australia, the Galápagos Islands, Hawaii, the Antilles, South America and Mauritius.
