= Astyra (disambiguation) =

Astyra is a genus of amphipods.

Astyra may also refer to:

- Astyra (Aeolis), a town of ancient Aeolis near the Plain of Thebe
- Astyra (near Pergamon), a town of ancient Aeolis near Pergamon
- Astyra, alternate name of Astyria, a town of ancient Aeolis
- Astyra (Troad), a town of ancient Troad
