= Eurythenes obesus =

Scientific classification
- Domain: Eukaryota
- Kingdom: Animalia
- Phylum: Arthropoda
- Class: Malacostraca
- Order: Amphipoda
- Family: Eurytheneidae
- Genus: Eurythenes
- Species: E. obesus

Binomial name
- Eurythenes obesus (Chevreux, 1905)

Synonyms
- Alicella scotiae Chilton, 1912

Species of amphipod

Eurythenes obesus is a species of amphipod of the genus Eurythenes. It was first described in 1905 by Édouard Chevreux.

Eurythenes obesus is found most from the Caribbean to the Antarctic regions but can be found in most ocean basins. It can grow to over 60 mm (2.4 in) long and looks similar to Eurythenes gryllus.
