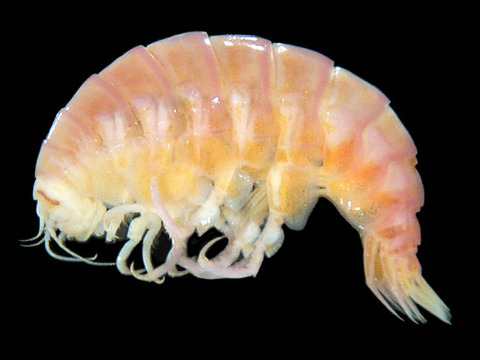

Scientific classification
- Kingdom: Animalia
- Phylum: Arthropoda
- Clade: Pancrustacea
- Class: Malacostraca
- Order: Amphipoda
- Family: Eurytheneidae
- Genus: Eurythenes; S. I. Smith in Scudder, 1882

= Eurythenes =

Genus of amphipods

Eurythenes is a genus of marine amphipods in the family Eurytheneidae.

== Species ==
- E. aequilatus Narahara-Nakano, Nakano & Tomikawa, 2017
- E. andhakarae d'Udekem d'Acoz & Havermans, 2015
- E. atacamensis Weston & Espinosa-Leal, 2021
- E. gryllus Lichtenstein in Mandt, 1822
- E. magellanicus H. Milne Edwards, 1848
- E. maldoror d'Udekem d'Acoz & Havermans, 2015
- E. obesus Chevreux, 1905
- E. plasticus Weston, 2020
- E. sigmiferus d'Udekem d'Acoz & Havermans, 2015
- E. thurstoni Stoddart & Lowry, 2004
