= Podoprion =

Scientific classification
- Kingdom: Animalia
- Phylum: Arthropoda
- Class: Malacostraca
- Order: Amphipoda
- Family: Podoprionidae; Lowry & Stoddart, 1996
- Genus: Podoprion; Chevreux, 1891

Genus of crustaceans

Podoprion is a genus of marine amphipods belonging to the family Podoprionidae. It is the only recognized genus in its family, although the Global Biodiversity Information Facility includes Coffsia as a taxonomically doubtful genus in Podoprionidae. Podoprion is known from the Indian and Atlantic Oceans and from the Mediterranean Sea.

== Species ==
There are four recognized species in this genus:

- Podoprion addyi Horton, 2005
- Podoprion bolivari Chevreux, 1891
- Podoprion mediterraneum Kaim-Malka, 2004
- Podoprion ruffoi Lowry & Stoddart, 1996
