= Stilipedidae =

Scientific classification
- Kingdom: Animalia
- Phylum: Arthropoda
- Clade: Pancrustacea
- Class: Malacostraca
- Order: Amphipoda
- Parvorder: Amphilochidira
- Superfamily: Iphimedioidea
- Family: Stilipedidae; Holmes, 1908

Genera
- See text.

Family of crustaceans

Stilipedidae is a family of amphipods, consisting of 3 subfamilies and 4 genera:

- Alexandrellinae Holman & Watling, 1983
  - Alexandrella Chevreux, 1911
- Astryrinae Pirlot, 1934
  - Astyra Boeck, 1871
  - Eclysis K.H. Bernard, 1932
- Stilipedinae Holmes, 1908
  - Stilipes Holmes, 1908
