= Marine habitat =

Habitat that supports marine life

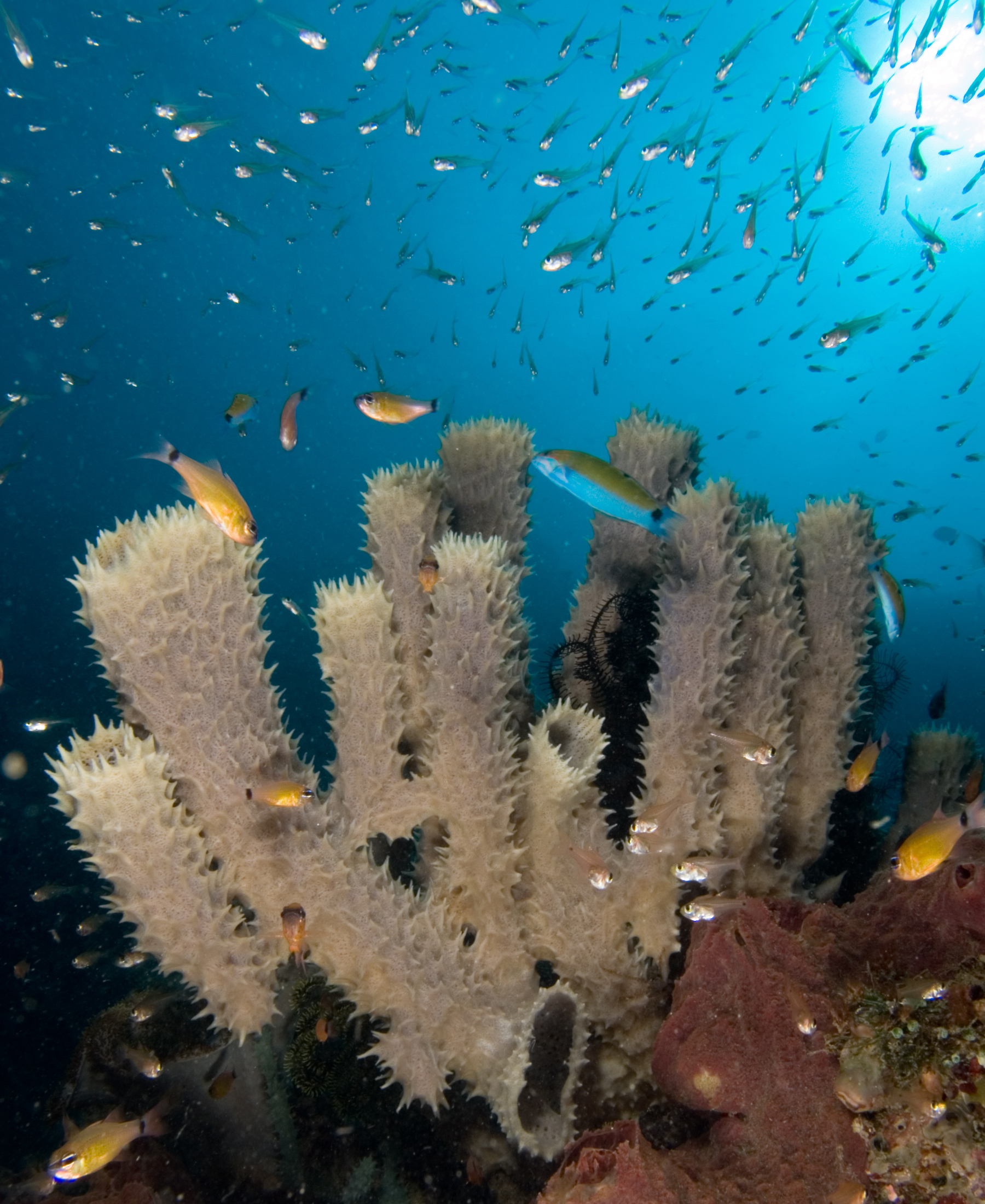
Coral reefs provide marine habitats for tube sponges, which in turn become marine habitats for fishes

A marine habitat is a habitat that supports marine life. Marine life depends in some way on the saltwater that is in the sea (the term marine comes from the Latin mare, meaning sea or ocean). A habitat is an ecological or environmental area inhabited by one or more living species. The marine environment supports many kinds of these habitats.

Marine habitats can be divided into coastal and open ocean habitats. Coastal habitats are found in the area that extends from as far as the tide comes in on the shoreline out to the edge of the continental shelf. Most marine life is found in coastal habitats, even though the shelf area occupies only seven percent of the total ocean area. Open ocean habitats are found in the deep ocean beyond the edge of the continental shelf.

Alternatively, marine habitats can be divided into pelagic and demersal zones. Pelagic habitats are found near the surface or in the open water column, away from the bottom of the ocean. Demersal habitats are near or on the bottom of the ocean. An organism living in a pelagic habitat is said to be a pelagic organism, as in pelagic fish. Similarly, an organism living in a demersal habitat is said to be a demersal organism, as in demersal fish. Pelagic habitats are intrinsically shifting and ephemeral, depending on what ocean currents are doing.

Marine habitats can be modified by their inhabitants. Some marine organisms, like corals, kelp, mangroves and seagrasses, are ecosystem engineers which reshape the marine environment to the point where they create further habitat for other organisms. By volume the ocean provides most of the habitable space on the planet.

== Overview ==
In contrast to terrestrial habitats, marine habitats are shifting and ephemeral. Swimming organisms find areas by the edge of a continental shelf a good habitat, but only while upwellings bring nutrient rich water to the surface. Shellfish find habitat on sandy beaches, but storms, tides and currents mean their habitat continually reinvents itself.

The presence of seawater is common to all marine habitats. Beyond that many other things determine whether a marine area makes a good habitat and the type of habitat it makes. For example:

- temperature – is affected by geographical latitude, ocean currents, weather, the discharge of rivers, and by the presence of hydrothermal vents or cold seeps
- sunlight – photosynthetic processes depend on how deep and turbid the water is
- nutrients – are transported by ocean currents to different marine habitats from land runoff, or by upwellings from the deep sea, or they sink through the sea as marine snow
- salinity – varies, particularly in estuaries or near river deltas, or by hydrothermal vents
- dissolved gases – oxygen levels in particular, can be increased by wave actions and decreased during algal blooms
- acidity – this is partly to do with dissolved gases above, since the acidity of the ocean is largely controlled by how much carbon dioxide is in the water.
- turbulence – ocean waves, fast currents and the agitation of water affect the nature of habitats
- cover – the availability of cover such as the adjacency of the sea bottom, or the presence of floating objects
- substrate – The slope, orientation, profile and rugosity of hard substrates, and particle size, sorting and density of unconsolidated sediment bottoms can make a big difference to the life forms that can settle on it.
- the occupying organisms themselves – since organisms modify their habitats by the act of occupying them, and some, like corals, kelp, mangroves and seagrasses, create further habitats for other organisms.

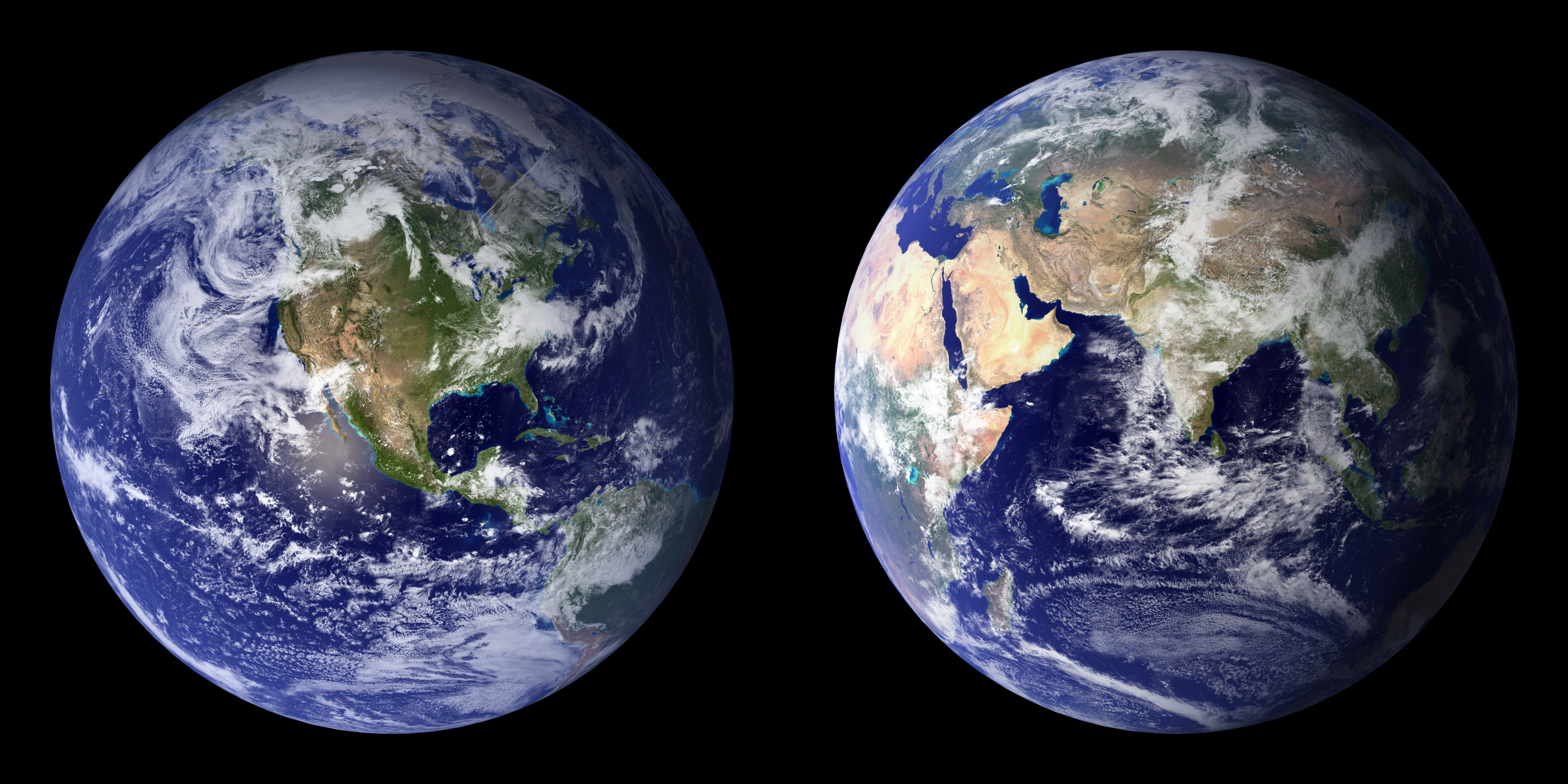
Only 29 percent of the world surface is land. The rest is ocean, home to the marine habitats. The oceans are nearly four kilometres deep on average and are fringed with coastlines that run for nearly 380,000 kilometres.

There are five major oceans, of which the Pacific Ocean is nearly as large as the rest put together. Coastlines fringe the land for nearly 380,000 kilometres.

Ocean	Area million km^{2}	%	Volume million cu km	%	Mean depth km	Max depth km	Coastline km	%	Ref
Pacific Ocean	155.6	46.4	679.6	49.6	4.37	10.924	135,663		
Atlantic Ocean	76.8	22.9	313.4	22.5	4.08	8.605	111,866		
Indian Ocean	68.6	20.4	269.3	19.6	3.93	7.258	66,526		
Southern Ocean	20.3	6.1	91.5	6.7	4.51	7.235	17,968		
Arctic Ocean	14.1	4.2	17.0	1.2	1.21	4.665	45,389		
Overall	335.3		1370.8		4.09	10.924	377,412		

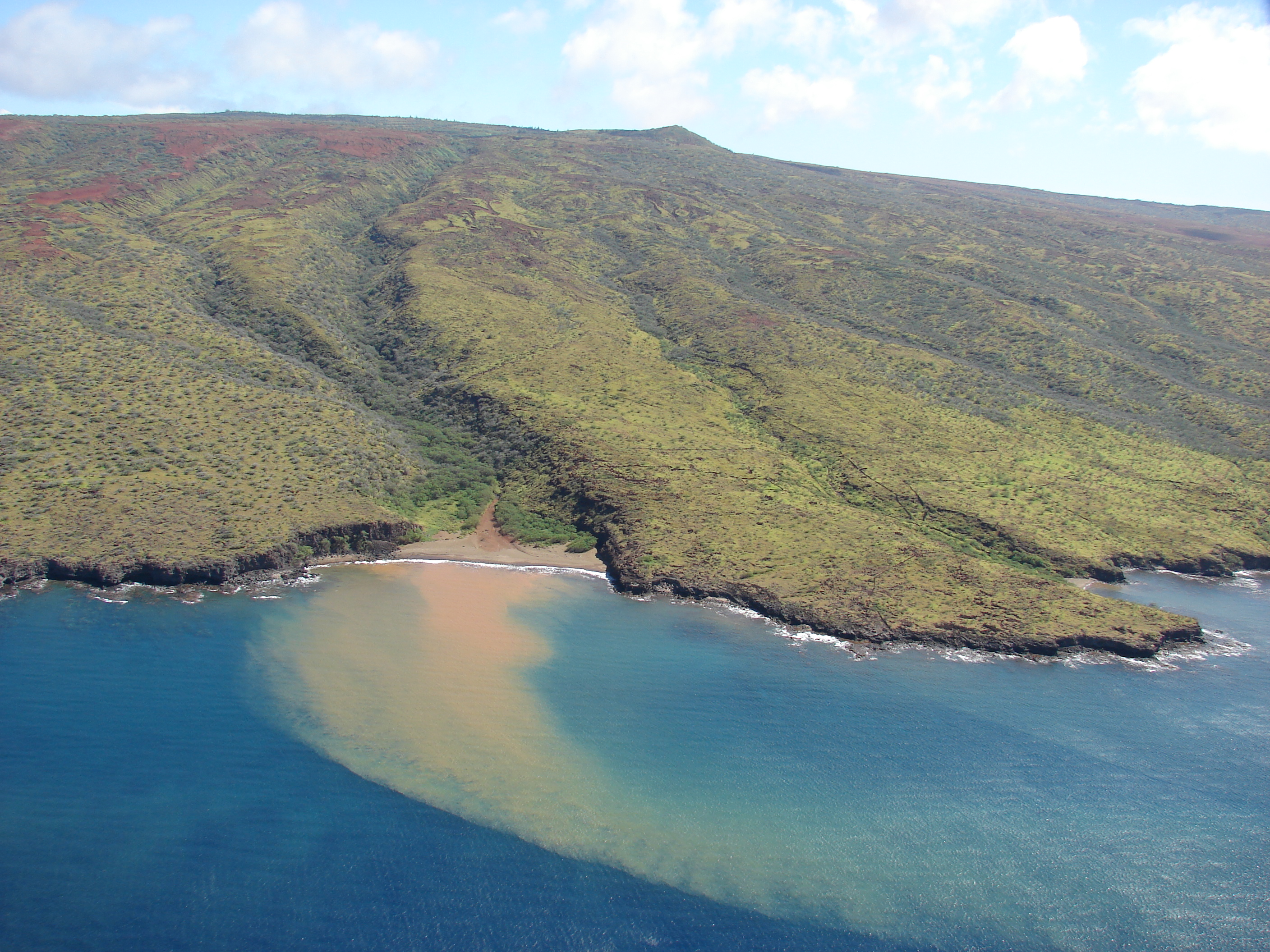
Land runoff, pouring into the sea, can contain nutrients

Altogether, the ocean occupies 71 percent of the world surface, averaging nearly four kilometres in depth. By volume, the ocean contains more than 99 percent of the Earth's liquid water. The science fiction writer Arthur C. Clarke has pointed out it would be more appropriate to refer to the planet Earth as the planet Sea or the planet Ocean.

Marine habitats can be broadly divided into pelagic and demersal habitats. Pelagic habitats are the habitats of the open water column, away from the bottom of the ocean. Demersal habitats are the habitats that are near or on the bottom of the ocean. An organism living in a pelagic habitat is said to be a pelagic organism, as in pelagic fish. Similarly, an organism living in a demersal habitat is said to be a demersal organism, as in demersal fish. Pelagic habitats are intrinsically ephemeral, depending on what ocean currents are doing.

The land-based ecosystem depends on topsoil and fresh water, while the marine ecosystem depends on dissolved nutrients washed down from the land.

Ocean deoxygenation poses a threat to marine habitats, due to the growth of low oxygen zones.

== Ocean currents ==
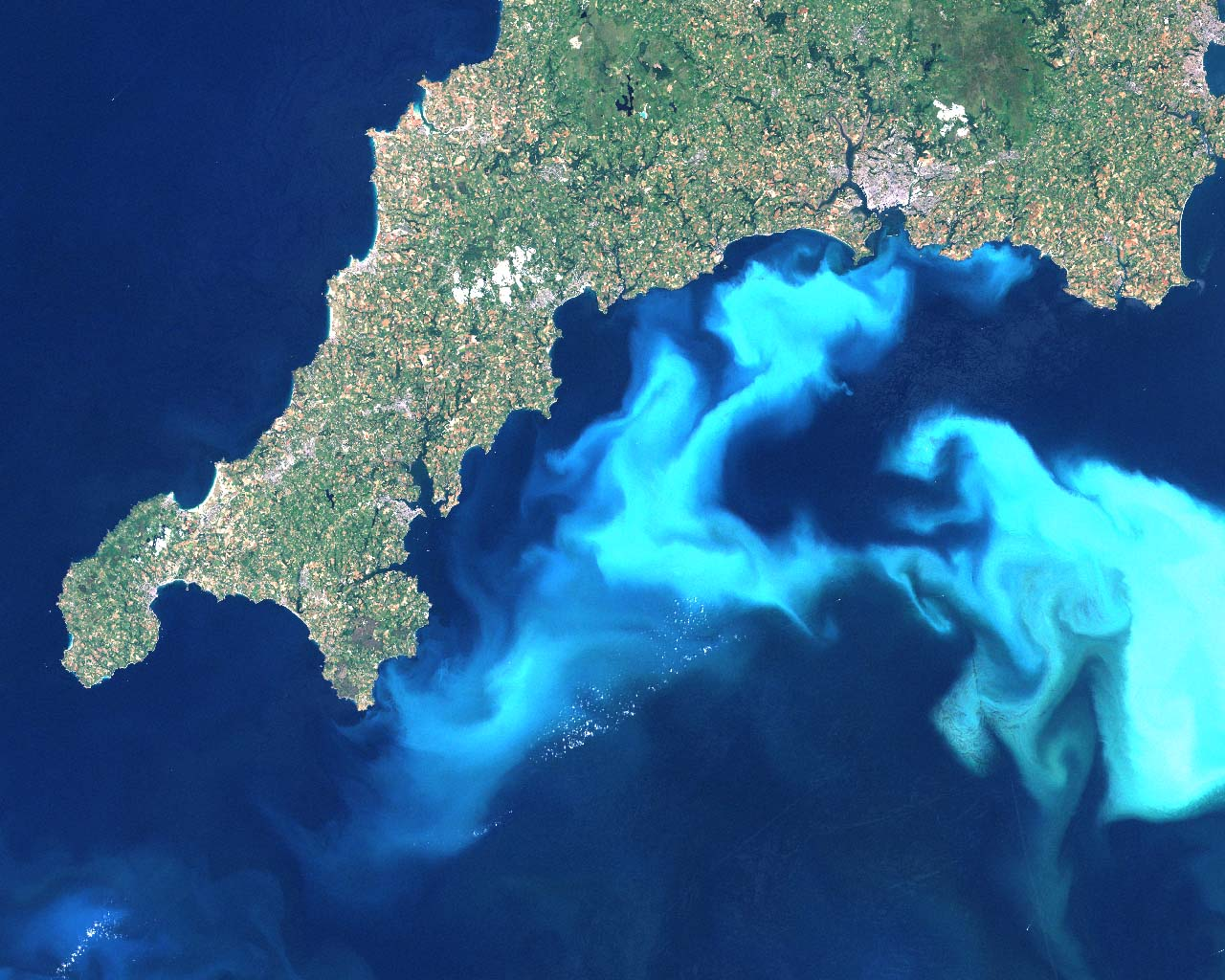
This algae bloom occupies sunlit epipelagic waters off the southern coast of England. The algae are maybe feeding on nutrients from land runoff or upwellings at the edge of the continental shelf.

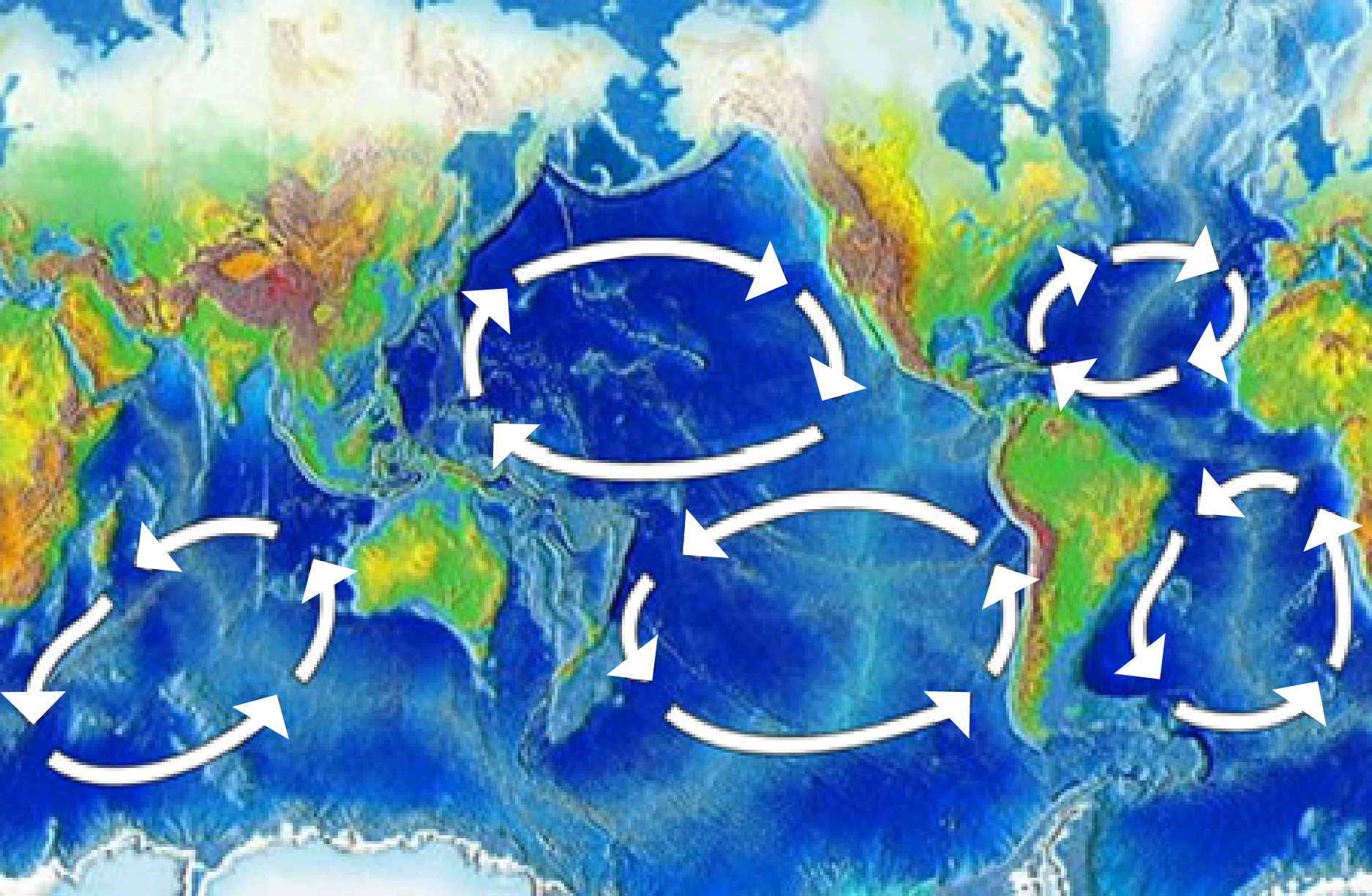
Ocean gyres rotate clockwise in the north and counterclockwise in the south

In marine systems, ocean currents have a key role determining which areas are effective as habitats, since ocean currents transport the basic nutrients needed to support marine life. Plankton are the life forms that inhabit the ocean that are so small (less than 2 mm) that they cannot effectively propel themselves through the water, but must drift instead with the currents. If the current carries the right nutrients, and if it also flows at a suitably shallow depth where there is plenty of sunlight, then such a current itself can become a suitable habitat for photosynthesizing tiny algae called phytoplankton. These tiny plants are the primary producers in the ocean, at the start of the food chain. In turn, as the population of drifting phytoplankton grows, the water becomes a suitable habitat for zooplankton, which feed on the phytoplankton. While phytoplankton are tiny drifting plants, zooplankton are tiny drifting animals, such as the larvae of fish and marine invertebrates. If sufficient zooplankton establish themselves, the current becomes a candidate habitat for the forage fish that feed on them. And then if sufficient forage fish move to the area, it becomes a candidate habitat for larger predatory fish and other marine animals that feed on the forage fish. In this dynamic way, the current itself can, over time, become a moving habitat for multiple types of marine life.

Ocean currents can be generated by differences in the density of the water. How dense water is depends on how saline or warm it is. If water contains differences in salt content or temperature, then the different densities will initiate a current. Water that is saltier or cooler will be denser, and will sink in relation to the surrounding water. Conversely, warmer and less salty water will float to the surface. Atmospheric winds and pressure differences also produces surface currents, waves and seiches. Ocean currents are also generated by the gravitational pull of the sun and moon (tides), and seismic activity (tsunami).

The rotation of the Earth affects the direction ocean currents take, and explains which way the large circular ocean gyres rotate in the image above left. Suppose a current at the equator is heading north. The Earth rotates eastward, so the water possesses that rotational momentum. But the further the water moves north, the slower the earth moves eastward. If the current could get to the North Pole, the earth would not be moving eastward at all. To conserve its rotational momentum, the further the current travels north the faster it must move eastward. So the effect is that the current curves to the right. This is the Coriolis effect. It is weakest at the equator and strongest at the poles. The effect is opposite south of the equator, where currents curve left.

== Topography ==
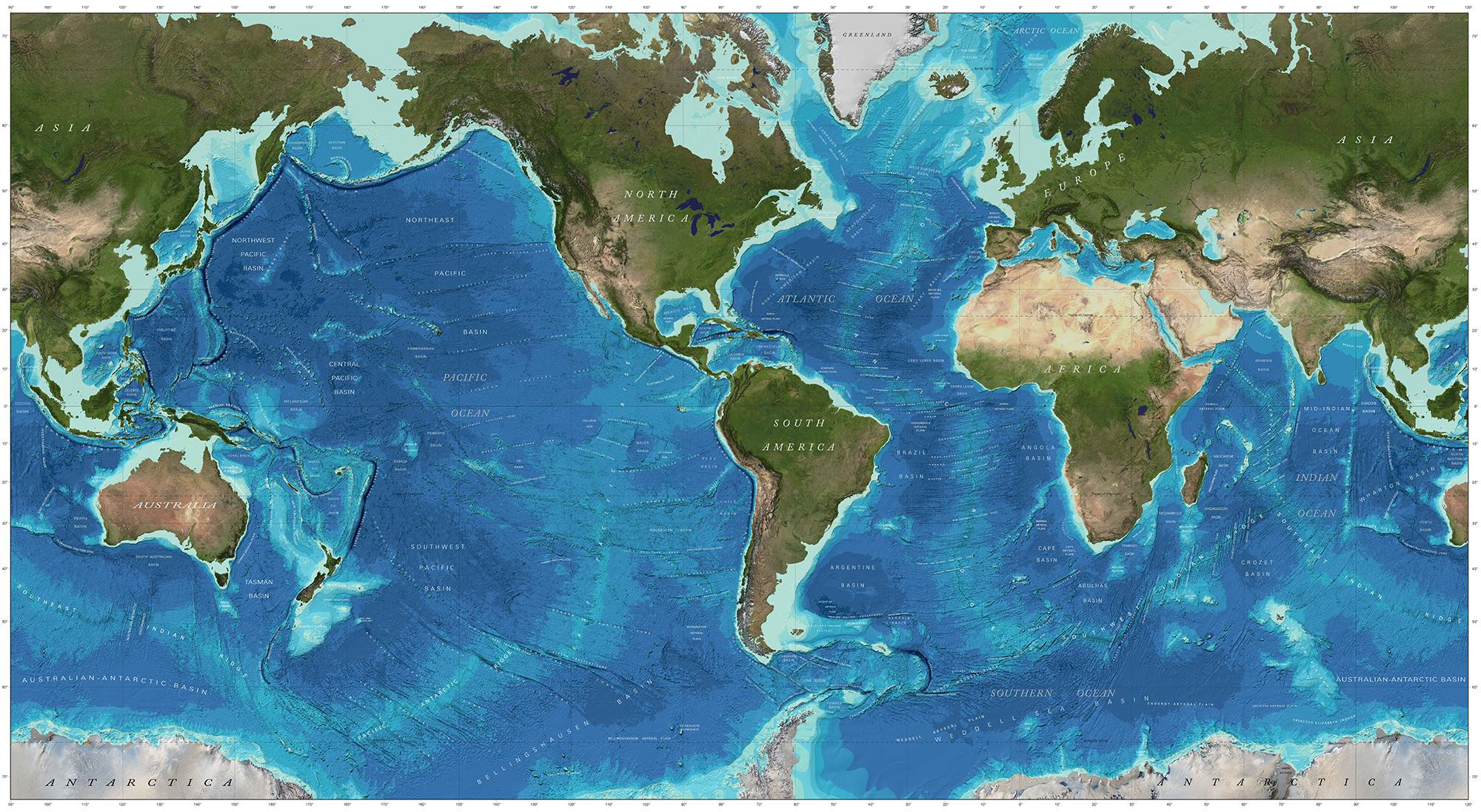
World map with ocean topography

Seabed topography (ocean topography or marine topography) refers to the shape of the land (topography) when it interfaces with the ocean. These shapes are obvious along coastlines, but they occur also in significant ways underwater. The effectiveness of marine habitats is partially defined by these shapes, including the way they interact with and shape ocean currents, and the way sunlight diminishes when these landforms occupy increasing depths. Tidal networks depend on the balance between sedimentary processes and hydrodynamics however, anthropogenic influences can impact the natural system more than any physical driver.

Marine topographies include coastal and oceanic landforms ranging from coastal estuaries and shorelines to continental shelves and coral reefs. Further out in the open ocean, they include underwater and deep sea features such as ocean rises and seamounts. The submerged surface has mountainous features, including a globe-spanning mid-ocean ridge system, as well as undersea volcanoes, oceanic trenches, submarine canyons, oceanic plateaus and abyssal plains.

The mass of the oceans is approximately 1.35×10^{18} metric tons, or about 1/4400 of the total mass of the Earth. The oceans cover an area of 3.618×10^{8} km^{2} with a mean depth of 3,682 m, resulting in an estimated volume of 1.332×10^{9} km^{3}.

Depth Range (meters)	Seafloor Area (km^{2})	Seafloor Percentage
0 – 200	26,402,000	7.30%
201 – 1000	15,848,000	4.38%
1001 – 4000	127,423,000	35.22%
4001 – 6000	188,395,000	52.08%
6001 – 7000	3,207,000	0.89%
7001 – 8000	320,000	0.09%
8001 – 9000	111,000	0.03%
9000 – 10,000	37,000	0.01%
10,000 +	2,000	< 0.01%

== Biomass ==
One measure of the relative importance of different marine habitats is the rate at which they produce biomass.

Producer	Biomass productivity (gC/m^{2}/yr)	Ref	Total area (million km^{2})	Ref	Total production (billion tonnes C/yr)	Comment
swamps and marshes	2,500					Includes freshwater
coral reefs	2,000		0.28		0.56	
algal beds	2,000					
river estuaries	1,800					
open ocean	125		311		39	

== Coastal ==
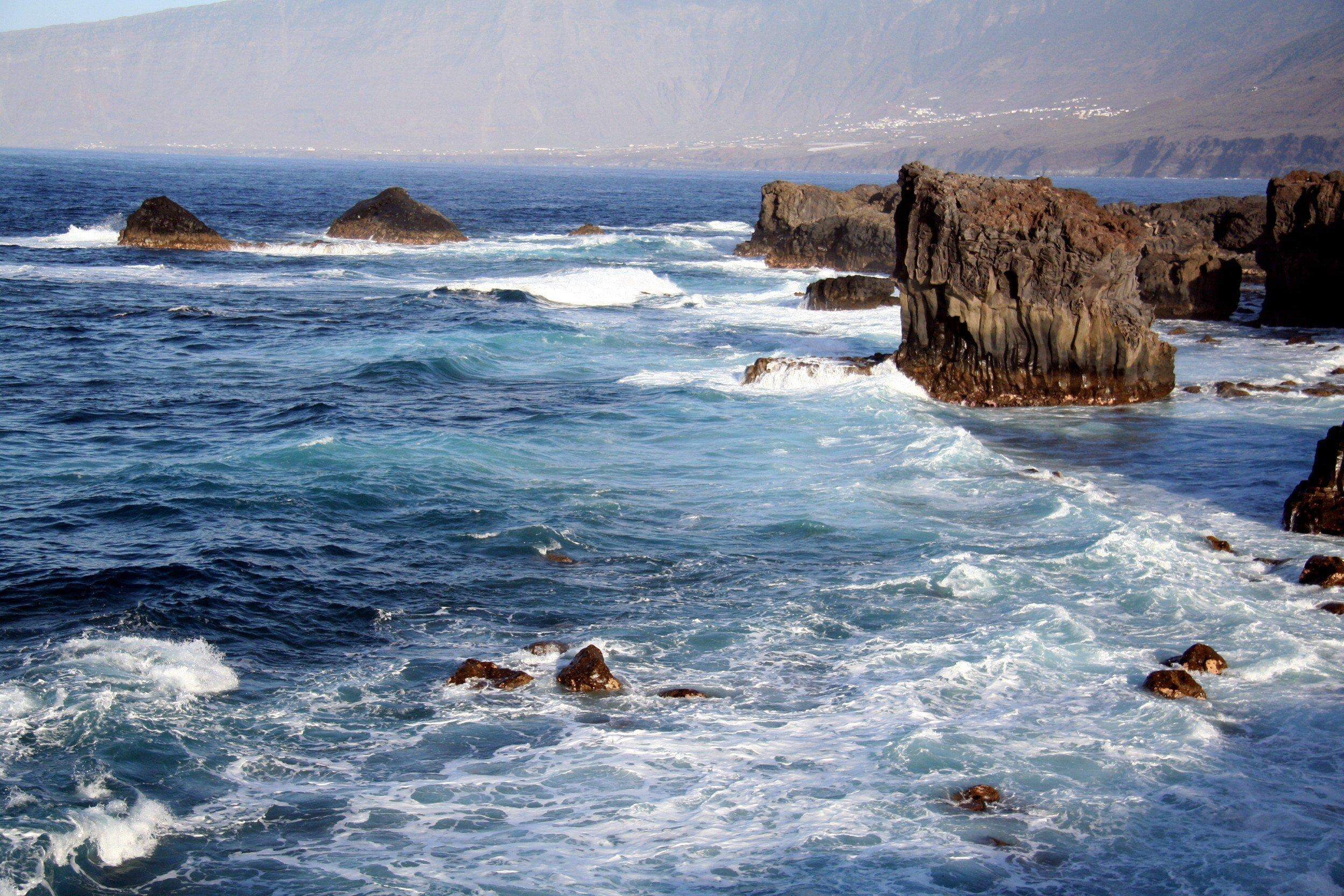
Coastlines can be volatile habitats

Marine coasts are dynamic environments which constantly change, like the ocean which partially shape them. The Earth's natural processes, including weather and sea level change, result in the erosion, accretion and resculpturing of coasts as well as the flooding and creation of continental shelves and drowned river valleys.

The main agents responsible for deposition and erosion along coastlines are waves, tides and currents. The formation of coasts also depends on the nature of the rocks they are made of – the harder the rocks the less likely they are to erode, so variations in rock hardness result in coastlines with different shapes.

Tides often determine the range over which sediment is deposited or eroded. Areas with high tidal ranges allow waves to reach farther up the shore, and areas with lower tidal ranges produce deposition at a smaller elevation interval. The tidal range is influenced by the size and shape of the coastline. Tides do not typically cause erosion by themselves; however, tidal bores can erode as the waves surge up river estuaries from the ocean.

Shores that look permanent through the short perceptive of a human lifetime are in fact among the most temporary of all marine structures.

Waves erode coastline as they break on shore releasing their energy; the larger the wave the more energy it releases and the more sediment it moves. Sediment deposited by waves comes from eroded cliff faces and is moved along the coastline by the waves. Sediment deposited by rivers is the dominant influence on the amount of sediment located on a coastline.

The sedimentologist Francis Shepard classified coasts as primary or secondary.

- Primary coasts are shaped by non-marine processes, by changes in the land form. If a coast is in much the same condition as it was when sea level was stabilised after the last ice age, it is called a primary coast. "Primary coasts are created by erosion (the wearing away of soil or rock), deposition (the buildup of sediment or sand) or tectonic activity (changes in the structure of the rock and soil because of earthquakes). Many of these coastlines were formed as the sea level rose during the last 18,000 years, submerging river and glacial valleys to form bays and fjords." An example of a primary coast is a river delta, which forms when a river deposits soil and other material as it enters the sea.
- Secondary coasts are produced by marine processes, such as the action of the sea or by creatures that live in it. Secondary coastlines include sea cliffs, barrier islands, mud flats, coral reefs, mangrove swamps and salt marshes.

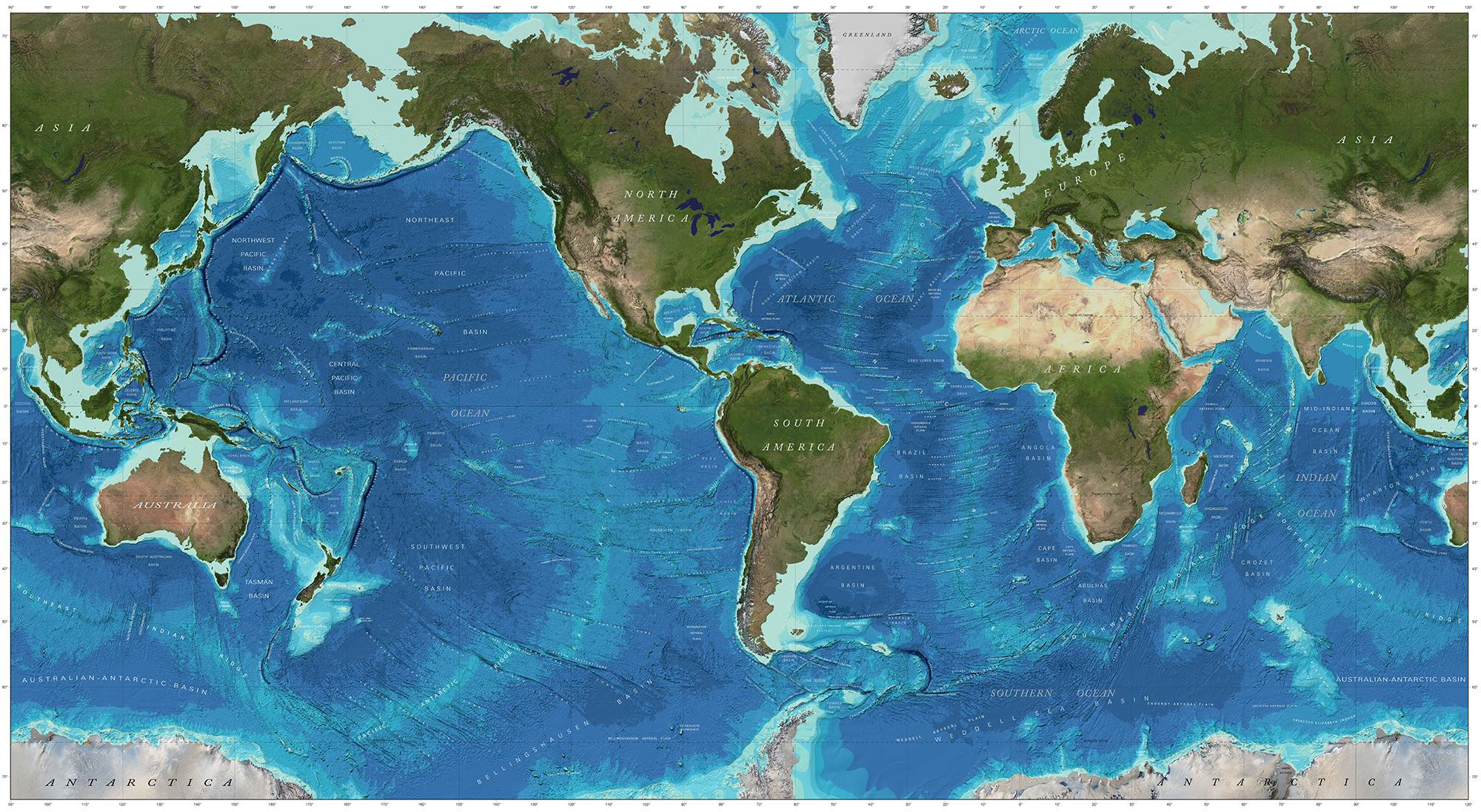
The global continental shelf, highlighted in light green, defines the extent of marine coastal habitats, and occupies 5% of the total world area

Continental coastlines usually have a continental shelf, a shelf of relatively shallow water, less than 200 metres deep, which extends 68 km on average beyond the coast. Worldwide, continental shelves occupy a total area of about 24 million km^{2} (9 million sq mi), 8% of the ocean's total area and nearly 5% of the world's total area. Since the continental shelf is usually less than 200 metres deep, it follows that coastal habitats are generally photic, situated in the sunlit epipelagic zone. This means the conditions for photosynthetic processes so important for primary production, are available to coastal marine habitats. Because land is nearby, there are large discharges of nutrient rich land runoff into coastal waters. Further, periodic upwellings from the deep ocean can provide cool and nutrient rich currents along the edge of the continental shelf.

As a result, coastal marine life is the most abundant in the world. It is found in tidal pools, fjords and estuaries, near sandy shores and rocky coastlines, around coral reefs and on or above the continental shelf. Coastal fish include small forage fish as well as the larger predator fish that feed on them. Forage fish thrive in inshore waters where high productivity results from upwelling and shoreline run off of nutrients. Some are partial residents that spawn in streams, estuaries and bays, but most complete their life cycle in the zone. There can also be a mutualism between species that occupy adjacent marine habitats. For example, fringing reefs just below low tide level have a mutually beneficial relationship with mangrove forests at high tide level and sea grass meadows in between: the reefs protect the mangroves and seagrass from strong currents and waves that would damage them or erode the sediments in which they are rooted, while the mangroves and seagrass protect the coral from large influxes of silt, fresh water and pollutants. This additional level of variety in the environment is beneficial to many types of coral reef animals, which for example may feed in the sea grass and use the reefs for protection or breeding.

Coastal habitats are the most visible marine habitats, but they are not the only important marine habitats. Coastlines run for 380,000 kilometres, and the total volume of the ocean is 1,370 million cu km. This means that for each metre of coast, there is 3.6 cu km of ocean space available somewhere for marine habitats.

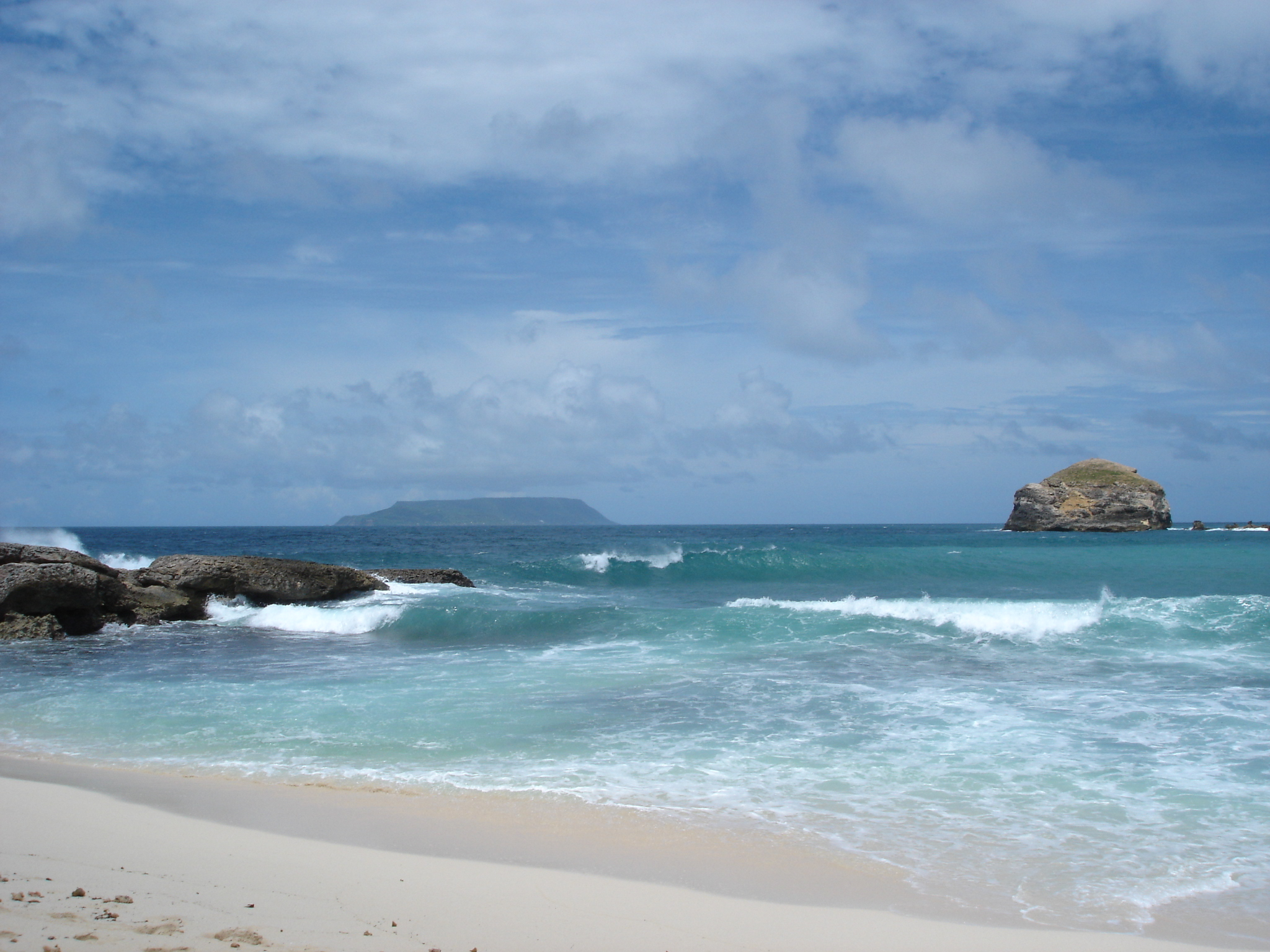
Waves and currents shape the intertidal shoreline, eroding the softer rocks and transporting and grading loose particles into shingles, sand or mud

=== Intertidal ===
Intertidal zones, those areas close to shore, are constantly being exposed and covered by the ocean's tides. A huge array of life lives within this zone.

Shore habitats range from the upper intertidal zones to the area where land vegetation takes prominence. It can be underwater anywhere from daily to very infrequently. Many species here are scavengers, living off of sea life that is washed up on the shore. Many land animals also make much use of the shore and intertidal habitats. A subgroup of organisms in this habitat bores and grinds exposed rock through the process of bioerosion.

=== Sandy shores ===
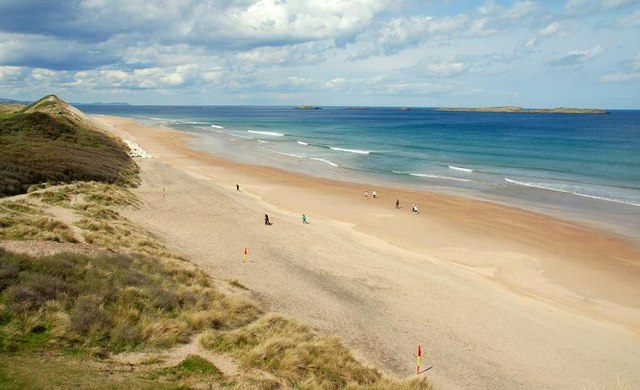
Sandy shores provide shifting homes to many species

Sandy shores, also called beaches, are coastal shorelines where sand accumulates. Waves and currents shift the sand, continually building and eroding the shoreline. Longshore currents flow parallel to the beaches, making waves break obliquely on the sand. These currents transport large amounts of sand along coasts, forming spits, barrier islands and tombolos. Longshore currents also commonly create offshore bars, which give beaches some stability by reducing erosion.

Sandy shores are full of life. The grains of sand host diatoms, bacteria and other microscopic creatures. Some fish and turtles return to certain beaches and spawn eggs in the sand. Birds habitat beaches, like gulls, loons, sandpipers, terns and pelicans. Aquatic mammals, such sea lions, recuperate on them. Clams, periwinkles, crabs, shrimp, starfish and sea urchins are found on most beaches.

Sand is a sediment made from small grains or particles with diameters between about 60 μm and 2 mm. Mud (see mudflats below) is a sediment made from particles finer than sand. This small particle size means that mud particles tend to stick together, whereas sand particles do not. Mud is not easily shifted by waves and currents, and when it dries out, cakes into a solid. By contrast, sand is easily shifted by waves and currents, and when sand dries out it can be blown in the wind, accumulating into shifting sand dunes. Beyond the high tide mark, if the beach is low-lying, the wind can form rolling hills of sand dunes. Small dunes shift and reshape under the influence of the wind while larger dunes stabilise the sand with vegetation.

Ocean processes grade loose sediments to particle sizes other than sand, such as gravel or cobbles. Waves breaking on a beach can leave a berm, which is a raised ridge of coarser pebbles or sand, at the high tide mark. Shingle beaches are made of particles larger than sand, such as cobbles, or small stones. These beaches make poor habitats. Little life survives because the stones are churned and pounded together by waves and currents.

=== Rocky shores ===
Tidepools on rocky shores make turbulent habitats for many forms of marine life

The relative solidity of rocky shores seems to give them a permanence compared to the shifting nature of sandy shores. This apparent stability is not real over even quite short geological time scales, but it is real enough over the short life of an organism. In contrast to sandy shores, plants and animals can anchor themselves to the rocks.

Competition can develop for the rocky spaces. For example, barnacles can compete successfully on open intertidal rock faces to the point where the rock surface is covered with them. Barnacles resist desiccation and grip well to exposed rock faces. However, in the crevices of the same rocks, the inhabitants are different. Here mussels can be the successful species, secured to the rock with their byssal threads.

Rocky and sandy coasts are vulnerable because humans find them attractive and want to live near them. An increasing proportion of the humans live by the coast, putting pressure on coastal habitats.

=== Mudflats ===
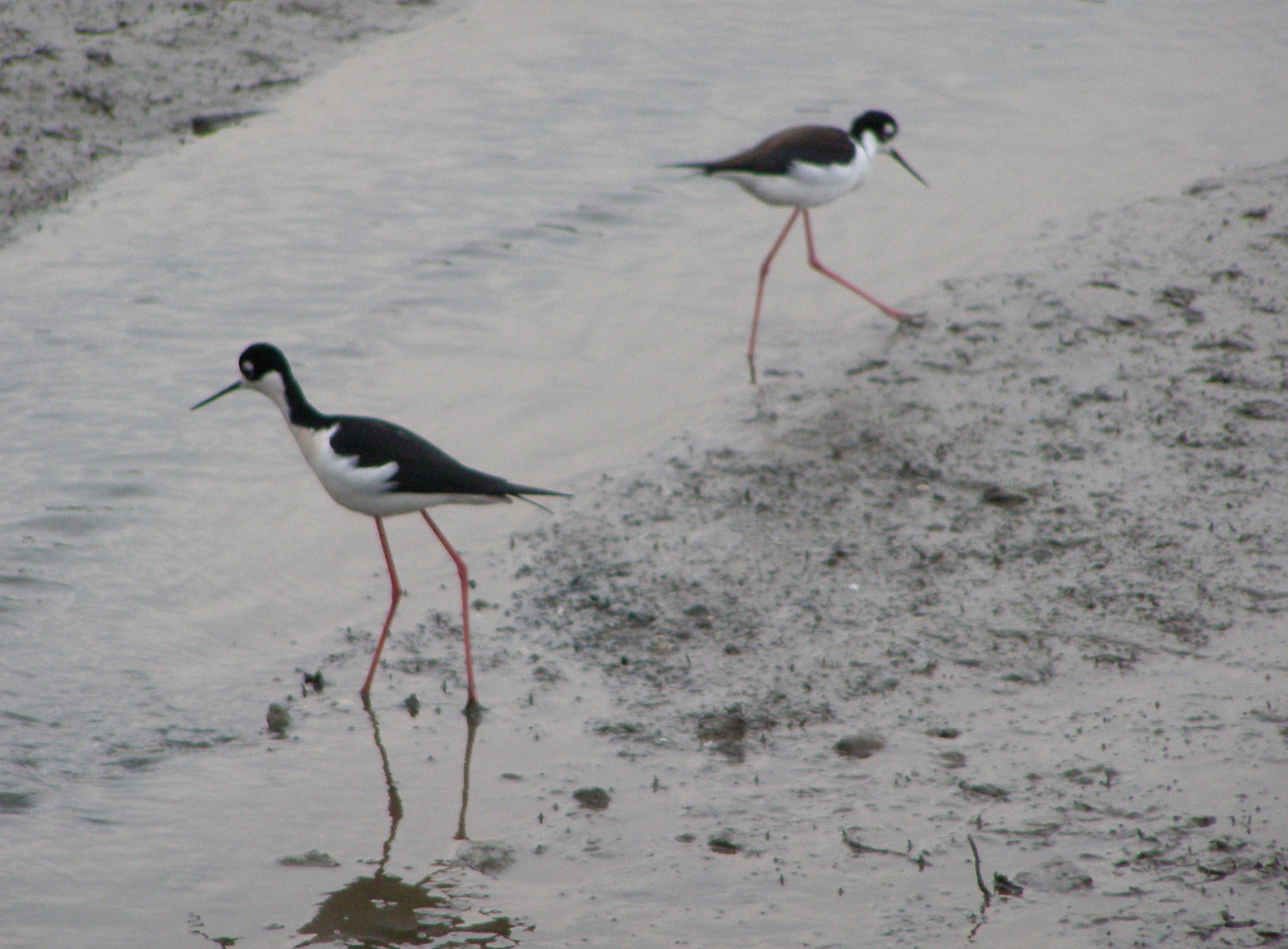
Mudflats become temporary habitats for migrating birds

Mudflats are coastal wetlands that form when mud is deposited by tides or rivers. They are found in sheltered areas such as bays, bayous, lagoons, and estuaries. Mudflats may be viewed geologically as exposed layers of bay mud, resulting from deposition of estuarine silts, clays and marine animal detritus. Most of the sediment within a mudflat is within the intertidal zone, and thus the flat is submerged and exposed approximately twice daily.

=== Mangrove forests and salt marshes ===
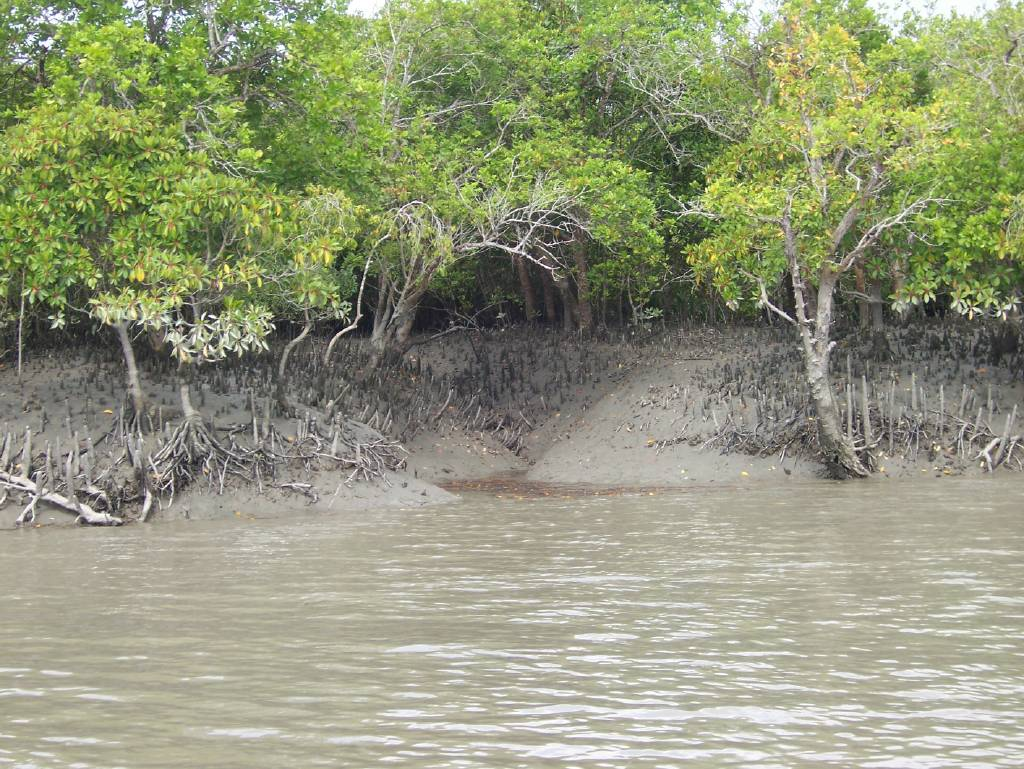
Mangroves provide nurseries for fish

Mangrove swamps and salt marshes form important coastal habitats in tropical and temperate areas respectively.

Mangroves are species of shrubs and medium size trees that grow in saline coastal sediment habitats in the tropics and subtropics – mainly between latitudes 25° N and 25° S. The saline conditions tolerated by various species range from brackish water, through pure seawater (30 to 40 ppt), to water concentrated by evaporation to over twice the salinity of ocean seawater (up to 90 ppt). There are many mangrove species, not all closely related. The term "mangrove" is used generally to cover all of these species, and it can be used narrowly to cover just mangrove trees of the genus Rhizophora.

Mangroves form a distinct characteristic saline woodland or shrubland habitat, called a mangrove swamp or mangrove forest. Mangrove swamps are found in depositional coastal environments, where fine sediments (often with high organic content) collect in areas protected from high-energy wave action. Mangroves dominate three quarters of tropical coastlines.

=== Estuaries ===
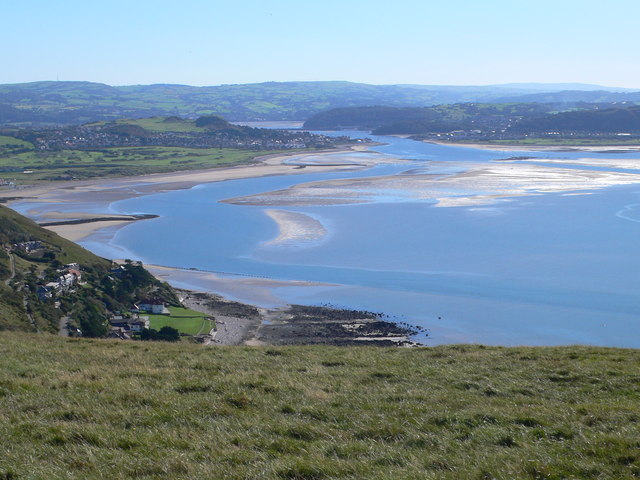
Estuaries occur when rivers flow into a coastal bay or inlet. They are nutrient rich and have a transition zone which moves from freshwater to saltwater.

An estuary is a partly enclosed coastal body of water with one or more rivers or streams flowing into it, and with a free connection to the open sea. Estuaries form a transition zone between river environments and ocean environments and are subject to both marine influences, such as tides, waves, and the influx of saline water; and riverine influences, such as flows of fresh water and sediment. The inflow of both seawater and freshwater provide high levels of nutrients in both the water column and sediment, making estuaries among the most productive natural habitats in the world.

Most estuaries were formed by the flooding of river-eroded or glacially scoured valleys when sea level began to rise about 10,000-12,000 years ago. They are amongst the most heavily populated areas throughout the world, with about 60% of the world's population living along estuaries and the coast. As a result, estuaries are suffering degradation by many factors, including sedimentation from soil erosion from deforestation; overgrazing and other poor farming practices; overfishing; drainage and filling of wetlands; eutrophication due to excessive nutrients from sewage and animal wastes; pollutants including heavy metals, PCBs, radionuclides and hydrocarbons from sewage inputs; and diking or damming for flood control or water diversion.

Estuaries provide habitats for a large number of organisms and support very high productivity. Estuaries provide habitats for salmon and sea trout nurseries, as well as migratory bird populations. Two of the main characteristics of estuarine life are the variability in salinity and sedimentation. Many species of fish and invertebrates have various methods to control or conform to the shifts in salt concentrations and are termed osmoconformers and osmoregulators. Many animals also burrow to avoid predation and to live in the more stable sedimental environment. However, large numbers of bacteria are found within the sediment which have a very high oxygen demand. This reduces the levels of oxygen within the sediment often resulting in partially anoxic conditions, which can be further exacerbated by limited water flux. Phytoplankton are key primary producers in estuaries. They move with the water bodies and can be flushed in and out with the tides. Their productivity is largely dependent on the turbidity of the water. The main phytoplankton present are diatoms and dinoflagellates which are abundant in the sediment.

=== Kelp forests ===
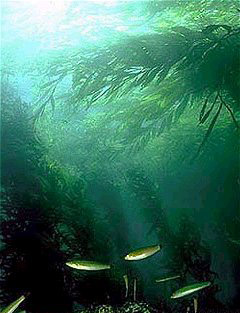
Kelp forests provide habitat for many marine organisms

Kelp forests are underwater areas with a high density of kelp. They form some of the most productive and dynamic ecosystems on Earth. Smaller areas of anchored kelp are called kelp beds. Kelp forests occur worldwide throughout temperate and polar coastal oceans.

Kelp forests provide a unique three-dimensional habitat for marine organisms and are a source for understanding many ecological processes. Over the last century, they have been the focus of extensive research, particularly in trophic ecology, and continue to provoke important ideas that are relevant beyond this unique ecosystem. For example, kelp forests can influence coastal oceanographic patterns and provide many ecosystem services.

However, humans have contributed to kelp forest degradation. Of particular concern are the effects of overfishing nearshore ecosystems, which can release herbivores from their normal population regulation and result in the over-grazing of kelp and other algae. This can rapidly result in transitions to barren landscapes where relatively few species persist.

Frequently considered an ecosystem engineer, kelp provides a physical substrate and habitat for kelp forest communities. In algae (Kingdom: Protista), the body of an individual organism is known as a thallus rather than as a plant (Kingdom: Plantae). The morphological structure of a kelp thallus is defined by three basic structural units:

- The holdfast is a root-like mass that anchors the thallus to the sea floor, though unlike true roots it is not responsible for absorbing and delivering nutrients to the rest of the thallus;
- The stipe is analogous to a plant stalk, extending vertically from the holdfast and providing a support framework for other morphological features;
- The fronds are leaf- or blade-like attachments extending from the stipe, sometimes along its full length, and are the sites of nutrient uptake and photosynthetic activity.

In addition, many kelp species have pneumatocysts, or gas-filled bladders, usually located at the base of fronds near the stipe. These structures provide the necessary buoyancy for kelp to maintain an upright position in the water column.

The environmental factors necessary for kelp to survive include hard substrate (usually rock), high nutrients (e.g., nitrogen, phosphorus), and light (minimum annual irradiance dose > 50 E m^{−2}). Especially productive kelp forests tend to be associated with areas of significant oceanographic upwelling, a process that delivers cool nutrient-rich water from depth to the ocean's mixed surface layer. Water flow and turbulence facilitate nutrient assimilation across kelp fronds throughout the water column. Water clarity affects the depth to which sufficient light can be transmitted. In ideal conditions, giant kelp (Macrocystis spp.) can grow as much as 30-60 centimetres vertically per day. Some species such as Nereocystis are annual while others like Eisenia are perennial, living for more than 20 years. In perennial kelp forests, maximum growth rates occur during upwelling months (typically spring and summer) and die-backs correspond to reduced nutrient availability, shorter photoperiods and increased storm frequency.

=== Seagrass meadows ===
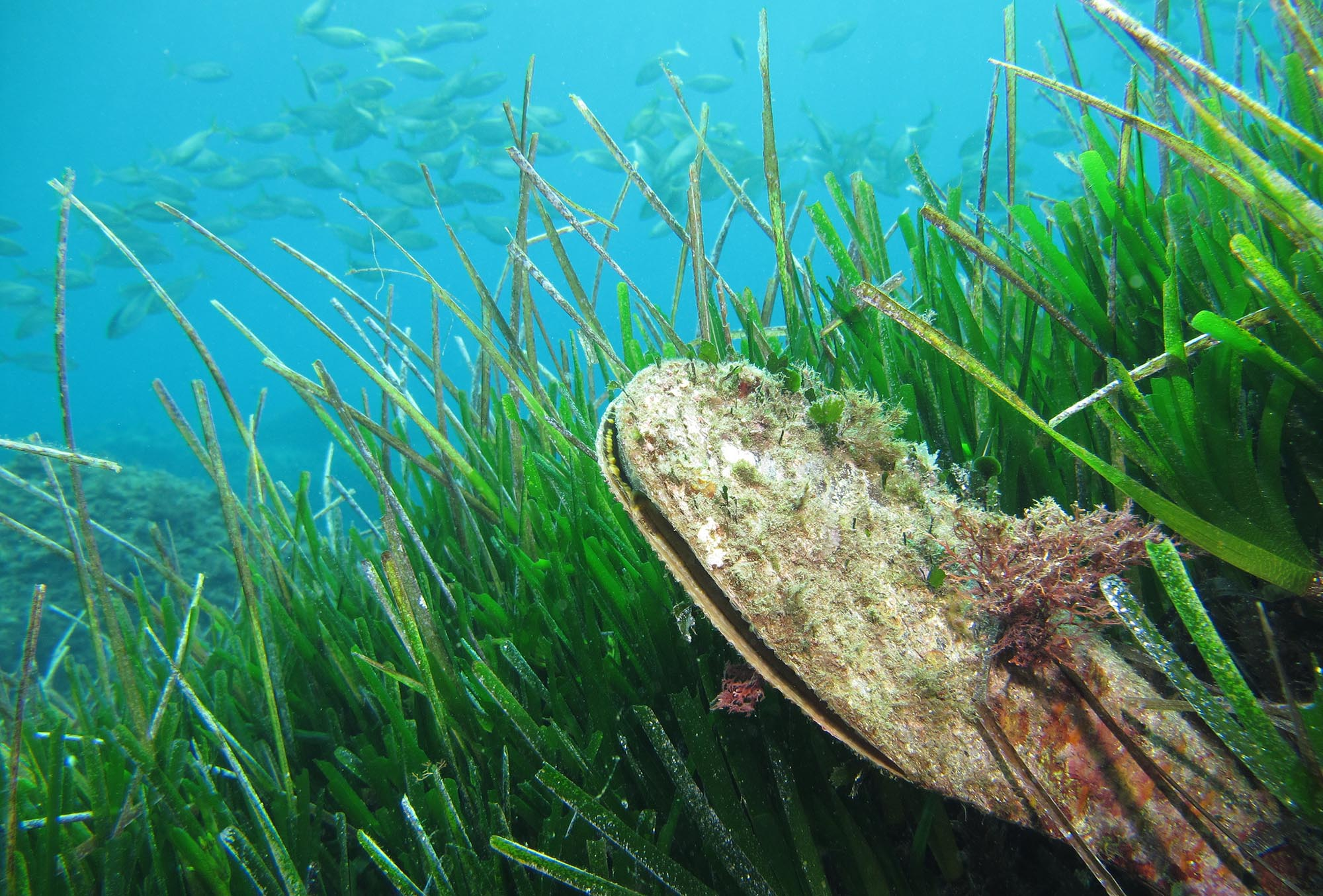
Fan mussel in a Mediterranean seagrass meadow

Seagrasses are flowering plants from one of four plant families which grow in marine environments. They are called seagrasses because the leaves are long and narrow and are very often green, and because the plants often grow in large meadows which look like grassland. Since seagrasses photosynthesize and are submerged, they must grow submerged in the photic zone, where there is enough sunlight. For this reason, most occur in shallow and sheltered coastal waters anchored in sand or mud bottoms.

Seagrasses form extensive beds or meadows, which can be either monospecific (made up of one species) or multispecific (where more than one species co-exist). Seagrass beds make highly diverse and productive ecosystems. They are home to phyla such as juvenile and adult fish, epiphytic and free-living macroalgae and microalgae, mollusks, bristle worms, and nematodes. Few species were originally considered to feed directly on seagrass leaves (partly because of their low nutritional content), but scientific reviews and improved working methods have shown that seagrass herbivory is a highly important link in the food chain, with hundreds of species feeding on seagrasses worldwide, including green turtles, dugongs, manatees, fish, geese, swans, sea urchins and crabs.

Seagrasses are ecosystem engineers in the sense that they partly create their own habitat. The leaves slow down water-currents increasing sedimentation, and the seagrass roots and rhizomes stabilize the seabed. Their importance to associated species is mainly due to provision of shelter (through their three-dimensional structure in the water column), and due to their extraordinarily high rate of primary production. As a result, seagrasses provide coastal zones with ecosystem services, such as fishing grounds, wave protection, oxygen production and protection against coastal erosion. Seagrass meadows account for 15% of the ocean's total carbon storage.

=== Reefs ===
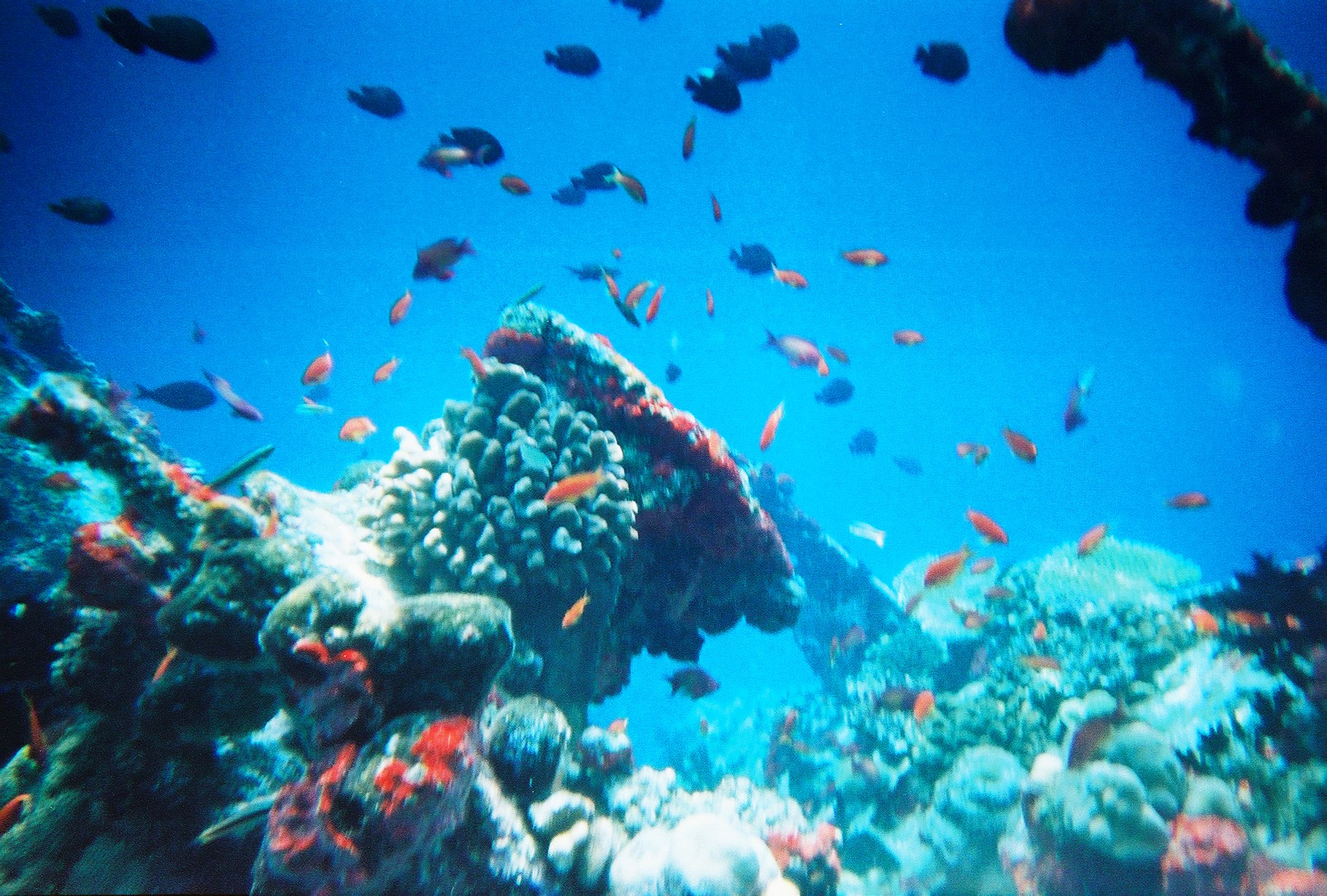

A reef is a ridge or shoal of rock, coral or similar relatively stable material, lying beneath the surface of a natural body of water. Many reefs result from natural, abiotic processes but there are also reefs such as the coral reefs of tropical waters formed by biotic processes dominated by corals and coralline algae. Artificial reefs such as shipwrecks and other anthropogenic underwater structures may occur intentionally or as the result of an accident, and sometimes have a designed role in enhancing the physical complexity of featureless sand bottoms, thereby attracting a more diverse assemblage of organisms. Reefs are often quite near to the surface, but not all definitions require this. Fringing reefs, the most common type of reef, are found close to shorelines and surrounding islands.

==== Rocky reefs ====
Rocky reefs are underwater outcrops of rock projecting above the adjacent unconsolidated surface with varying relief. They can be found in depth ranges from intertidal to deep water and provide a substrate for a large range of sessile benthic organisms, and shelter for a large range of mobile organisms.

Prominent examples of rocky reefs include the kelp-forested temperate reefs along the Pacific coast of North America, the extensive cold-water systems of the Great Southern Reef in Australia, and the biologically diverse rocky sub-littoral habitats found throughout the Mediterranean Basin. Other notable regions featuring well-studied rocky reefs include the coastal waters of New Zealand and the wave-exposed rocky shores of the British Isles and Western Europe.

==== Coral reefs ====
Coral reefs comprise some of the densest and most diverse habitats in the world. The best-known types of reefs are tropical coral reefs which exist in most tropical waters; however, coral reefs can also exist in cold water. Reefs are built up by corals and other calcium-depositing animals, usually on top of a rocky outcrop on the ocean floor. Reefs can also grow on other surfaces, which has made it possible to create artificial reefs. Coral reefs also support a huge community of life, including the corals themselves, their symbiotic zooxanthellae, tropical fish and many other organisms.

Much attention in marine biology is focused on coral reefs and the El Niño weather phenomenon. In 1998, coral reefs experienced the most severe mass bleaching events on record, when vast expanses of reefs across the world died because sea surface temperatures rose well above normal. Some reefs are recovering, but scientists say that between 50% and 70% of the world's coral reefs are now endangered and predict that global warming could exacerbate this trend.

== Surface waters ==
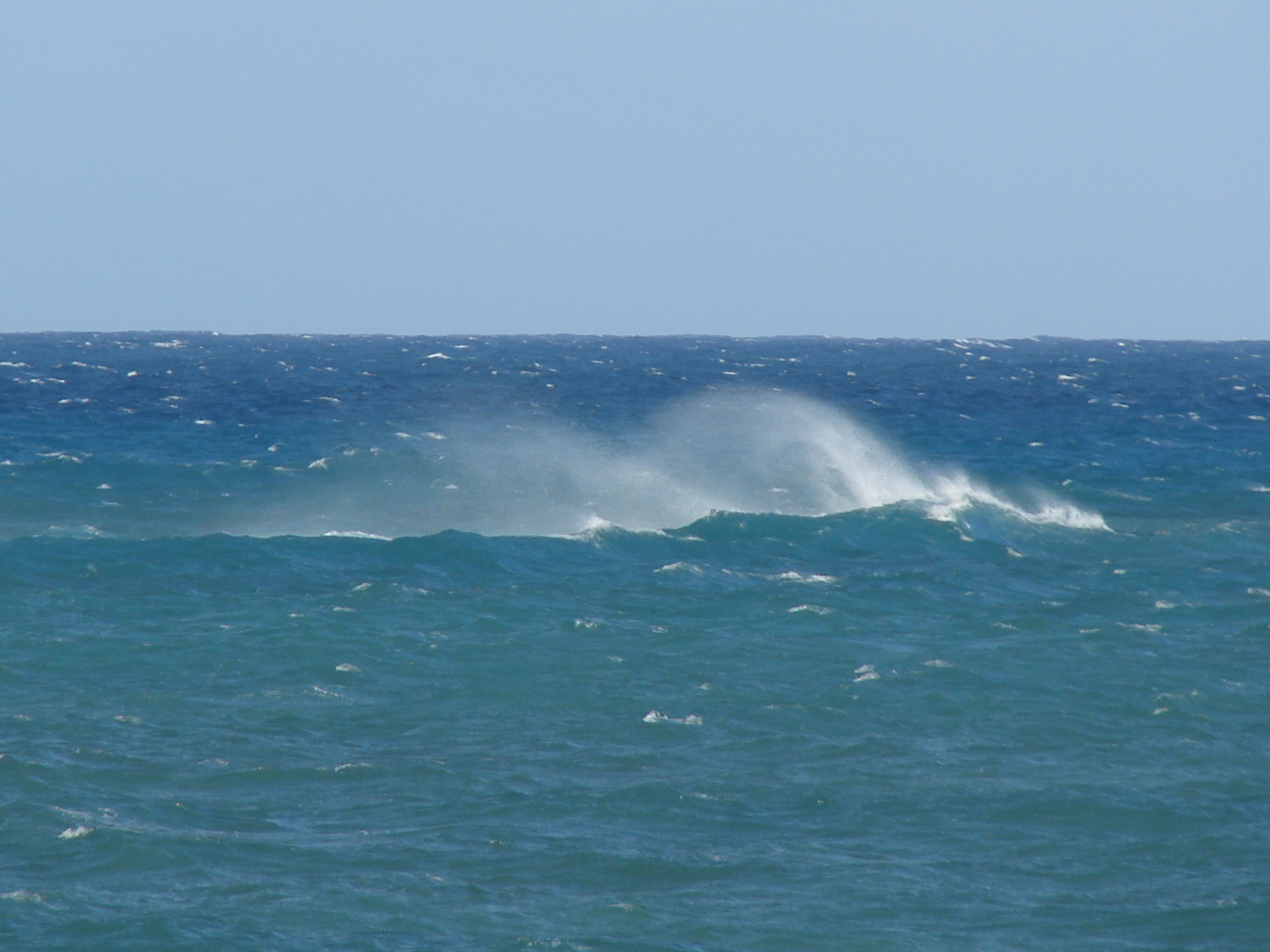
In the open ocean, sunlit surface epipelagic waters get enough light for photosynthesis, but there are often not enough nutrients. As a result, large areas contain little life apart from migrating animals.

=== Surface microlayer ===
The surface microlayer of the ocean serves as the transitional area between the atmosphere and the ocean. It covers around 70% of the Earth's surface as it covers most of the ocean waters on the planet. The microlayer is known for its unique biological and chemical properties which give it a small ecosystem of its own and serves as a distinct habitat from the deeper ocean waters.

The surface microlayer is not in fact entirely aqueous like the rest of the ocean, but is closer to a kind of hydrated gel composed of concentrated nutrients forming a biological film over the water it covers. This film is rich in microbes which mediate the interactions between the sun, the atmosphere, and the waters below.

Although thin, the surface microlayer is critical for life beneath it. Because of the environment rich in microbes and nutrients, larvae of fish and other aquatic animals are often laid in the microlayer to incubate. The plankton in the microlayer are distinctly adapted to withstand high levels of radiation, and serve as buffers to prevent this potentially harmful radiation from reaching the deeper water. Environmental changes such as aerosols or dust storms can cause these surface plankton to become overproductive, leading to blooms.

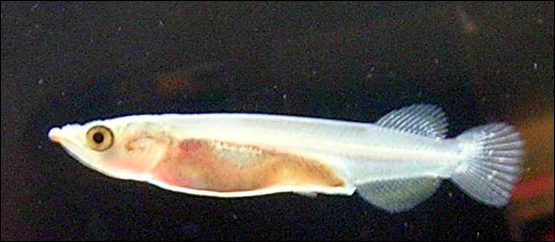
Halfbeak as larvae are one of the organisms adapted to the unique properties of the microlayer

Because of the unique properties of the microlayer, pollutants often accumulate within and use it to reach other parts of the ocean. Hydrophobic compounds, such as petroleum, flame retardants, and heavy metals, have a particular affinity for the surface microlayer. Recently, the abundance of aerosols and microplastics has also had an impact on the SML and their accumulation has led to many problems, such as animal ingestion of these compounds leading to widespread disruption of balance and spread of these compounds among marine communities.

The surface microlayer is also critical to gas exchange between the atmosphere and the ocean. Because the microlayer is filled with microbes, it is widely theorized that it plays a critical role in gas exchange and uptake of nutrients, but relatively little data on this has been collected. The central feature of the microlayer is the temperature, as it is an indicator of how pollutants and human activity affects the ocean.

=== Epipelagic zone ===
The surface waters are sunlit. The waters down to about 200 metres are said to be in the epipelagic zone. Enough sunlight enters the epipelagic zone to allow photosynthesis by phytoplankton. The epipelagic zone is usually low in nutrients. This partially because the organic debris produced in the zone, such as excrement and dead animals, sink to the depths and are lost to the upper zone. Photosynthesis can happen only if both sunlight and nutrients are present.

In some places, like at the edge of continental shelves, nutrients can upwell from the ocean depth, or land runoff can be distributed by storms and ocean currents. In these areas, given that both sunlight and nutrients are now present, phytoplankton can rapidly establish itself, multiplying so fast that the water turns green from the chlorophyll, resulting in an algal bloom. These nutrient rich surface waters are among the most biologically productive in the world, supporting billions of tonnes of biomass.

"Phytoplankton are eaten by zooplankton - small animals which, like phytoplankton, drift in the ocean currents. The most abundant zooplankton species are copepods and krill: tiny crustaceans that are the most numerous animals on Earth. Other types of zooplankton include jelly fish and the larvae of fish, marine worms, starfish, and other marine organisms". In turn, the zooplankton are eaten by filter-feeding animals, including some seabirds, small forage fish like herrings and sardines, whale sharks, manta rays, and the largest animal in the world, the blue whale. Yet again, moving up the foodchain, the small forage fish are in turn eaten by larger predators, such as tuna, marlin, sharks, large squid, seabirds, dolphins, and toothed whales.

== Open ocean ==
Elevation-area graph showing the proportion of land area at given heights and the proportion of ocean area at given depths

The open ocean is relatively unproductive because of a lack of nutrients, yet because it is so vast, it has more overall primary production than any other marine habitat. Only about 10 percent of marine species live in the open ocean. But among them are the largest and fastest of all marine animals, as well as the animals that dive the deepest and migrate the longest.

=== Deep sea ===
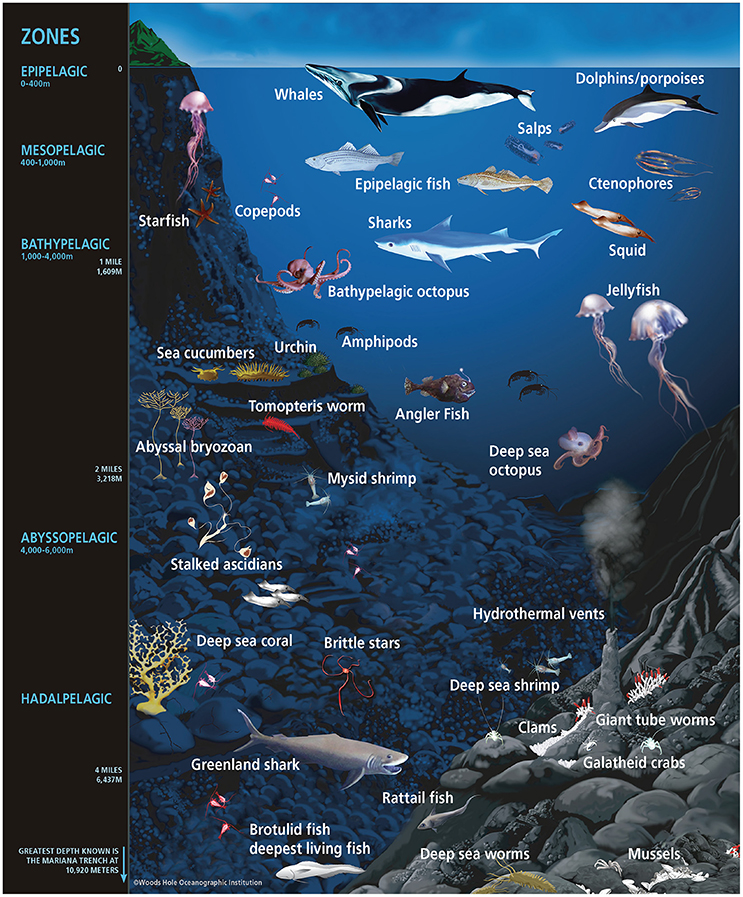
Some representative ocean animal life (not drawn to scale) within their approximate depth-defined ecological habitats. Marine microorganisms exist on the surfaces and within the tissues and organs of the diverse life inhabiting the ocean, across all ocean habitats.

Scale diagram of the layers of the pelagic zone

The deep sea starts at the aphotic zone, the point where sunlight loses most of its energy in the water. Many life forms that live at these depths have the ability to create their own light a unique evolution known as bio-luminescence.

In the deep ocean, the waters extend far below the epipelagic zone, and support very different types of pelagic life forms adapted to living in these deeper zones.

Much of the aphotic zone's energy is supplied by the open ocean in the form of detritus. In deep water, marine snow is a continuous shower of mostly organic detritus falling from the upper layers of the water column. Its origin lies in activities within the productive photic zone. Marine snow includes dead or dying plankton, protists (diatoms), fecal matter, sand, soot and other inorganic dust. The "snowflakes" grow over time and may reach several centimetres in diameter, travelling for weeks before reaching the ocean floor. However, most organic components of marine snow are consumed by microbes, zooplankton and other filter-feeding animals within the first 1,000 metres of their journey, that is, within the epipelagic zone. In this way marine snow may be considered the foundation of deep-sea mesopelagic and benthic ecosystems: As sunlight cannot reach them, deep-sea organisms rely heavily on marine snow as an energy source.

Some deep-sea pelagic groups, such as the lanternfish, ridgehead, marine hatchetfish, and lightfish families are sometimes termed pseudoceanic because, rather than having an even distribution in open water, they occur in significantly higher abundances around structural oases, notably seamounts and over continental slopes. The phenomenon is explained by the likewise abundance of prey species which are also attracted to the structures.

The fish in the different pelagic and deep water benthic zones are physically structured, and behave in ways, that differ markedly from each other. Groups of coexisting species within each zone all seem to operate in similar ways, such as the small mesopelagic vertically migrating plankton-feeders, the bathypelagic anglerfishes, and the deep water benthic rattails. "

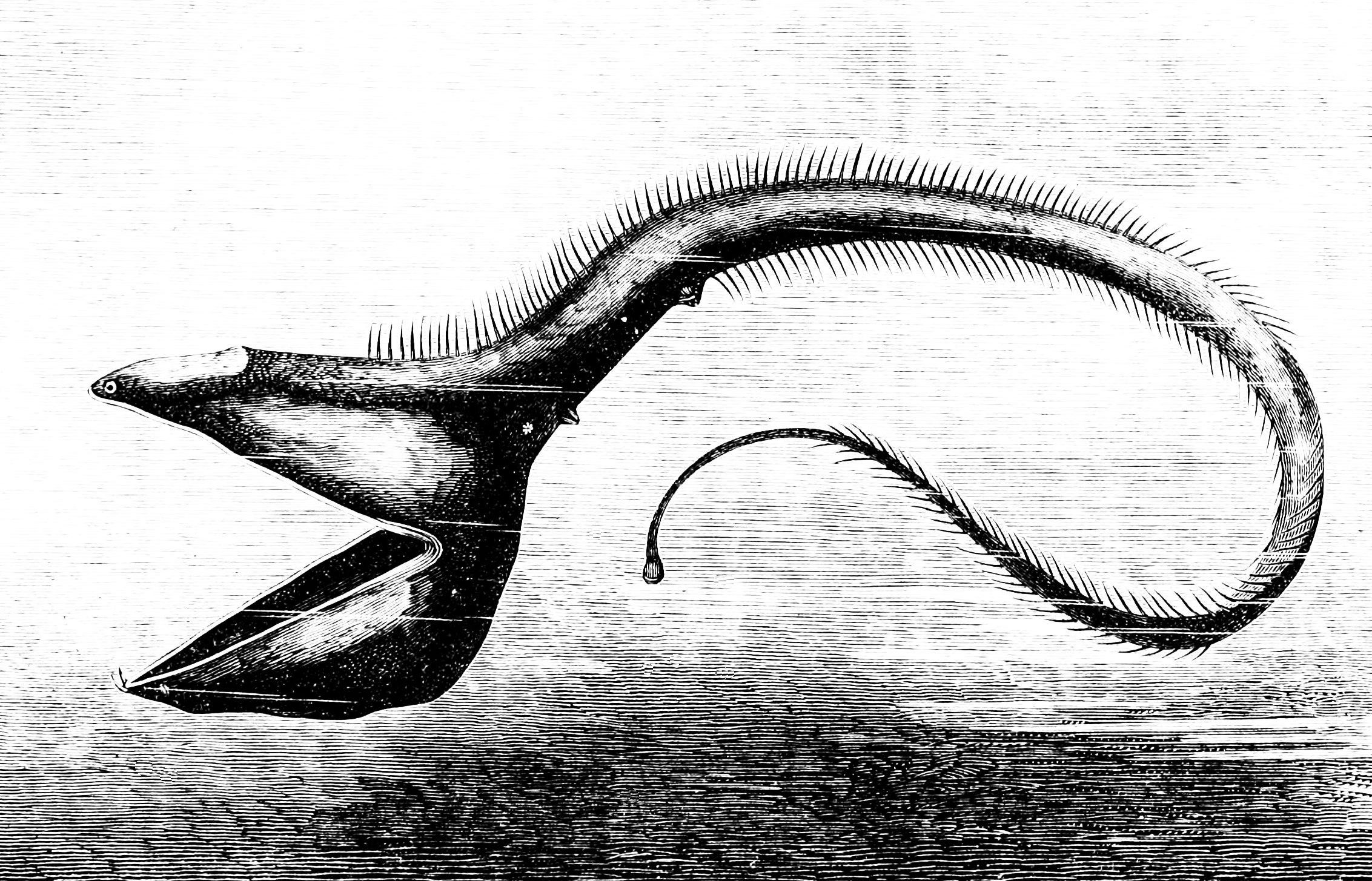
The umbrella mouth gulper eel can swallow a fish much larger than itself

Ray finned species, with spiny fins, are rare among deep sea fishes, which suggests that deep sea fish are ancient and so well adapted to their environment that invasions by more modern fishes have been unsuccessful. The few ray fins that do exist are mainly in the Beryciformes and Lampriformes, which are also ancient forms. Most deep sea pelagic fishes belong to their own orders, suggesting a long evolution in deep sea environments. In contrast, deep water benthic species, are in orders that include many related shallow water fishes.

The umbrella mouth gulper is a deep sea eel with an enormous loosely hinged mouth. It can open its mouth wide enough to swallow a fish much larger than itself, and then expand its stomach to accommodate its catch.

== Sea floor ==
=== Vents and seeps ===
Hydrothermal vents along the mid-ocean ridge spreading centers act as oases, as do their opposites, cold seeps. Such places support unique marine biomes and many new marine microorganisms and other lifeforms have been discovered at these locations.

=== Trenches ===
The deepest recorded oceanic trenches measure to date is the Mariana Trench, near the Philippines, in the Pacific Ocean at 10,924 m (35,838 ft). At such depths, water pressure is extreme and there is no sunlight, but some life still exists. A white flatfish, a shrimp and a jellyfish were seen by the American crew of the bathyscaphe Trieste when it dove to the bottom in 1960.

=== Seamounts ===
Marine life also flourishes around seamounts that rise from the depths, where fish and other sea life congregate to spawn and feed.

== Anthropogenic impacts ==
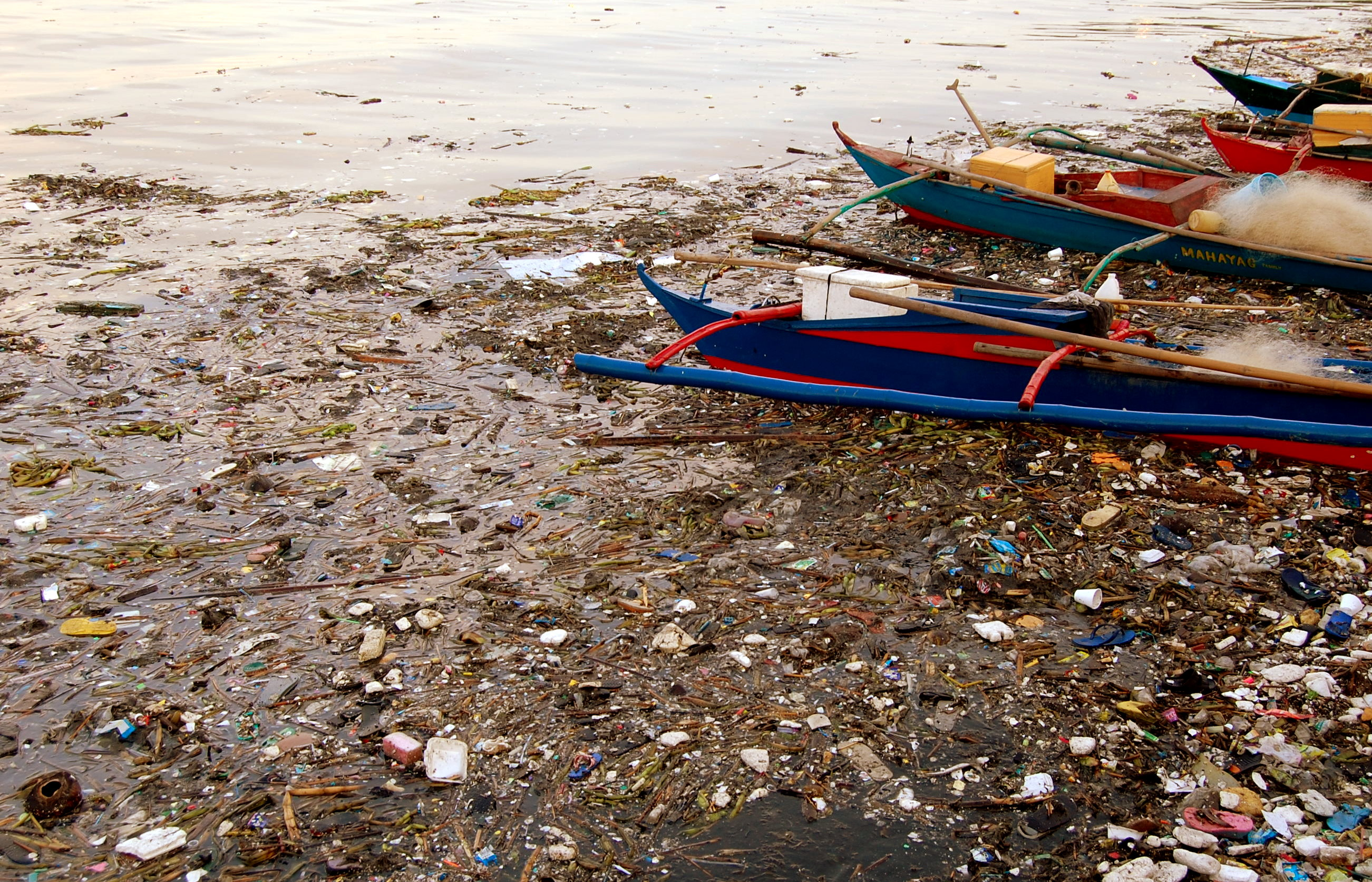
Mudflat pollution

Mudflats are typically important regions for wildlife, supporting a large population, although levels of biodiversity are not particularly high. They are of particular importance to migratory birds as well as crabs, shrimp, and shellfish. These areas along the coast act as a nursery for these animals by providing an area for reproduction and feeding. However, this can pose as an issue due to the high trafficking of the birds migrating for nesting, then leaving to return to their seasonal homes. Whatever pollutants the birds take in while breeding are brought back with them to their next location, thus polluting that area as well. In the United Kingdom mudflats have been classified as a Biodiversity Action Plan priority habitat. European countries such as France have also found it beneficial to use the Marine Influence Index (MII) to be able to monitor the responses to pollution the local plant and animal species may have as well as monitor any type of deviation from the natural patterns displayed previously.

Although many parts of the seafloor have yet to be explored, researchers have found that parts of it have been greatly affected by human activity. Bottom trawling, microplastic pollution, and industrial metals have slowly changed and altered the composition of the sea floor. Bottom trawling refers to a commercial deep sea fishing technique in which the equipment drags across the sea floor. This has had an adverse effect on the seafloor as it changes the surface structure and composition. In addition, microplastic pollution has become an increasing problem to the seafloor as plastics and other debris are found in many of the sediments. Due to the build up of litter, the habitats and environments of organisms on the seafloor are being impacted and changed. This includes industrial facilities dumping new metals and minerals, such as cadmium, onto the seafloor that change the chemical composition of the water and poison the inhabitants.

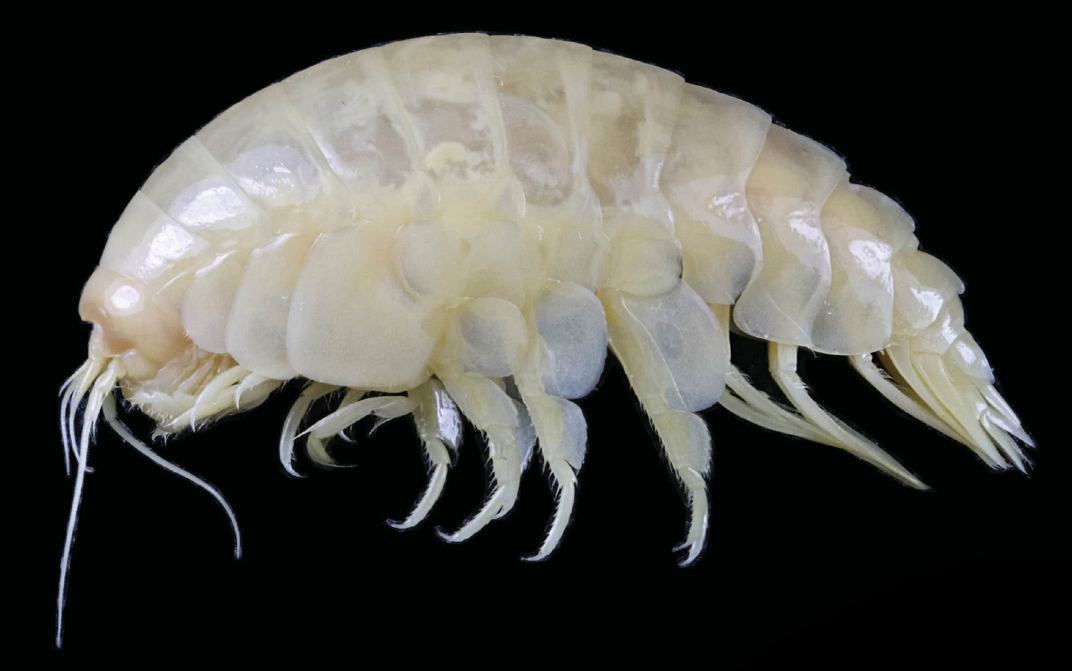
The deep sea amphipod Eurythenes plasticus, named after microplastics found in its body, demonstrating plastic pollution affects marine habitats even 6000m below sea level.

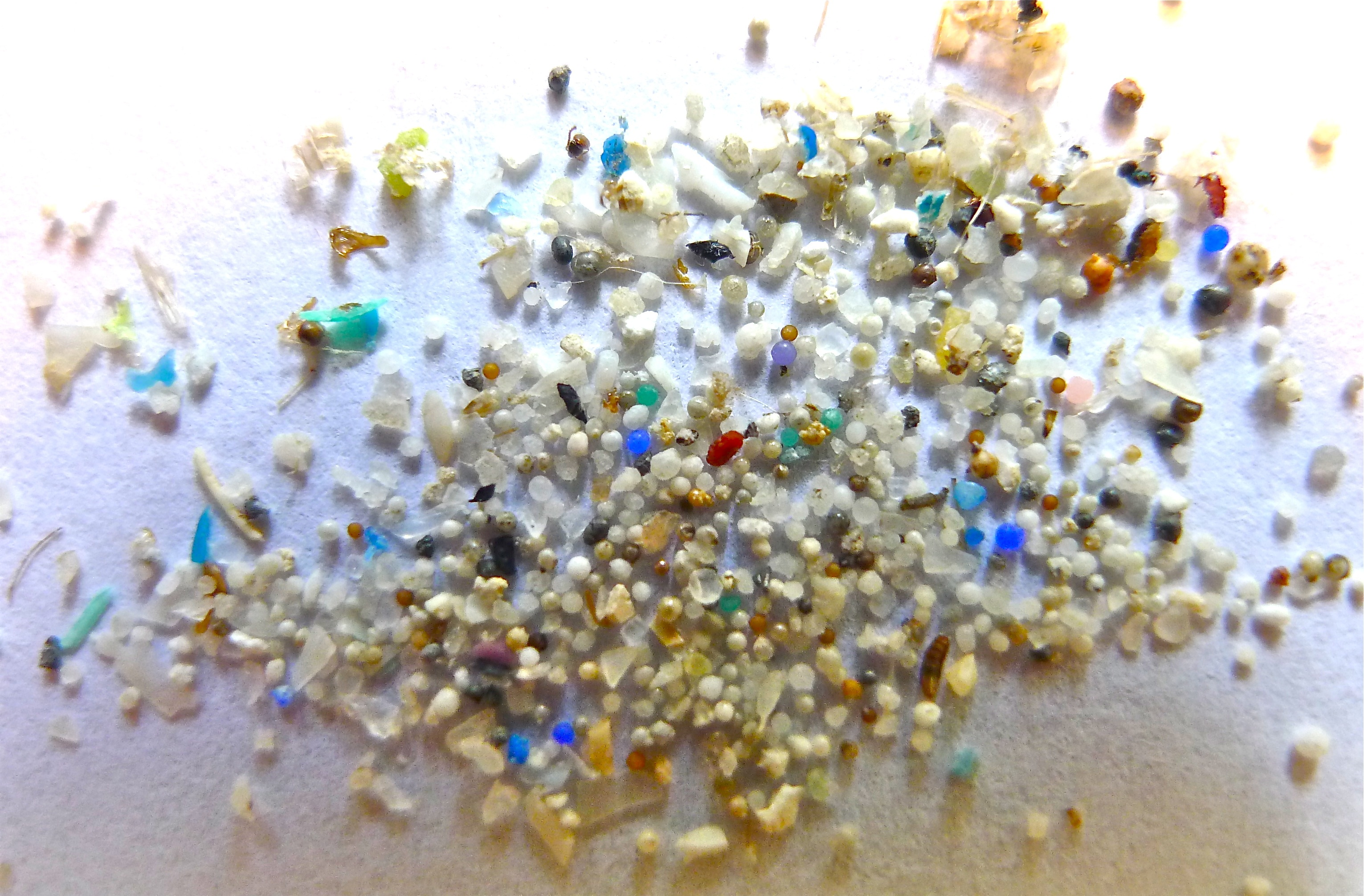
Microplastics found in sediments on the seafloor

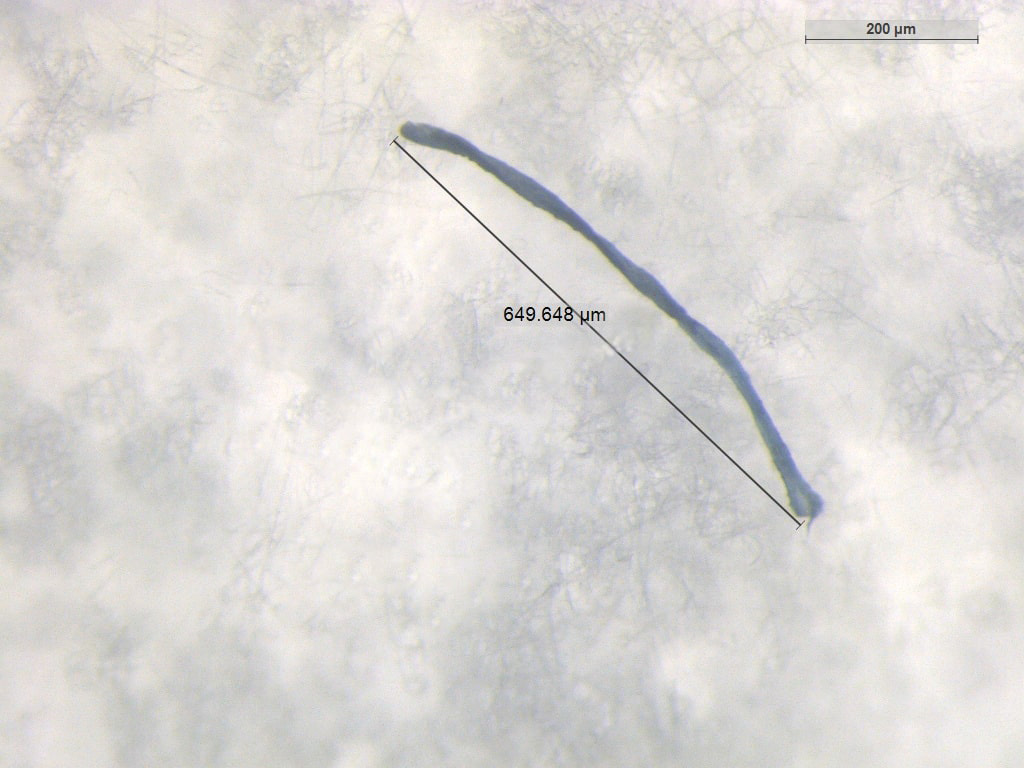
640 μm microplastic found in the deep sea amphipod Eurythenes plasticus

There are also negative anthropogenic impacts on deep sea habitats, including trash pollution and chemical pollution. Plastic pollution in particular, is one of the greatest forms of uncontrolled human activity that is visible in our oceans today. Researchers in the Northwestern south China Sea recorded large plastic-dominated litter piles in submarine canyons. These durable plastics can diffuse into smaller organisms and are then inadvertently consumed by humans in the food we eat and water we drink. Another threat to organisms lurking in the deep ocean is ghost fishing, and bycatch. Ghost fishing is the term that refers to any abandoned fishing gear in the ocean that continues to entangle and trap marine organisms. Gill nets for example, have been recorded tangled around deep sea corals and continue ghost fishing for extended periods of time.

== Gallery ==
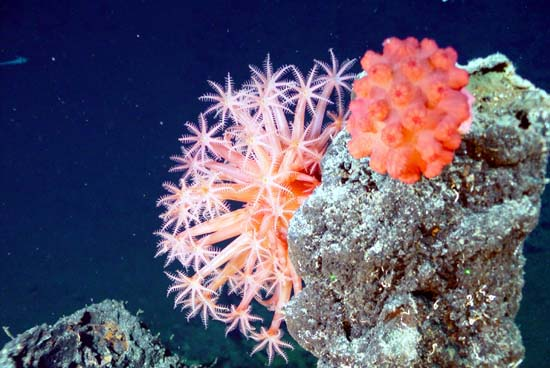
Deepsea mushroom corals growing on the chimney of an Explorer Ridge hydrothermal vent

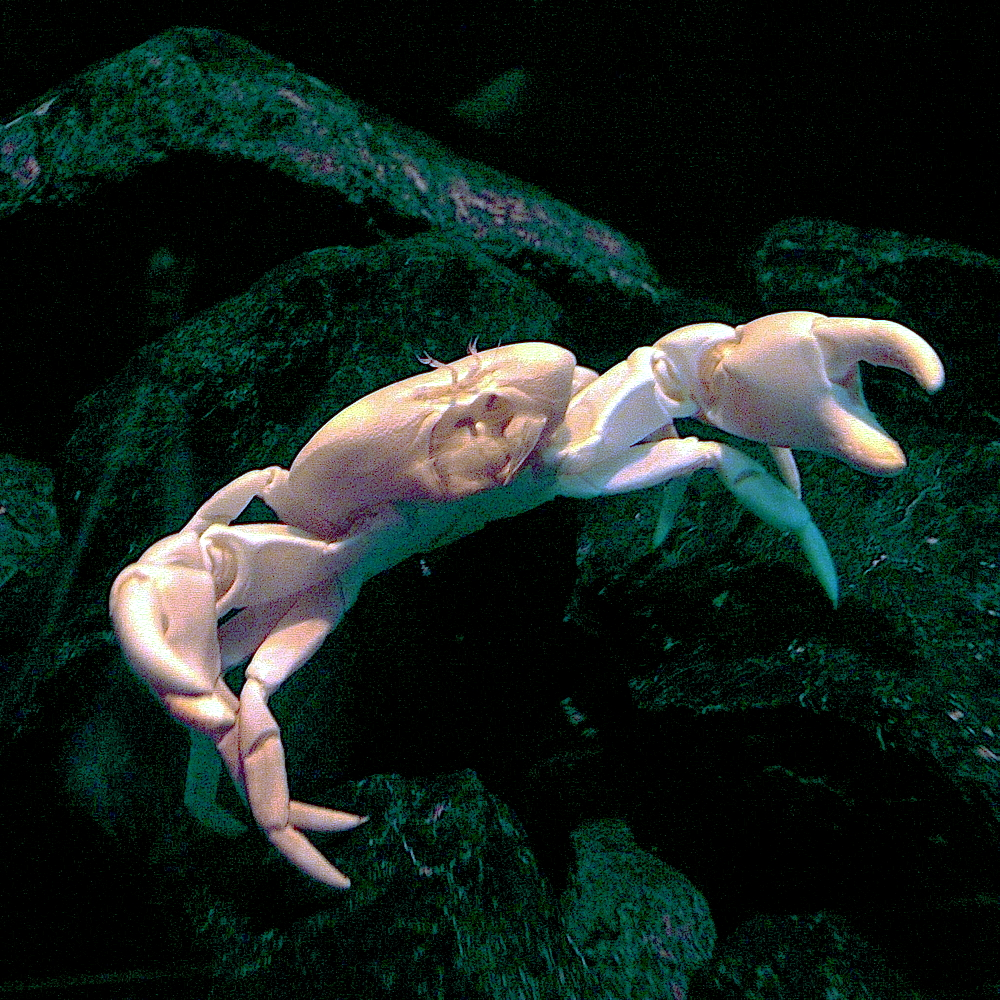
Deep sea crab found on hydrothermal vents in the Philippine Sea

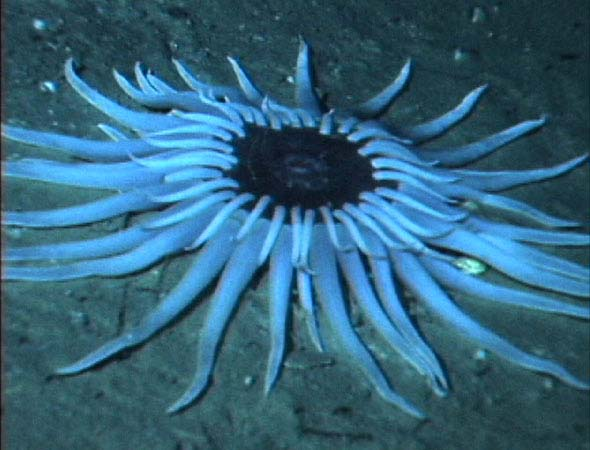
Deep sea anemone on Blake Ridge

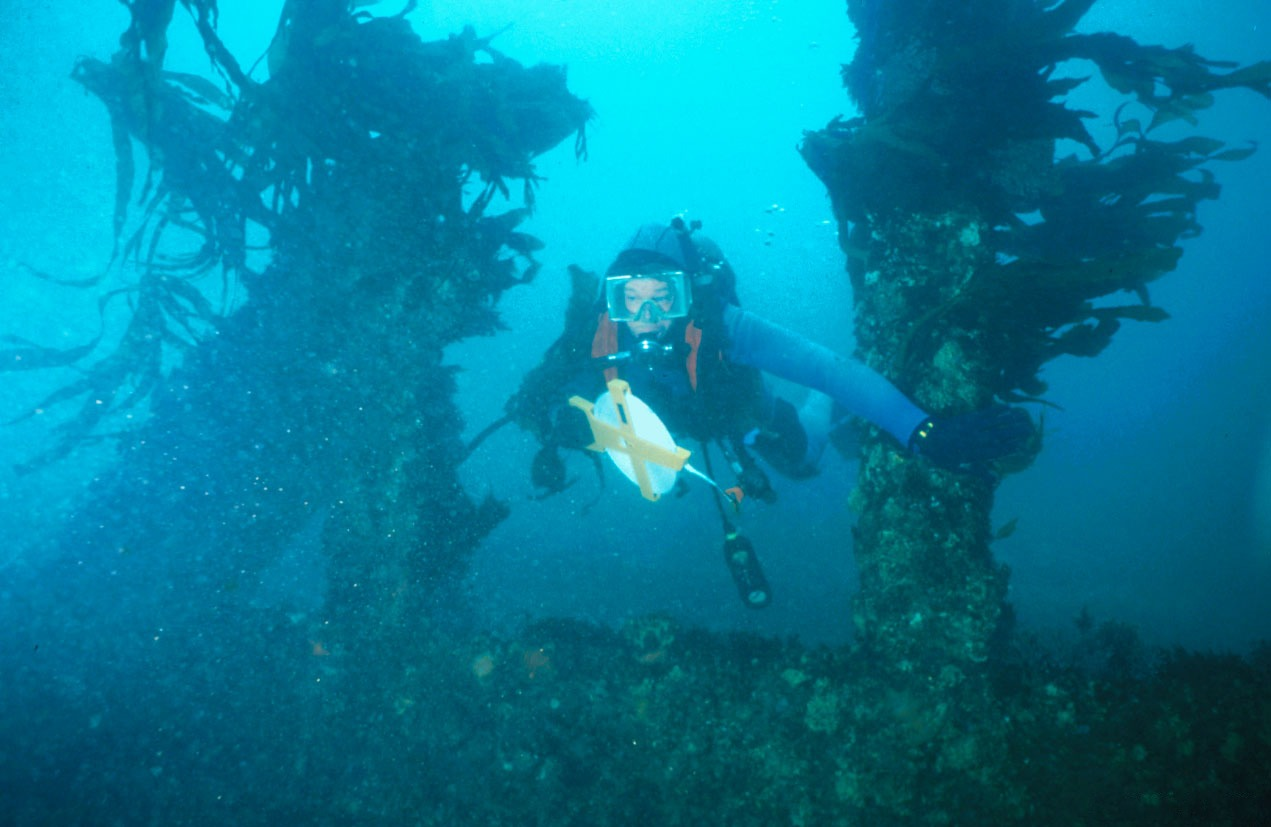
Submerged wrecks create artificial reef habitat

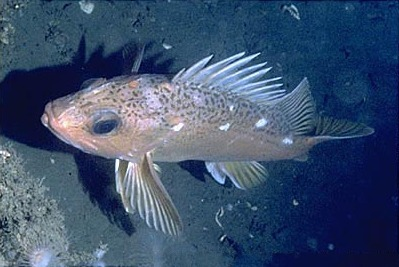
Versatile rockfish can be found living in almost any habitat from rocky bottoms to sand and mud, and from vertical faces to horizontal plains.

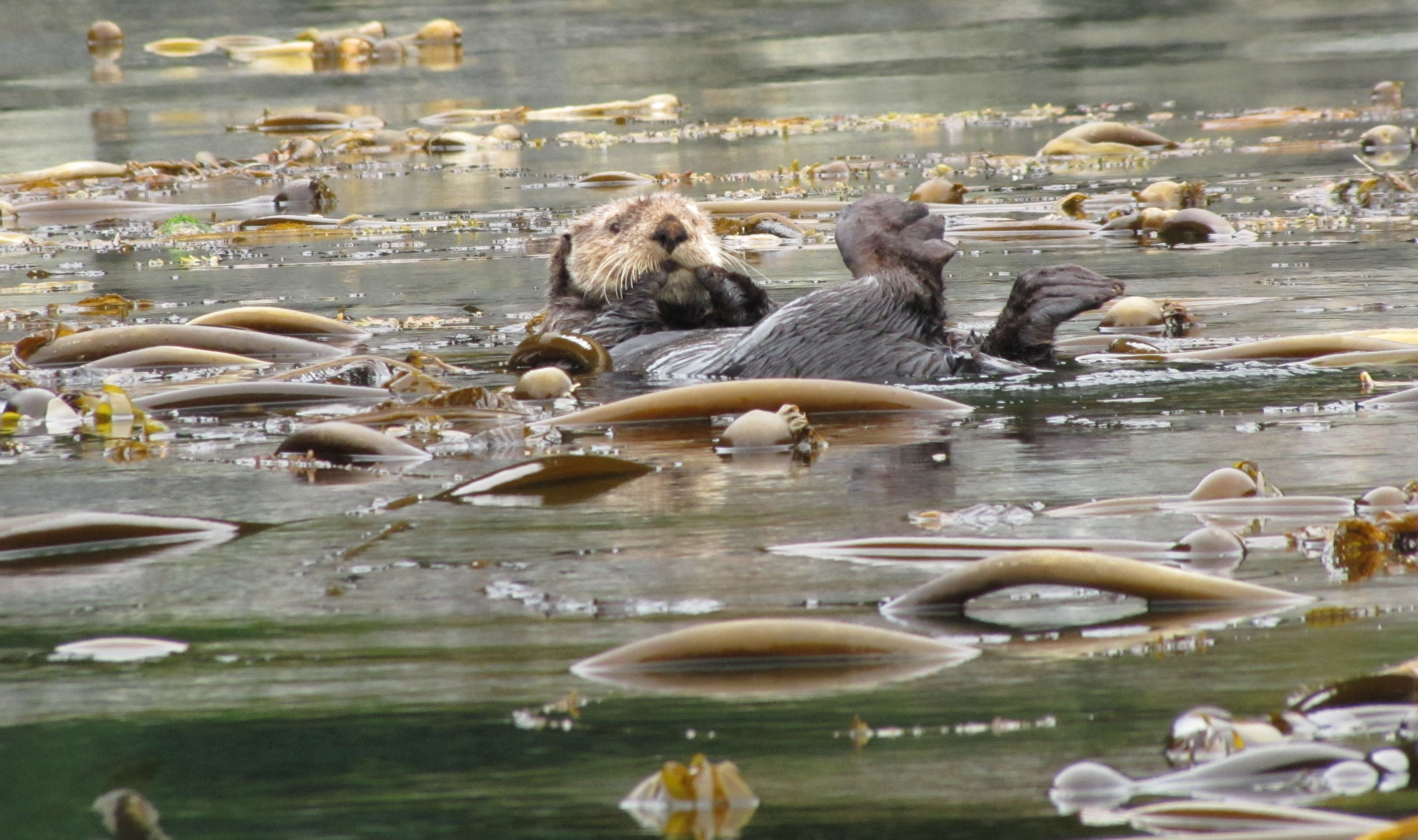
Marine life within the kelp forest and rocky reef habitat

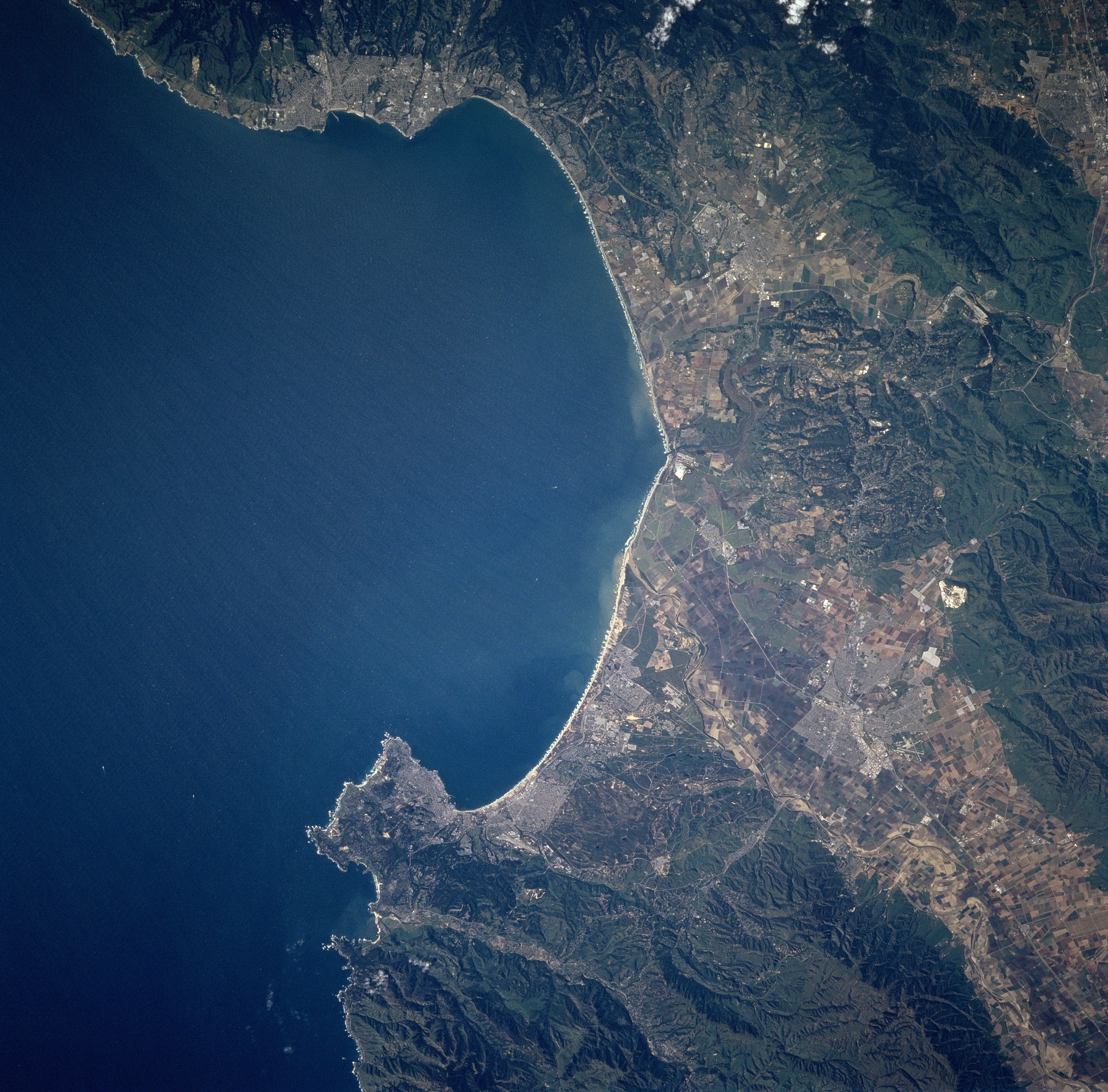
Monterey Bay, the largest marine sanctuary in the United States, is home to the world's largest group of marine research institutions

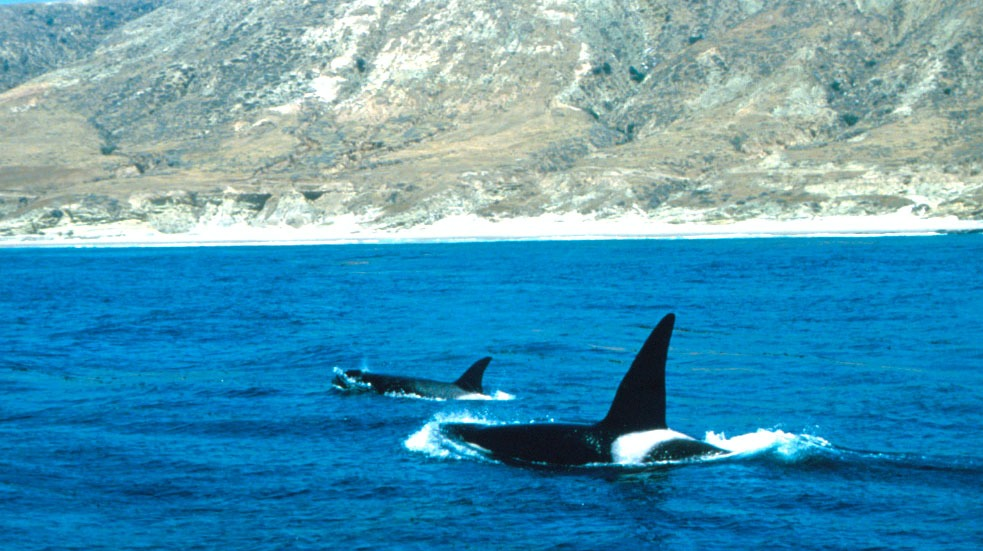
The killer whale, apex predator of the ocean, cruises a huge range of different marine habitats

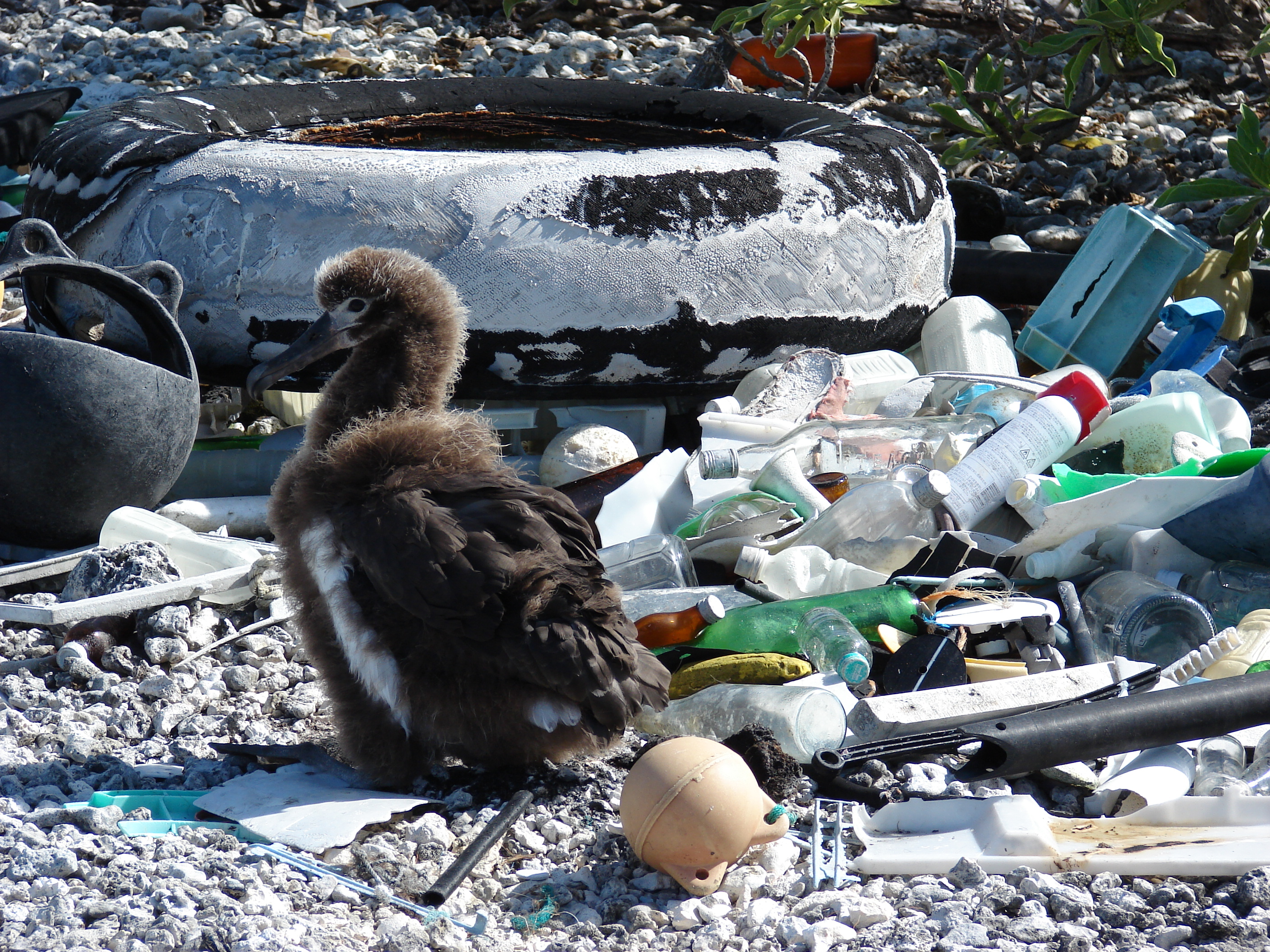
Laysan albatross chick in a contemporary modified habitat, surrounded by human marine debris

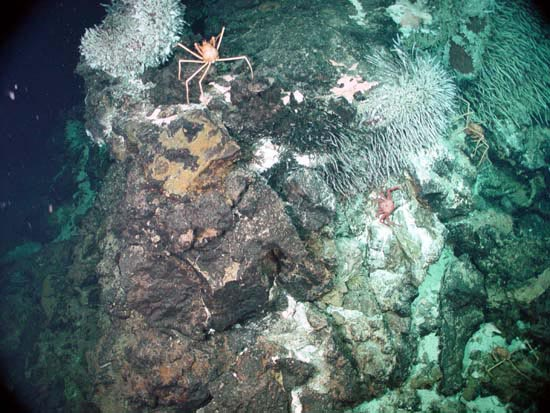
Zooarium chimney provides a habitat for vent biota

== See also ==
- Effects of climate change on oceans
- Future of Marine Animal Populations
- Maritime forest
- Seashore wildlife
- Underwater habitat (underwater habitats for humans)
