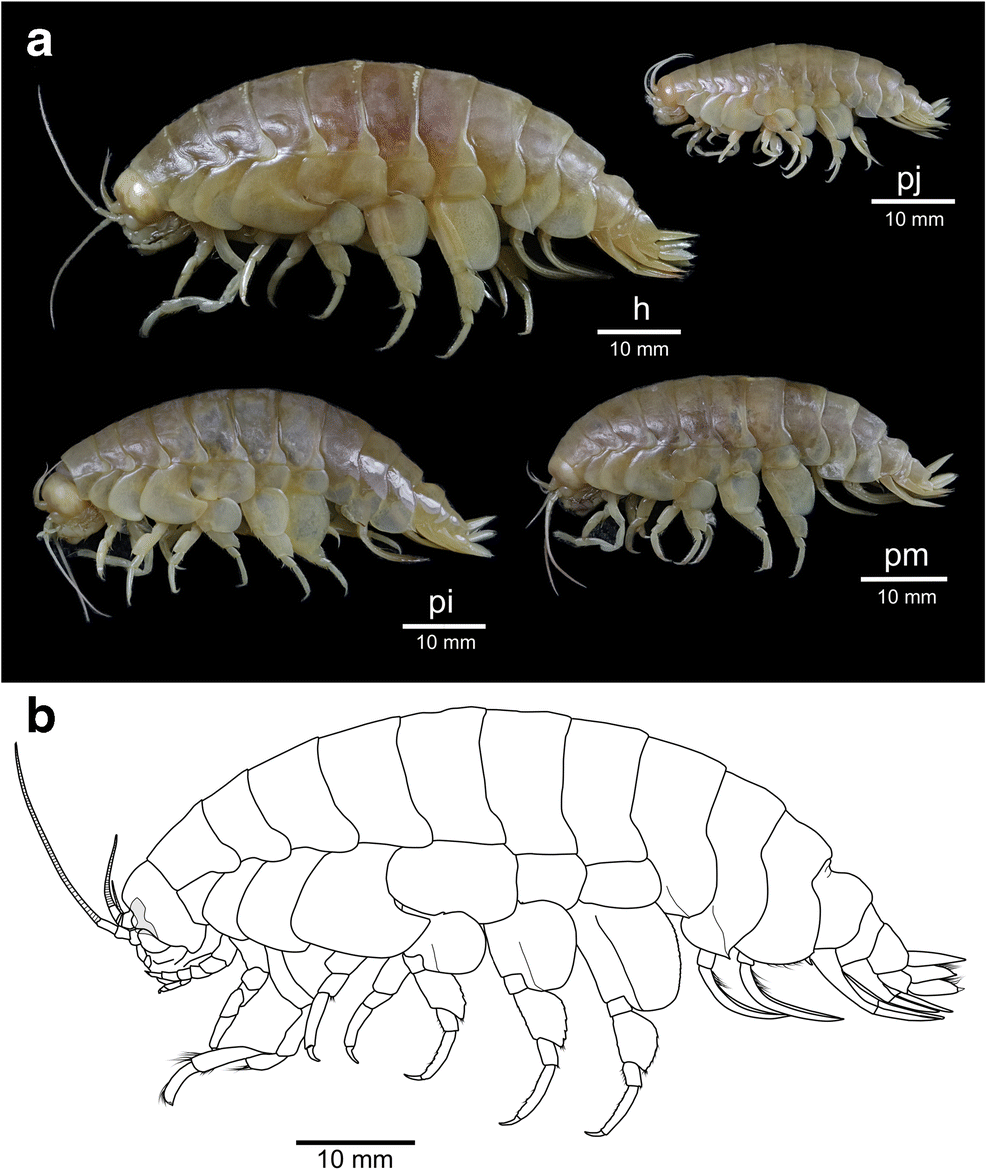

Scientific classification
- Kingdom: Animalia
- Phylum: Arthropoda
- Class: Malacostraca
- Order: Amphipoda
- Family: Eurytheneidae
- Genus: Eurythenes
- Species: E. atacamensis

Binomial name
- Eurythenes atacamensis Weston & Espinosa-Leal, 2021

= Eurythenes atacamensis =

Species of amphipod

Eurythenes atacamensis is a species of amphipod restricted to the Peru-Chile ocean trench.
