= Eurythenes thurstoni =

Scientific classification
- Kingdom: Animalia
- Phylum: Arthropoda
- Class: Malacostraca
- Order: Amphipoda
- Family: Eurytheneidae
- Genus: Eurythenes
- Species: E. thurstoni

Binomial name
- Eurythenes thurstoni (Stoddart & Lowry, 2004)

Species of amphipod

Eurythenes thurstoni is a species of amphipod of the genus Eurythenes. It was first described in 2004 and named after Mike Thurston, a marine biologist specialising in deep-sea amphipods.

E. thurstoni is found in the west South Pacific Ocean and the North and South Atlantic. It can grow up to 46mm long, making it the smallest species of Eurythenes.
