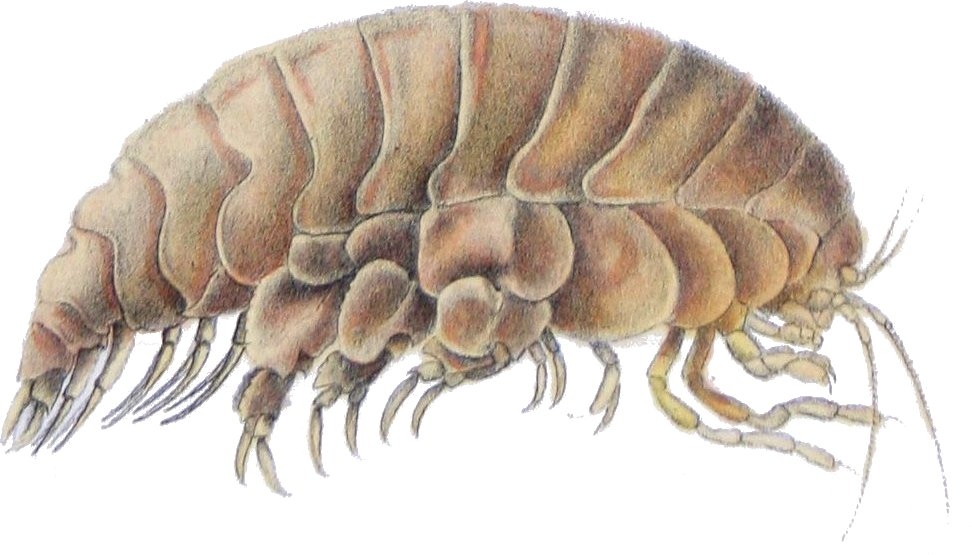

Scientific classification
- Kingdom: Animalia
- Phylum: Arthropoda
- Class: Malacostraca
- Order: Amphipoda
- Family: Eurytheneidae
- Genus: Eurythenes
- Species: E. gryllus

Binomial name
- Eurythenes gryllus (Lichtenstein, 1822)

Synonyms
- Gammarus gryllus Eurytenes magellanicus sensu Lysianassa gryllus

= Eurythenes gryllus =

Species of amphipod

Eurythenes gryllus is a relatively large species of amphipod found worldwide in cold, deep oceans. This widespread and often common species is benthic and lives at depths of 550–7,800 m (1,800–25,600 ft).

It is a predator and scavenger that is fast-swimming and has a highly developed long-range chemoreceptive tracking ability, allowing large numbers to rapidly congregate at carcasses that reach the bottom.

== Description and taxonomy ==
It was first described in 1822 by M. W. Mandt as Gammarus gryllus.

Eurythenes gryllus can grow to c. 15 cm (6 in) long and is red, brown or pale in colour with white eyes. Those of relatively shallow waters only reach about half the length of those found at the largest depths. There are also other morphological differences and genetic studies have revealed several distinct splits, both geographic and depending on depth. The split between the shallow water forms (two widespread lineages found in several oceans) and the deep water forms (two widespread lineages found in several oceans and five restricted lineages each only found in one ocean) is located at a depth of c. 3,000 m (9,800 ft). If each lineage was to be recognized as a valid species, a widespread shallow water lineage found at about 800–2,750 m (2,620–9,020 ft) in both Arctic and Antarctic oceans would be the true Eurythenes gryllus.
