= Astyra =

Scientific classification
- Kingdom: Animalia
- Phylum: Arthropoda
- Clade: Pancrustacea
- Class: Malacostraca
- Order: Amphipoda
- Family: Stilipedidae
- Genus: Astyra; Boeck, 1871

Synonyms
- Chagosia Walker, 1909; Parastyra Pirlot, 1934

Genus of crustaceans

Astyra is a genus of amphipods in the family Stilipedidae. It contains 8 species.

== Species ==
Species accepted by WoRMS:

- Astyra abyssi Boeck, 1871
- Astyra antarctica Andres, 1997
- Astyra bogorovi Birstein & M. Vinogradov, 1955
- Astyra gardineri (Walker, 1909)
- Astyra longidactyla (Pirlot, 1934)
- Astyra longipes Stephensen, 1933
- Astyra mclaughlinae Tandberg & Hughes, 2026
- Astyra zenkevitchi Birstein & M. Vinogradov, 1955
