= Astyra (near Pergamon) =

Ancient town of Aeolis

Coordinates: 39°09′49″N 26°54′24″E

Astyra (Ancient Greek: Ἄστυρα) was a town of ancient Aeolis near to Pergamon.

Its site is tentatively located near Kaplıca, Asiatic Turkey.
