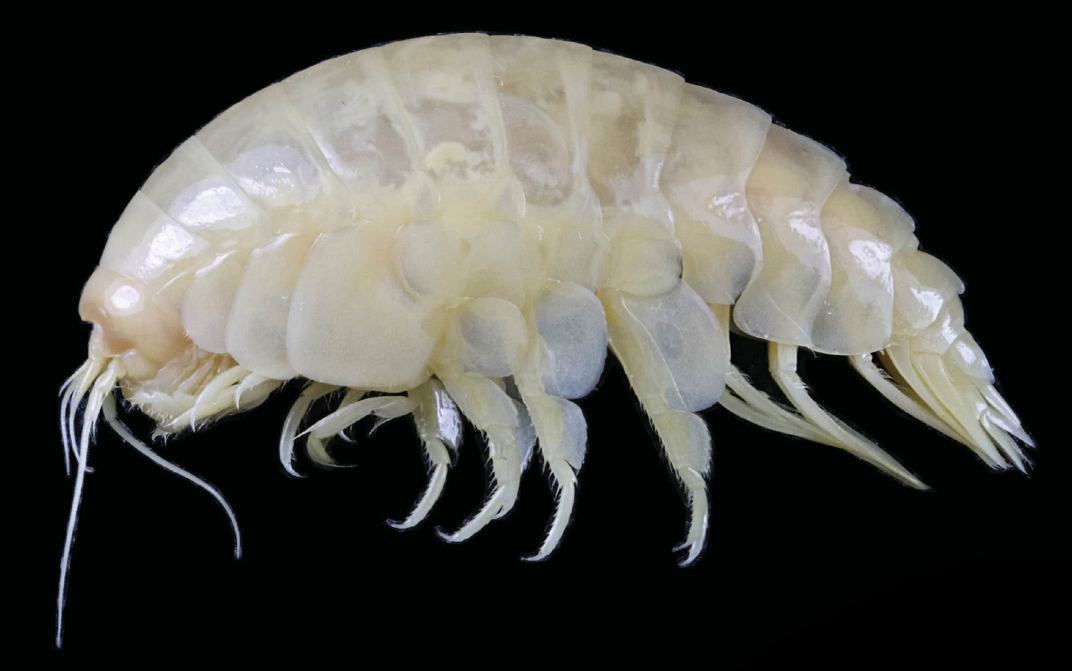

Scientific classification
- Domain: Eukaryota
- Kingdom: Animalia
- Phylum: Arthropoda
- Class: Malacostraca
- Order: Amphipoda
- Family: Eurytheneidae
- Genus: Eurythenes
- Species: E. plasticus

Binomial name
- Eurythenes plasticus Weston, 2020

= Eurythenes plasticus =

Species of amphipod

Eurythenes plasticus is a species of amphipod of the genus Eurythenes, first described in 2020. It was named in reference to the PET plastic found in its stomach, after researchers wanted to highlight the impact of plastic pollution.

Eurythenes plasticus was found at depths between 6,010 m (19,720 ft) and 6,949 m (22,799 ft) deep in the Mariana Trench of the Pacific Ocean in 2014. Researchers from Newcastle University caught four specimens, one of which had plastic particles in its body. The plastic microfibre that was found in its hindgut was 84% similar to PET plastic, showing plastic pollution affects marine organisms even 6,000 metres (20,000 ft) below sea level.
