= Astyria =

Coastal town of ancient Aeolis

Coordinates: 39°35′12″N 26°53′19″E

Astyria (Ancient Greek: Ἀστυρια), also Astyra (Ἀστυρα), was a coastal town of ancient Aeolis on the north shore of the Gulf of Adramyttium.

It is tentatively placed near Kilisetepe, Asiatic Turkey.
