= Édouard Chevreux =

French carcinologist (1846–1931)

Édouard Chevreux (10 November 1846, in Paris – 10 January 1931, in Bône) was a French carcinologist.

Chevreux specialised in the study of Amphipoda, an order of malacostracan crustaceans. With Louis Fage (1883–1964), he was co-author of the section on "Amphipodes" in the Faune de France.

The genera Chevreuxius and Chevreuxiella are named after him, as are numerous crustacean species.

== Selected writings ==
- Sur le Gammarus berilloni catta
- Voyage de la goëlette "Melita" aux Canaries et au Sénégal, 1889–1890, (1891) – Voyage of the schooner "Melita" to the Canary Islands and Senegal, 1889–1890.
- Amphipodes provenant des campagnes de l'Hirondelle (1885–1888), (1900) – Amphipods from the campaigns of the "Hirondelle" (1885–1888).
- Paracyphocaris praedator; type d'un nouveau genre de Lysianassidae, (1905) – "Paracyphocaris praedator"; the type of a new genus of Lysianassidae.
- Amphipodes, (1906) – Amphipods
- Crustacés amphipodes, (1906) – Amphipod crustaceans
- Orchomenella lobata: nouvelle espèce d'amphipode des régions arctiques, (1907) – "Orchomenella lobata", a new species of amphipod from the Arctic regions.
- Campagnes de la Melita; les amphipodes d'Algérie et de Tunisie, (1910) – Campaigns of "Melita"; amphipods from a voyage to Algeria and Tunisia.
- Amphipodes provenant des campagnes scientifiques du prince Albert Ier de Monaco – Amphipods from scientific cruises of Prince Albert I of Monaco.
