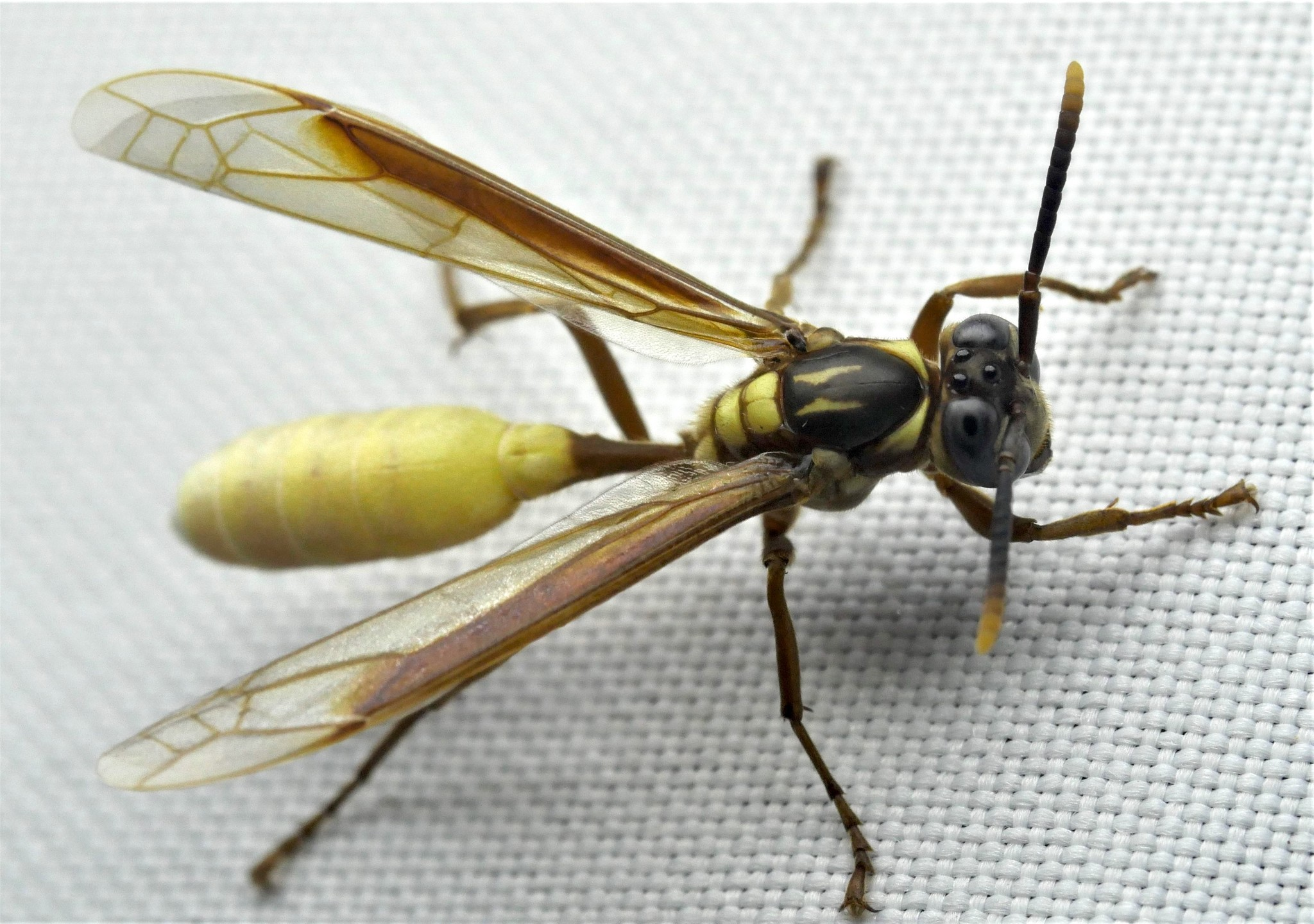
- A. pallens observed in Panama

Scientific classification
- Kingdom: Animalia
- Phylum: Arthropoda
- Clade: Pancrustacea
- Class: Insecta
- Order: Hymenoptera
- Family: Vespidae
- Subfamily: Polistinae
- Tribe: Epiponini
- Genus: Apoica
- Species: A. pallens

Binomial name
- Apoica pallens (Fabricius, 1804)

Synonyms
- Polistes pallens Fabricius, 1804; Apoica pallida var. pallens (Fabricius, 1804)

= Apoica pallens =

Species of wasp

Apoica pallens is a nocturnal eusocial wasp (family Vespidae). It is famous for its swarm based emigration behavior, and is native to the lowlands of Central and northern South America. This species has developed special night vision adaptations to facilitate their night-time swarming and foraging behavior and has important medicinal properties for the Pankararú people of Brazil.

== Taxonomy and phylogenetics ==
Apoica pallens is part of the tribe Epiponini, a group including paper wasps found in neotropical regions. Apoica is one of the basal genera in the tribe. The species is most closely related to Apoica flavissima. Apoica pallens was described by Johan Christian Fabricius in 1804.

== Description and identification ==
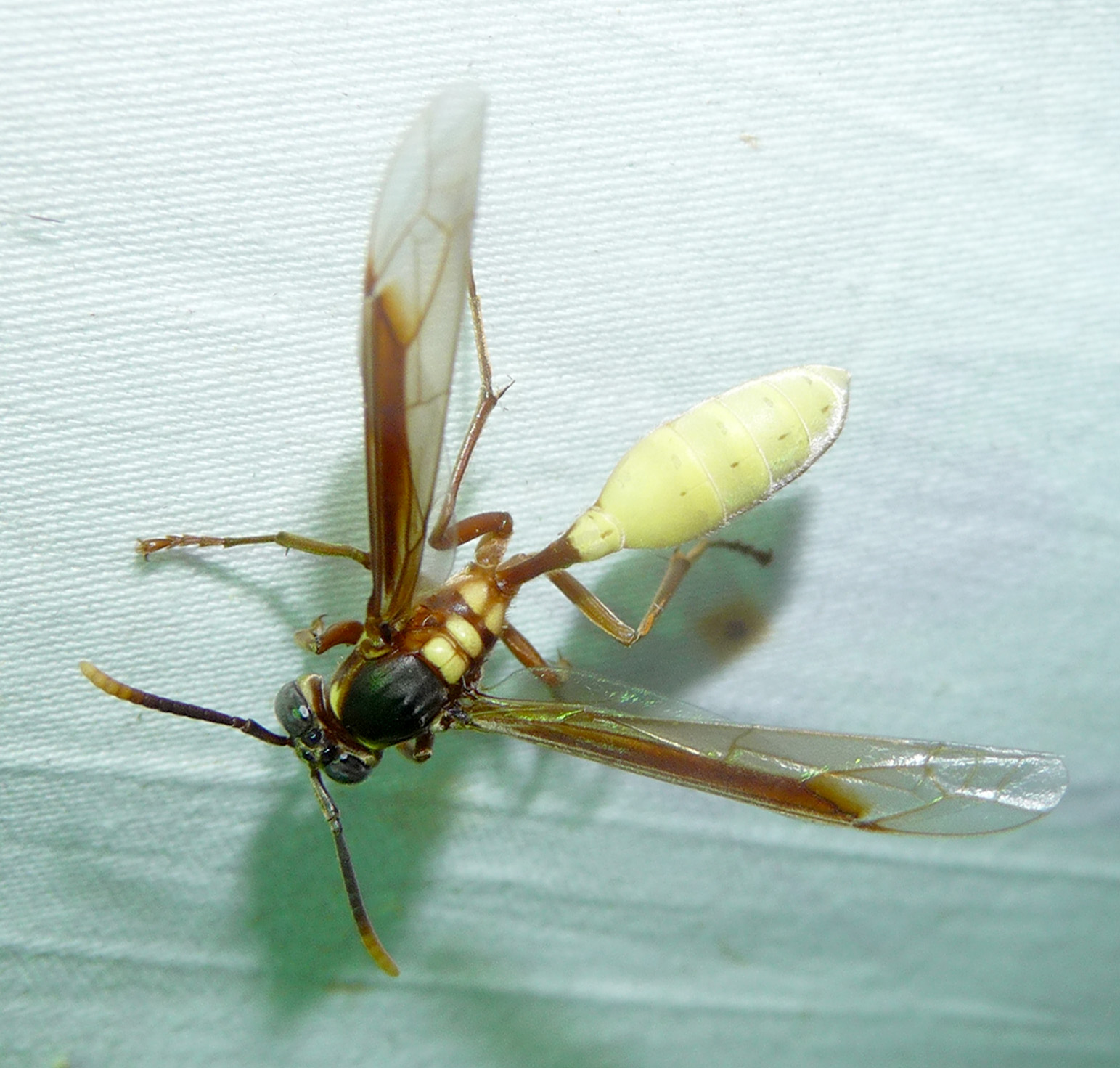
Apoica pallens adult female

Apoica pallens is pale yellow in color. Like other species found within the Epiponini, there is morphological caste differentiation between workers and queens. In Apoica pallens, queens and workers are usually about the same total size, but queens tend to be smaller than workers anteriorly and significantly larger posteriorly. This differentiation is thought to be the result of differences in ovary development.

=== Nest Identification ===
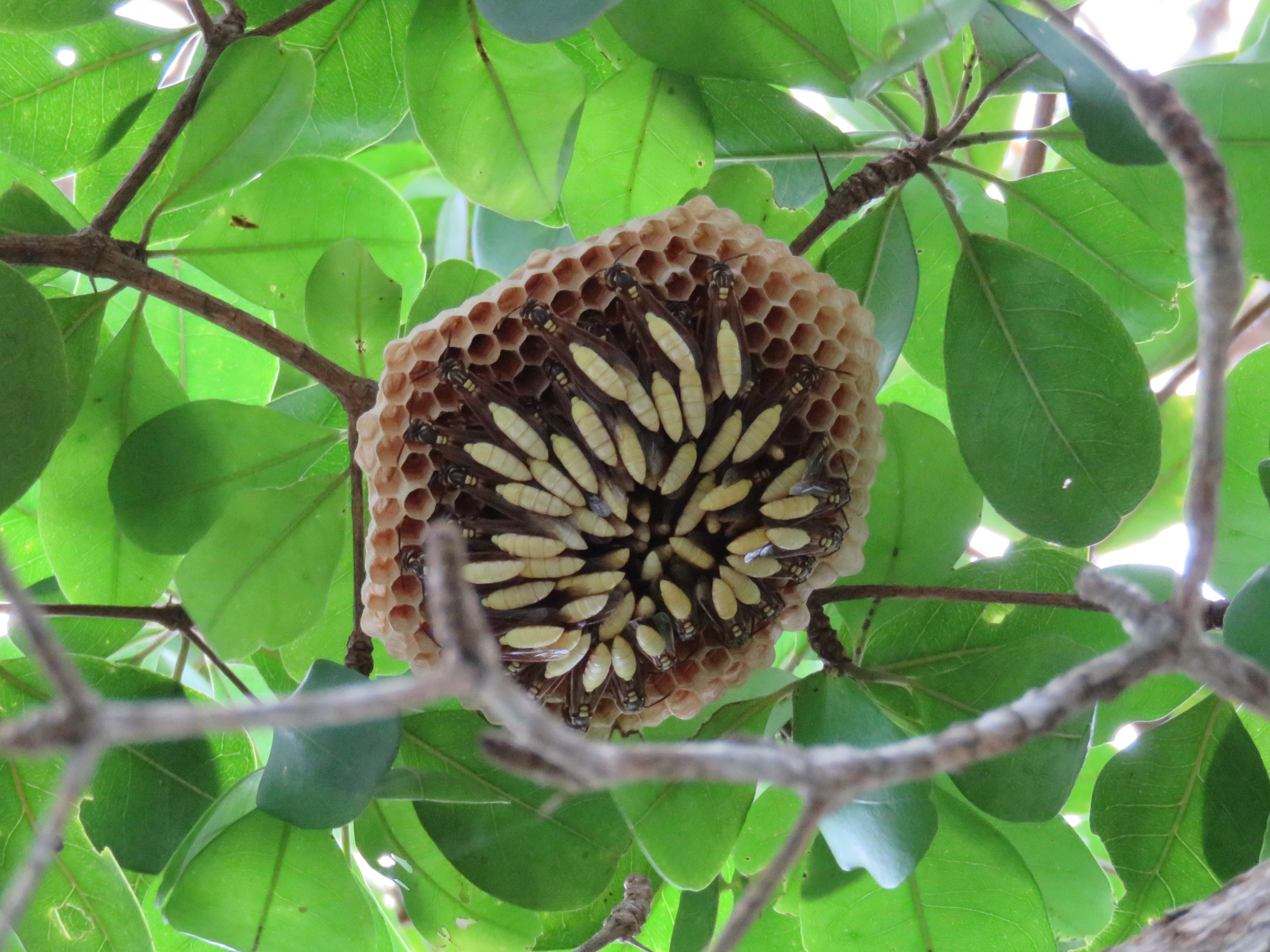
Colony

Nests of Apoica have no enclosing envelope and are composed of a single comb that hangs under the branch. The large nests have a distinctive appearance similar to a straw hat or basket.

== Distribution and habitat ==
Apoica pallens populations are native to the lowlands of Central and northern South America. Generally, they are found in areas of tropical savanna, semi deciduous tropical dry forest, gallery forest, and marsh land. Apoica is one of the prominent genera of the New World Tropics, and is rather abundant.

== Colony cycle ==
Apoica pallens is best known for its unique swarm founding behavior, in which the adult population of a colony abandons an old nest and emigrates to a new site. This has been observed for several reasons. Firstly, as part of normal colony reproduction. And secondly, in response to severe disturbance or destruction of the original nest. Additionally, nest abandonment is sometimes correlated with changing climates, and in the case of Apoica pallens, has been observed more frequently during the dry season. Males follow swarm emigrations and may remain with the newly created colony for the following weeks.

Epiponini are either permanently polygynous or primarily polygynous. In the latter case, queen numbers decrease during the colony cycle which can result in monogyny. Therefore, kinship is considered an important theory for explaining cooperation within the Epiponini tribe.

== Behavior ==
=== Foraging ===
Foraging takes place almost exclusively at night. It is characterized by large numbers of wasps explosively departing from the nest, then quickly returning only to depart again in a similar fashion. As the night progresses there are moderate to heavy levels of return and departures by smaller groups of wasps. The foraging patterns of Apoica pallens are dependent on the moon's cycle: when the moon is new or small, Apoica pallens forages during the first 4 hours after sunset, with another small peak of activity just before dawn as wasps return to the nest. When the moon is waxing, Apoica pallens extends the hours that it forages until individuals are out all night long.

Over time, Apoica pallens have developed adaptations that have enhanced their vision allowing them to forage in these low light intensity conditions. These wasps have larger visual fields compared to those of relatives due to a greater diameter of the rhabdom, a rodlike structure in the eye that is sensitive to light. A. pallens also have increased number of facets instead of larger facets of the eye, which has increased its relative eye size. Although these features help increase the wasp's nocturnal vision, other factors not widely studied also contribute, such as the lateral branching of neurons in the first optic ganglion within the eye.

=== Dominance hierarchy ===
Apoica pallens is a caste species with morphological differentiation between females. These castes are classified as workers and queens, and this morphological distinction is based on the size of ovaries. This special morphology contributes to the reproductive abilities of the queens. The differences between the castes of queens and workers are formed during the larval stage. Queen-destined larvae show faster growth rates in various bodily compartments than worker-destined larvae. This results in individuals with different shapes even though larvae are about the same size.

=== Communication ===
Swarming wasps of the genus Epiponini generally place scent-markings on surfaces around the nest during the formation of swarm clusters. A. pallens, however, has a different mode of communication. Apoica has the Richards' Gland, an endocrine gland that is mechanistically important in signaling swarming. but apparently does not employ it during swarming. Apoica pallens appears to coordinate swarming using an airborne pheromone released from the lower side of the abdomen.

Calling behavior is characterized by the gaster being held rigidly away from the thorax, thus exposing the sternal glands. The exposure of these chemical releasing glands has led to the hypothesis that this calling behavior releases airborne pheromones that signal to swarm members, so they know to begin the migration.

== Kin selection ==
The polygeny exhibited in Apoica pallens is a potential conflict of interest within colonies. This would seem to lead to relatively low relatedness between individuals within a colony, and therefore the incentive to protect shared genes would also be reduced. However, relatedness between individuals in colonies of Epiponini shows that kinship is actually rather high. The reasoning behind this is that as colonies become more developed the number of queens is reduced, and the relatedness between mothers and daughters increases. Therefore, kinship is considered an important theory for explaining cooperation within the Epiponini tribe.

=== Costs and benefits of sociality ===
An interesting aspect of the genus Apocia is that while it is described as highly social, it has fewer caste differences than other genera of highly social wasp species. This is likely because this genus' morphological caste differentiation was a secondary evolutionary step in sociality, representing a switch between size differentiation between castes to morphological differentiation between castes. The highly structured social nature of this species contributes to the advantages of social behaviors such as their distinctive swarm founding and physical nest defense.

=== Worker-queen conflict ===
In Apoica pallens, the nature of queen–worker morphological differences is determined at the larval stage. Queen larvae have different growth rates of various bodily compartments compared to larvae that will become workers. This generates castes based on different morphologies, rather than based on different sizes. Polygyny in Epiponini has no intolerant primary egglayer queen. Instead reproduction is performed by several tolerant female queens. The queens participate in a society of inclusive fitness rather than in a struggle for direct fitness. The role of policing is adopted by sterile workers, who select among the queen larvae. Due to this system, there is in fact minimal conflict between the two castes.

== Human importance ==
=== Uses in folk medicine ===
Folk medicine is prominent in various areas of Brazil. The incorporation of insects into folk remedies is common, and specific insects serve distinct purposes. Medicinal insects are the focus of certain healing methods targeted to treat ailments, serving as drug resources that come from nature. The nests of Apoica pallens, in particular, is known to be significant in the practices of the indigenous Pankarare and also the rural people of Brazil. Nests of these wasps are burned and the smoke released is inhaled in order to heal stroke. Furthermore, when the presence of evil is suspected in a native's life, they must bath in this smoke of the burning nest as treatment. In Matinha dos Pretos, pieces of the nest can also be boiled in water to make a tea that serves as treatment for asthma.

== Interaction with other species ==
=== Diet ===
Apoica pallens has been found to collect various arthropods including flies, caterpillars, and beetles. It also collects pollen and nectar from banana blossoms. In addition, this species practices brood cannibalism, where the adults will eat some of the brood if their own nutritional needs are not met. Generally, several adults will divide up a single larva. In addition, adults will exchange food via trophallaxis.

=== Defense ===
Apoica pallens displays active, rather than chemical defense behavior. During the day, when adult individuals are not participating in swarming behavior, they cover the comb face of the nest several layers thick. The wasps on the outer layer of the comb face outward. This leaves them vigilant to the approach of predatory ants trying to reach the interior of the nest. This is thought to be a more passive defense than an active one, since the presence of the adults in this formation is in and of itself a deterrent to parasites and predators. It has also been hypothesized that the advantages of this protective formation during the daylight hours are what led to the selection of the nocturnal foraging and swarming behavior seen in this species.
