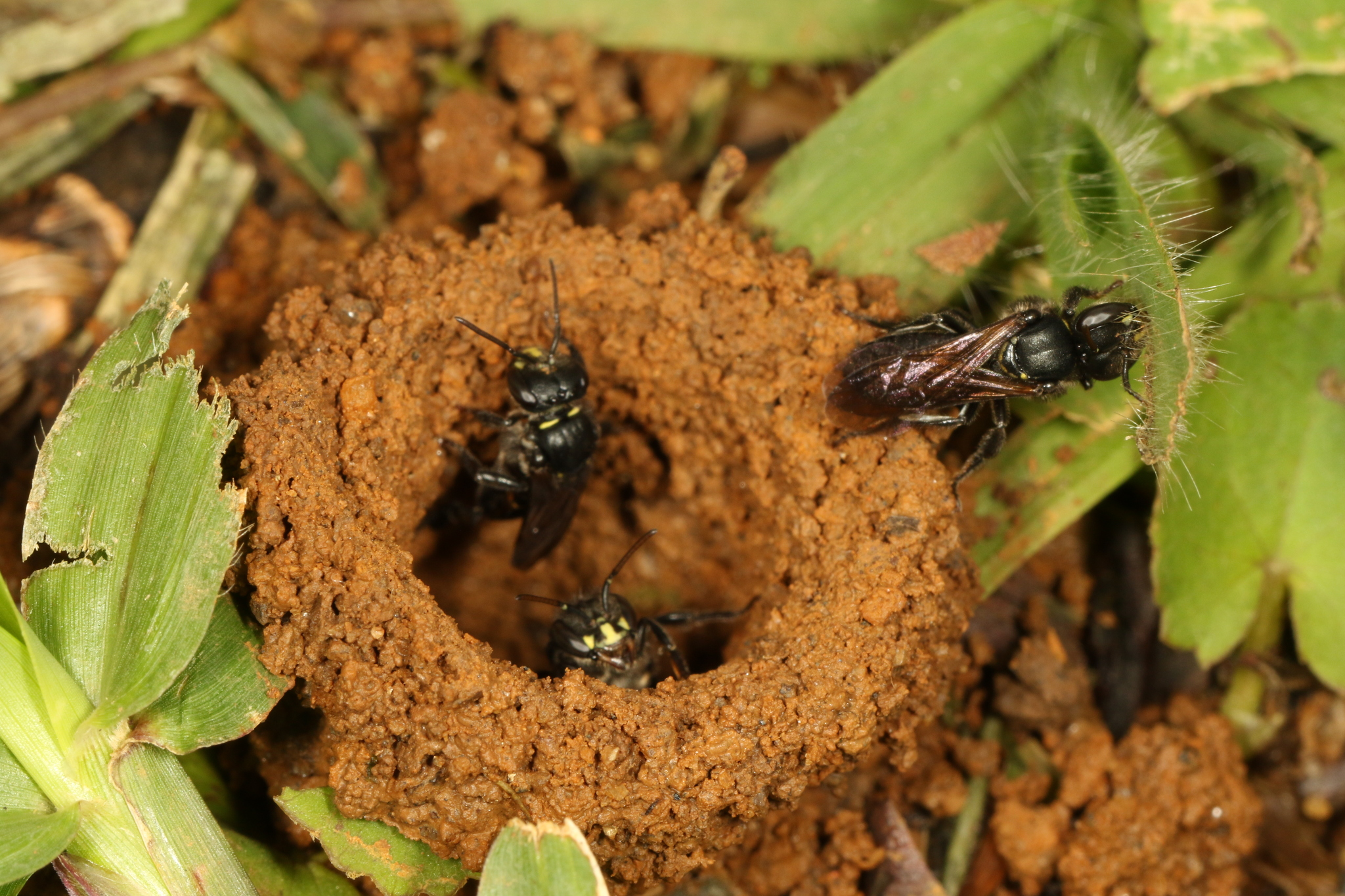
- Schwarziana quadripunctata at the nest

Scientific classification
- Kingdom: Animalia
- Phylum: Arthropoda
- Clade: Pancrustacea
- Class: Insecta
- Order: Hymenoptera
- Family: Apidae
- Genus: Schwarziana
- Species: S. quadripunctata

Binomial name
- Schwarziana quadripunctata (Lepeletier, 1836)
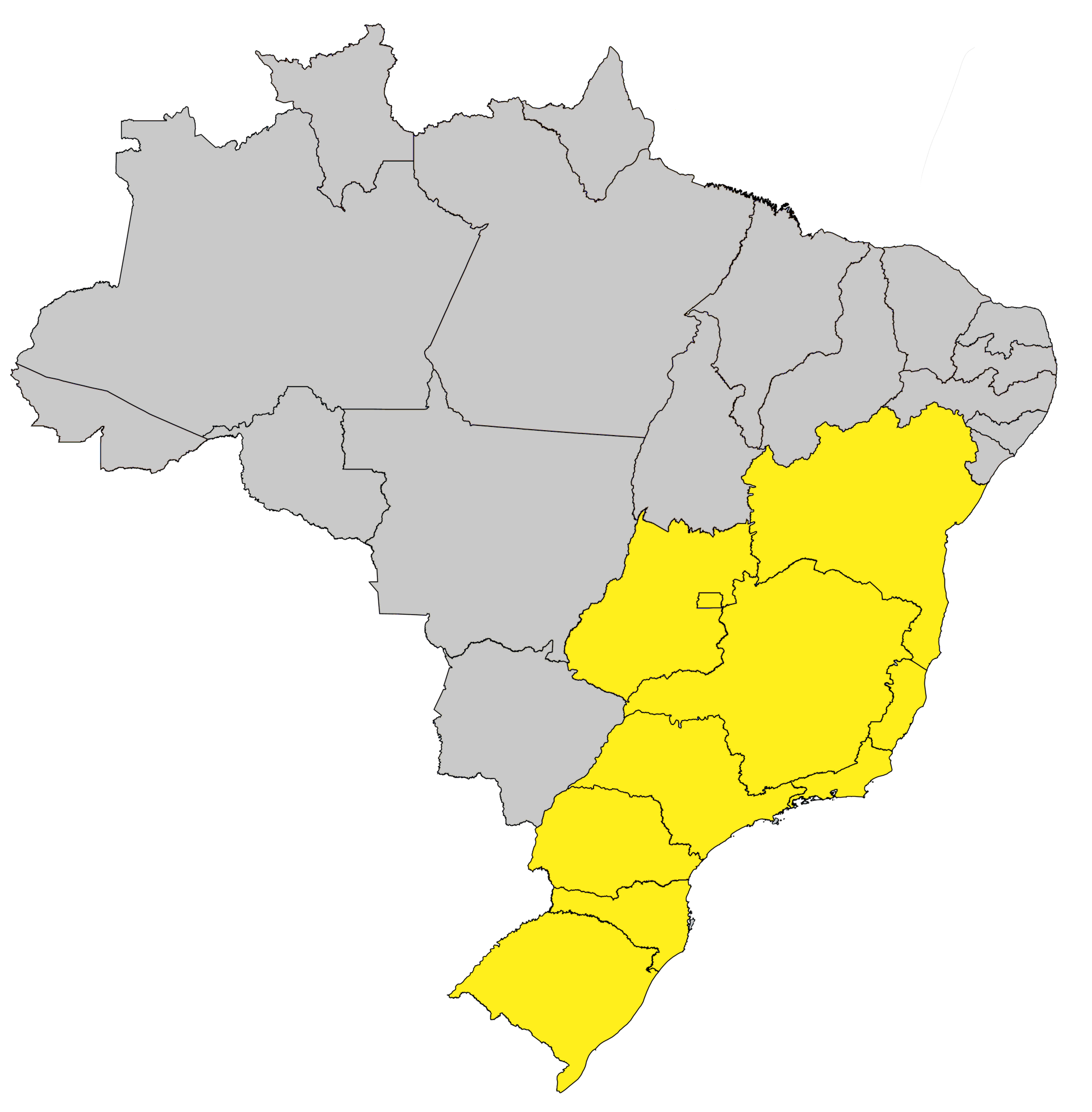
- Distribution of S. quadripunctata in Brazil

= Schwarziana quadripunctata =

Species of bee

Schwarziana quadripunctata is a small, stingless bee found in a stretch of the South American Amazon from Goiás, Brazil, through Paraguay, to Misiones, Argentina. This highly eusocial insect constructs earthen nests in the subterranean level of the subtropical environment, an unusual feature among other stingless bees. The species ranges in sizes from 6.0 to 7.5 millimetres (1/4 to 9/32 in) and feeds on a diverse diet of flowering plants found abundantly on the forest floor, including guacatonga (Casearia sylvestris) and the mistletoe species Struthanthus concinnus.

== Taxonomy and phylogeny ==
Schwarziana quadripunctata was first described by the French entomologist and former president of the French Entomologist Society Amédéé Louis Michel le Peletier in 1836. Although originally placed in the genus Trigona, more recent taxonomic evaluations have since placed it under its current genus, following the 1943 work of Padre J.S. Moure, occasionally referred to as "the Father of Brazilian Bee Taxonomy". However, some still consider the term Schwarziana as a subgenus rather than genus and instead incorrectly classify it under the closely related genus Plebeia.

The closest relative of S. quadripunctata is the species Schwarziana mourei, determined through morphological and genetic evidence collected in the early twenty-first century. Until recently (2015) it was believed that these were the only two existing species under the genus Schwarziana in the world. However, two more species were discovered in the high altitude environment of South America – S. bocainensis in southeastern Brazil and S. chapadensis in central Brazil.

== Description ==
=== Bees ===
The stingless bee S. quadripunctata varies in size from 6.0 to 7.5 millimetres (1/4 to 9/32 in). Worker bees and dwarf queens tend to be on the lower end of this spectrum while queens tend to lie on the higher end. Dwarf queens and workers tend to have an average weight of about 30 mg, but have been known to weigh as much as 40 mg or as little as 22 mg. Mated queens (those in charge of the nest) are, in comparison, much larger. The average queen bee weighs in at about 130 mg. However, some have been measured at over 160 mg, about a quarter of the weight of an average paperclip. Colonies contain a larger queen with greater fecundity than dwarf queens, causing the size discrepancy between the two. Unusual for most other eusocial insects, worker bees and dwarf queen bees tend to be similar in weight and size. The bees have a pale coloration of brown or reddish-brown with occasional yellow markings on the head. They maintain a punctate thorax and abdomen and a dorsal thoracic area sporting a few hairs. Glands are present on the head and thorax. The glands are larger in the heads of general worker bees and larger in the thorax for nursing worker bees.

=== Nests ===
Nests are entirely underground on the subtropical floor and consist of vast and expansive cavities. Each nest is occupied by a single colony consisting of an individual queen and several thousand workers. Brood cells are arranged in spiral combs, each cell housing only one individual. Cells housing queens are typically much larger than the surrounding cells housing males and workers.

== Distribution and habitat ==
The distribution of S. quadripunctata ranges from the central highlands of Brazil down towards the northern edge of Argentina on the eastern side of South America. Altitudes can reach up to fifteen hundred meters (1,500 metres (4,921 ft)) in some areas. Lying so near the equator, temperatures are fairly warm year-round, averaging twenty-five degrees Celsius (25 °C (77 °F)).

Nests are built into the fertile topsoil of the subtropical rainforests. The niche breadth of S. quadripunctata includes a wide variety of flowering plants that overlaps with many other eusocial bees native to the area, including members of the tribes Meliponini and Trigoni, as well as Africanized honeybees. Each nest features a single, simple rounded entrance, as opposed to a triangular entrance or one with a tube network, several layers, or multiple openings. S. quadripunctata nest entrances in São Paulo, Brazil consisted of an average entrance area of 14.5 square millimetres (3/128 sq in), relatively small compared to the 2.1 square millimetres (1/256 sq in) body of the bee. This may account for the lower traffic levels of the stingless bee through the entryway, an average of 17.4 bees per minute per nest.

Members of this species are fairly common in their large South American region, with nests containing over several thousand members each. However, their population is believed to have declined by nearly sixty-five percent (65%) over the past few decades due to competition with the introduced Africanized honeybees along with human deforestation. This decline is projected to continue into the future.

== Colony cycle ==
Colonies are founded by the swarming of individuals consisting of a single queen followed by several thousand worker bees. This can only be achieved if both the queen and her workers “align” themselves towards the same goal in production of fertile females. Once a colony has been established, housing combs are produced by the workers, with larger ones allocated to potential queen larvae and the more numerous, normal-sized cells produced for the worker bee eggs. Dwarf queens are also reared in worker cells. Queen cells are typically located near the edge or periphery of the comb while worker and dwarf queen cells are randomly aggregated towards the center. Although less than one percent (1%) of dwarf queens were seen to emerge from worker cells, they account for nearly eighty-six percent (86%) of the total queen population.

A colony will continue to grow in size until the queen bee dies or swarms to a new location to begin a new colony. In rare cases, two queens may swarm to the same location, due to balanced attractiveness, to begin a new colony. In these special cases, the younger queen typically produces more eggs than the older queen and begins to take over the colony, phasing out the older member.

== Behavior ==
=== Dominance hierarchy ===
In the stingless bee S. quadripunctata, as in many social insects, queens reign at the top of the dominance hierarchy, followed by dwarf queens and finally workers. However, dwarf queens have been observed to lead nearly one in five colonies. Although, this accounts for only seventeen percent (17%) of dwarf queens and is significantly lower than the rate at which they were reared (constituting 86% of all females). This does show, however, that becoming a dwarf queen can be beneficial.

Dwarf queens have a lower fecundity and reproduction rate than normal queens. This appears to be the consequence of a reduced egg-laying rate and a lower average ovary weight. A queen’s ovary is nearly four times larger than a dwarf queen’s.

In some aspects, however, workers occasionally have a slight advantage over queens and dwarf queens. Worker bees are in charge of delivering food supplies to developing larvae. Thus, workers can force underdeveloped dwarf queen larvae and queen larvae to be converted into a worker bee, or to be eradicated completely, through extreme limitations of their food rations.

=== Division of labor ===
The division of labor often, in some way or another, reflects the evolutionary sex ratio of a species. This is especially true in S. quadripunctata, where worker bees can outnumber queens by about one thousand to one (1000:1).

The main purpose of the colonial queen, or gyne, is to lay eggs within the brood cells housed in the combs. They also play a vital role in the establishment of new colonies. Using their attractive senses, queen bees are able to lead a swarm of workers and the occasional dwarf queen to new locations. Until fairly recently, it was hypothesized that these dwarf, or miniature, queens were the result of developmental mistakes. However, through Tom Wenseleers' "Caste Conflict Hypothesis," it is believed that dwarf queens are evolutionarily advantageous in that they develop in order to avoid becoming a worker bee. Their role was found to become the head of a colony in the absence of viable, full-sized queens.

The roles of the worker bee in S. quadripunctata include the maintenance and protection of larvae (queen, dwarf, or worker) placed within the brood cells. They are responsible for delivering nutrients to the developing larvae until they hatch. Worker bees are also responsible for accompanying the establishments of new colonies by a queen.

=== Reproduction and reproductive suppression ===
Unlike typical honeybees, which practice multiple mating, stingless bees have been suspected of single mating between drones and queen bees. This, along with the consequential pairing of the high relatedness rates within colonies of S. quadripunctata, serves to explain the high degree of kin selection among stingless bees.

After a female queen mates and lays her brood, the worker bees package them into specifically designed cells – queens in larger “royal” cells and workers and dwarf queens in smaller ones. Each cell is then capped with a layer of wax-like substance. With the queen’s role in production complete, the combs are left to the tending of worker bees, which distribute nutrients and vital resources to the growing larvae. With so much control, worker bees occasionally discriminate or display reproductive suppression tendencies against dwarf queens by either uncapping the cell before the dwarf hatches, halting the supply of nutrients, or killing the newly developed individual upon emergence of the cell.

=== Communication ===
A major strength of any eusocial insect is the ability to communicate amongst one another. Often, this method of communication comes in the form of chemical signals between members of the same colony. In particular, cuticular hydrocarbon levels are thought to be of great importance to S. quadripunctata communication and can vary greatly according to age, sex and caste.

Hydrocarbons in the stingless bee can vary in length from nonadecane with nineteen carbons to tritriacontane with thirty-three carbons, as discovered in a study conducted by Nunes et al. (2009). It was found that cuticles of older worker bees contained higher concentrations of heptacosene (C27) and hentriacontene (C31) than younger workers and virgin queens, indicating that these hydrocarbons play an important role in nest mate recognition. It was also found that younger stingless bees lacked some of the major hydrocarbons found in older individuals, most likely due a result of less exposure to the wax present in the nest. The relative concentrations of hydrocarbons in members of a colony differed between unrelated sites, alluding to the hypothesis that the wax of each nest contains a unique chemical blend from which the developing larvae absorb.

=== Navigation ===
Along with, and often closely related to, communication, effective navigation within an environment is vital to the successful reproduction of eusocial insects. Although some organisms’ methods of navigation seem quite apparent (i.e. through modes of sight and scent) the navigational system of Schwarziana quadripunctata had remained elusive until quite recently. It has been determined that S. quadripunctata navigates, like many other bees, through the use of magnetoreception – utilizing magnetic fields in the atmosphere to recognize differences in location, altitude and directionality.

This notion of magnetic navigational skills was first observed in a 2005 study conducted by Esquivel et al. on a S. quadripunctata nest near Rio de Janeiro, Brazil. The study applied various levels of applied magnetic fields across the entrance of the nest. The exiting angles (both vertical and horizontal) of the individual bees were then measured as they emerged from the nest. The primary control experiment confirmed that the majority of the nest had a preferential exiting angle in accordance with the local geomagnetic field. Over the course of four months, the study group measured the two angles in comparison to various magnitudes of applied magnetic fields and compared them to observed angles in natural geomagnetic fields. A significant correlation was found between the two, definitively showing that the stingless bee relies on magnetoreception for navigational purposes.

A similar 2005 study by Lucano et al. observed the same nest of Schwarziana quadripunctata to determine the location of the bodily magnetoreceptors. After separating the head, thorax, abdomen and antennae of a dozen stingless bees, magnetic fields were applied to each body part. It was found that the head, thorax, and abdomen present a diamagnetic contribution (inducing a magnetic field opposite to the applied field), while the antennae displayed a paramagnetic one (inducing a magnetic field in the same direction as the applied field). The antennae of the stingless bee, therefore, exist as a complex sensory organ used for orientation and navigation through the combined use of thousands of hair-shaped sensilla.

=== Mating behavior ===
Like most eusocial insects, S. quadripunctata reproduction relies heavily on the established hierarchy and level of environmental quality. Usually, the physogastric queen lays the majority of the eggs. However, the miniature (or dwarf) queens may also lay fertile eggs, although they tend to be fewer in number and smaller in size.

As multiple virgin queens approach the age of reproductive success, they begin to accumulate the reddish-brown pigmentation associated with adult members. At this time, male workers will begin individually courting them on the layers of wax on the comb or on the comb itself. Courting occurs in the form of buccal contact between the males and females through a lateral hole in the thorax of the female. Some virgin queens will begin manipulating the cerumen (wax) layers in preparation for the construction of brood cells by the workers. If the physogastric queen deems a virgin queen is too much of a sexual threat, it may be imprisoned in a specialized cell in groups of one to five along with one or two worker bees. This is done in order to limit interference to the cell provisioning and oviposition processes of the physogastric queen.

Future queen eggs are positioned near the periphery of the comb in larger, specialized cells while workers and dwarf queens (in a ratio of about 1000 to 6, respectively) are randomly placed about the interior in smaller brood cells. The eggs are cared for by the workers.

== Kin selection ==
=== Genetic relatedness within colonies ===
Since S. quadripunctata reproduction typically relies on a single queen, genetic relatedness within individual colonies is expected to be relatively high. In an analyzation of the genetic relatedness within four separate colonies with an average of eight different worker genotypes per colony, an average relatedness of .792 was found among worker bees within each colony. This value has been replicated in several studies, including one conducted by Toth et al. (2001) among eighteen colonies in Brazil (relatedness value = 0.75 ± 0.04 among worker bees). In the same study, males (being haploid) had a relatedness value of 1.0 to queens, while workers only shared approximately fifty percent (50%) of the queen’s genes (relatedness value = 0.48). Relatedness between workers and males were also about half (relatedness value = 0.51). The data was collected and calculated on the evaluation of seven polymorphic microsatellite loci, each with several attributable alleles.

=== Kin selection and discrimination ===
Kin recognition often goes hand in hand with communication. For instance, researchers compared the relative amounts of various hydrocarbon compounds present in the epicuticles, serving as a chemical odor to other individuals, of S. quadripunctata. The study showed that a diverse array of these chemicals were present in each member. They then charted these hydrocarbon differences and found a distinct separation according to colony location, age, sex, and hierarchal position. In particular, older workers, which are in charge of colony protection, had higher concentrations of the alkenes heptacosene and hentriacontene. It was thus deduced that these alkenes were vital parts of kin recognition. Some of these essential hydrocarbons were also found to be lacking in younger individuals, alluding to the idea that the chemicals are acquired as the exposure to the waxy comb, specific to each colony, increases.

One case sought to further test the importance of hydrocarbon concentration. In a group of related worker bees, half were injected with an alien alkene. Aggressive behaviors towards these individuals by the non-injected worker bees increased significantly. They were unable to be recognized by their unique odor and were subsequently treated as intruders.

The recognition of various odors associated with hydrocarbon concentrations is also responsible for the ability of worker bees to determine the location of their home nest.

=== Worker-queen conflict ===
Many stingless bee colonies, those of S. quadripunctata included, are repopulated by a single queen who mates. This should, in theory, create a conflicting rift between queens and the worker bees due to variations in genetic relatedness. Queens produce haploid males that are genetically identical to them. In contrast, workers only share fifty percent (50%) of their genes with males, leading to an evolutionary conflict of interest. However, worker bees were not observed to increase their aggressive behaviors towards newly reproduced males.

A few possible explanations arose from the study in an attempt to explain this lack of aggression. One hypothesis couples the production of males in a stingless bee society with an increase in food reproduction. In this case, the benefit of a stable diet would overcome the workers’ desire to produce females. Another possibility is that aggression is not beneficial no matter the sex being produced. The aggression between workers and queens may just be residual left over from a past evolutionary benefit.

=== Queen-queen conflict ===
More distinctive to the intra-communal dynamics of the Schwarziana quadripunctata nest is the existence of multiple statuses of queen – the physogastric queen (those that are larger in size and more involved in reproduction) and multiple dwarf queens. The number of these dwarf queens varies in accordance to resource availability, colony conditions, and the physical state of the current physogastric queen. However, the dwarf queens are typically produced year round, with several hatching simultaneously.

Mate attractiveness to the newly born queens coincides with pigmentation. The more brightly colored queens were more likely to lay more eggs than their paler counterparts. As the newborn queens begin to age, pigmentation increased as well as the number of courtships from male stingless bees. In the case of an encounter between the physogastric queen and the newborn “virgin” queens, the larger queen may initiate buccal contact with the smaller queen. A rapidly growing virgin queen may incite her own imprisonment in specialized prison chambers. In one case, an abnormally large and pigmented virgin queen became overly agitated in her prison cell. The release of this queen prompted the interruption of brood cell construction, though the physogastric queen maintained her normal routine. Within a couple days, the virgin queen was found dead and was being carried off by workers.

The defining aspect of queen-queen conflict appears to rely heavily on size differentiation. The dominant queen can reach sizes over three times larger than that of the dwarf queens. However, multiple queen production serves a vital role in the survival of the colony, ensuring that, should one queen unexpectedly succumb to injury or illness, another one is readily available to take its place in maintaining the nest.

== Diet ==
The subtropical environment of the South American Amazon provides a vast array of dietary options for a stingless bee such as S. quadripunctata. With such a densely populated niche of pollinating insects, it remains of utmost importance to balance competition and resource acquisition. It is often adverse weather conditions, rather than complete depletion of pollen and nectar from the resource, that terminate the length of harvesting by the stingless bees.

In total, S. quadripunctata utilizes over 35 different species of flowering plants. Many of these produce a large quantity of flower material, limiting interspecies and intraspecies competition. Over ten percent (10%) of their diet comes from the species Casearia sylvestris (called guaçatonga) and Myrcia tomentosa (commonly referred to as goiaba-brava) alone. Other popular flowering plants comprising their diet include Mikania catharinensis, Piptocarpha oblonga (or braço-do-rei in Brazil), and Cordia trichoclada.

== Defense ==
The entrance to a stingless bee nest serves as a particularly vulnerable area. It serves as the threshold that separates the viability of the species from the outside world. The size of the entryway is critical. It must remain large enough to allow the easy to-and-fro passage of the bee, yet small enough to dissuade potential predators (such as orb spiders) from causing havoc inside the nest. Evolutionarily, a size compromise must be reached.

The nest entrance of Schwarziana quadripunctata consists of a simple, round opening. This is a distinct comparison to the complex entryways consisting of layered entrances or closable doorways observed in some other related species. Through the observation and measurement of several S. quadripunctata nests near São Paulo, Brazil, entrances were discovered to have an average area of 14.5 square millimetres (3/128 sq in). In comparison to the average stingless bee having a body area of 2.1 square millimetres (1/256 sq in), this gives a ratio of 6.8 opening to bee. This smaller entrance provides more than enough space for the relatively low enter and exit traffic of 17.4 individuals per minute.

Schwarziana quadripunctata appears to rely heavily on the small entryway size as their main source of defense. Although three to five guards are typically seen guarding the entryway, they act in a fairly non-aggressive manner (dipping inside the inner entrance) when presented with an intruder. It is speculated they may act as an alarm for the rest of the nest rather than an attack force.
