= Plebeia remota =

Scientific classification
- Kingdom: Animalia
- Phylum: Arthropoda
- Clade: Pancrustacea
- Class: Insecta
- Order: Hymenoptera
- Family: Apidae
- Clade: Corbiculata
- Tribe: Meliponini
- Genus: Plebeia
- Species: P. remota

Binomial name
- Plebeia remota (Holmberg, 1903)
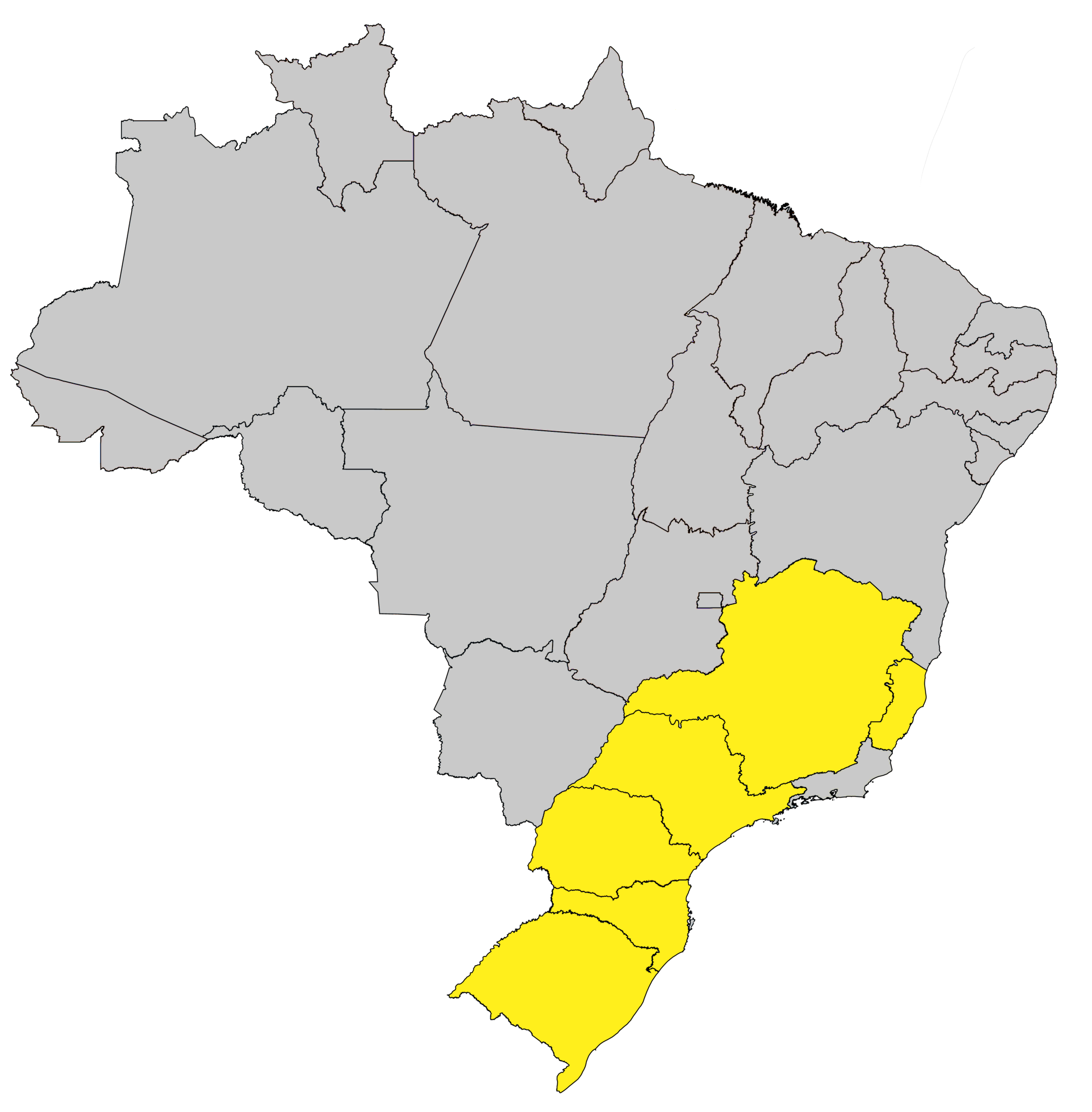
- Range of P. remota in Brazil

Species of bee

Plebeia remota is a species of stingless bee that is in the family Apidae and tribe Meliponini. Bees of the species are normally found in a few states in southern Brazil and their nests can be found in tree cavities. Depending on the region, P. remota may have a different morphology and exhibit different behaviors. The bee's diet consists of nectar and pollen that are collected intensely from a few sources. Researchers have conducted a multitude of studies analyzing the changes that occur in the colony during reproductive diapause and what happens during the provisioning and oviposition process or POP.

== Taxonomy and phylogeny ==
P. remota is a member of the order Hymenoptera, which is the insect order comprising bees, wasps and ants. Within Hymenoptera, it belongs to the family Apidae. This bee belongs in the tribe Meliponini. The greatest number of Meliponini species reside in the Neotropics where there are about 420 species known. Within the genus Plebeia, there are about 40 species described. Like the other species in Meliponini, P. remota is a stingless bee.

== Description and identification ==
P. remota is a small bee, roughly about 3–6 mm in length. It shows characteristics of bees in the genus Plebeia which include whitish or yellow stripes on the face and thorax. Like other species in Meliponini, it exhibits a trigoniform body structure, sparse hair and reduced wing venation.

The nests of P. remota normally consist of a small, propolis entrance that is only as large as the head of the worker bee, a pile of 8-10 horizontal combs away from the entrance, honey pots and pollen pots that are located close to the combs and entrance respectively, and sites for resin storage and waste materials. The waste materials are disposed of during the daytime.

Inside the nest

== Distribution and habitat ==
The distribution range of P. remota is small compared to other bee species. They are normally found in southern Brazil in the states of Minas Gerais, São Paulo, Paraná, Santa Catarina, and Rio Grande do Sul. The nests of P. remota are usually found in tree cavities; however, finding them in nature is difficult since the size of the entrance is very small. The nests of P. remota can house up to 5,000 bees.

In one study it was shown that two populations of P. remota, one from Cunha in São Paulo state (SP) and the other from Prudentópolis in Paraná state (PR), had several differences in both morphology and behavior. Francisco and his colleagues believe that these differences are caused by the fact that the climate in SP and PR are very distinct. These differences may have caused the selection of different phenotypic characteristics of P. remota in each region. They observed that colonies from Cunha construct an extra layer of cerumen, or wax, in their nests in the shape of a roof during the reproductive period and that the duration of their diapause is shorter. It has also been observed that the external morphology of the queen's scutellum, the composition of the Dufour's gland secretions of queens and workers, the flight activity of foragers and the regulation of the nest temperature are different between these two populations. What is even more interesting is that during this study that lasted a decade, the two populations were kept in the same place that allowed for genes to be exchanged easily. However, there was no gene flow between the colonies and the high rates of classification indicated that there was no hybridization between the two groups and they maintained their original characteristics.

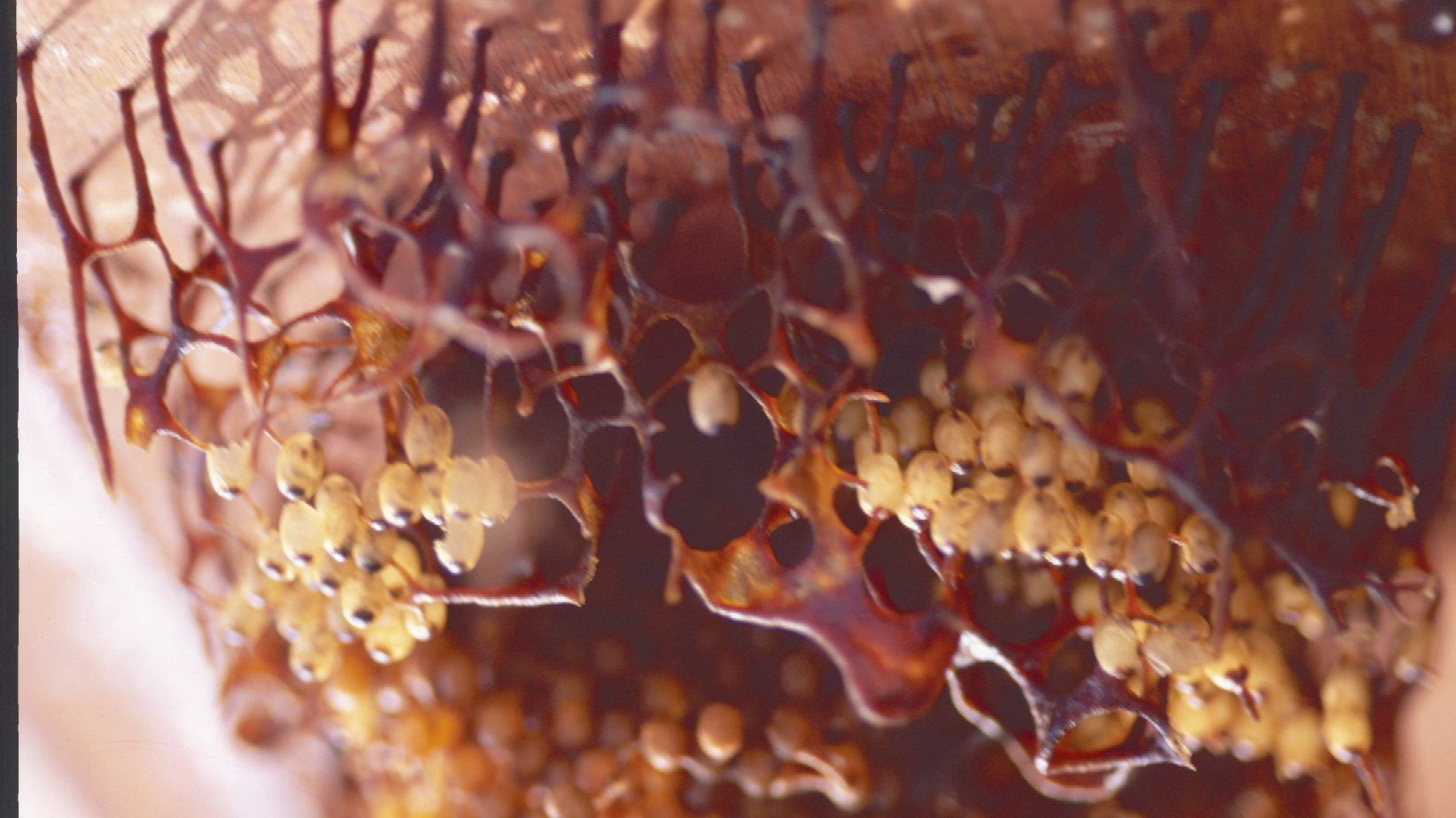
Nest of the Plebeia Remota

== Colony cycle ==
The majority of the time P. remota queens produce few young virgin queens, also known as gynes, a year. As such, the number of new colonies formed is relatively small. The gynes that live after emerging from their cells have the chance to form their own swarm and then leave the nest. Another equally viable option is that the gynes would just take over the nest once the current queen dies. The gynes that form their own colonies do not go far from where they were born; thus, there tend to be clusters of nests where the individuals in that area are related to each other.

== Behavior ==
=== Hygienic behavior ===
Compared with other species of stingless bees such as Melipona quadrifasciata and Tetragonisca angustula, P. remota shows incredibly efficient hygienic behavior in response to dead broods. Within a 24-hour period, P. remota remove an average of 69.6% of the dead brood, and by 48 hours 96.4% of the dead brood is removed. This is more efficient than M. quadrifasciata and T. angustula, which in 72 hours only removed 1% and 30% of the dead brood, respectively. The P. remota bee's efficient hygienic behavior shows that they have a way to resist diseases.

=== Division of labor ===
In P. remota, the division of labor is based on the age of the worker. There are 7 different tasks that have been observed in the nest of P. remota and each of them occur at different times in the workers life. The first task that workers perform usually involves either using cerumen to build the bars between combs and walls or building and maintaining the storage pots and the connecting cerumen bar. This occurs a few days after emerging. The second task that workers do involves working on the old combs, helping the young bees to emerge, feeding them, and then gnawing off the remains of the cell. This happens when they are between the ages of 6 and 30 days. The third task is building the cells, which is limited to bees that are 12–24 days old. This is also the task where the fewest bees participate. The fourth task workers do is called dehydration, which simply describes the collection of nectar from the pots. This is done by workers that are older than 18 days or by the males. The fifth task is receiving nectar from foragers which is done by workers that are older than 24 days. The sixth task is foraging and it is normally done in the final stage of the workers' lives, which starts at day 30. The seventh task involves work around the royal chamber for the gynes, which include reconstruction and maintenance and are done by workers between the ages of 23 and 85 days. Task 1 is done by 94% of the workers, task 2 is done by 21% of the workers, task 3 is done by 12% of the bees, task 4 is done by 69%, task 5 is done by 60%, task 6 is done by 46% and task 7 is done by 27% of the workers.

=== Mating behavior ===
Unlike bees in the Apini tribe where the queen exhibits polyandry, queens in P. remota are monandrous. The males will crowd around the entrance to the colony since this will increase the male's chances of mating with the virgin queen. The male will attempt to mate with the queen as she tries to leave the nest. The male that mated with the queen will then leave a mating plug to deter further chances of mating.

=== Changes during reproductive diapause ===
In P. remota, the bees undergo reproductive diapause during the autumn and winter in Brazil, during which there is little to no brood production. During reproductive diapause many changes happen in the colony. One change is that construction of cells and the allocation of food for the cells stop. The foraging patterns of the bees change as well. During diapause foraging will normally occur in the middle of the day whereas during the reproductive phase foraging was relatively constant throughout the entire day. There are also changes that occur in workers during reproductive diapause. Not only do workers that are born right before or right after diapause have longer lives, but also the age at which they start foraging changes from 43 to 90 days during the reproductive phase, to 42 to 107 during diapause.

=== The provisioning and oviposition process ===
Stingless bees show mass provisioning of brood cells. In mass provisioning, once the egg is laid in the cell it is closed and not reopened until the young bee comes out of it. The provisioning which is started by signals sent by the queen, the oviposition of the queen and the workers capping off the cells only takes a few minutes. This process is called the Provisioning and Oviposition Process or POP. POP not only involves the synchronized actions of the workers but it also involves complex communication with the queen. Different species of stingless bees differ with the number of cells contained in on POP. In Plebeia, POP is characterized by synchronous construction of cells and having all of them provisioned and oviposited very quickly followed by the construction of new cells soon after. One thing to note in P. remota is that the queen does not inspect the cells before her oviposition into them. This suggests that the queen is receiving signals from the workers that it is ok to oviposit into them. Another thing to note is that the first discharge may not be enough to cause continuous discharge of eggs since P. remota is also known to be able disrupt a series of discharge. Worker may also lay eggs during this time, they are mostly likely to be trophic eggs which are either given to the queen as an offering or eaten by the other worker. We also see that during POP worker when constructing the cells will act indifferent to the queen, but when see starts to oviposit, the will actively resist the queen and protect the cell they just built which is a very unusual behavior. This suggests that queens not only have no influence on cell construction, but it also shows that it is completely up to the workers when they start construction of the cells.

== Kin selection ==
=== Genetic relatedness ===
In P. remota, the relatedness of the colony is typical of a bee species that only mates once. Queens are 50% related to workers, workers are 75% related to each other, and males laid by the queen are 100% related to the queen and 25% related to the workers; these ratios are typical for haplodiploidy. As such, there is queen-worker conflict over the sex ratio. Workers will attempt to lay their own eggs instead because the males born from their eggs will be more related to them than the unfertilized egg laid by the queen. In the end, the queen usually wins the conflict because the majority of the colony's males are her sons. This occurs mainly because when the queen approaches a worker, the worker will either move away, offer food, or lay a trophic egg that either the queen or another worker will eat.

== Life history ==
=== Workers ===
In one study that examined 37 brood combs from five colonies of P. remota, it was shown that 73.40% of the individuals were workers. Workers are produced throughout the entire year and perform many of the functions needed to grow and maintain the nest. Starting from a few days after their birth until their death, they continually support the hive, from building the nest at an early age, to foraging near the end of their lives.

=== Queens ===
A study showed that a typical nest would rear between 1–5 gynes during an observation period that varied between 6 and 18 months. However, it was also noted that on occasion P. remota may produce a high number of gynes, up to 46. Another thing to note is that gynes can be produced in the same cells that give rise to the worker class. The only difference between the queen and the workers is that queens are generally bigger, however this is not always the case since it has been documented that queens can be the same size as the workers. The same study also showed that there is no correlation between the queen's size and whether they are accepted or have a successful mating. Queens emerge always attractive, meaning that they cause changes in the intranidal behavior of the workers. Normally after gynes are produced, a majority of them are killed by the workers. The ones that survive can be kept alive in cerumen chambers protected by a barrier of wax called the royal camber. It is those survivors who will go on and form new colonies.

==== Miniature queens ====
It is not uncommon to find that the size of the queen can vary in stingless bees. Miniature queens have been observed in six species of stingless bees including P. remota, Cephalotrigona femorata, Plebeia juliani, Schwarziana quadripunctata, Plebeia emerina and Nannotrigona testaceicornis. In most of these species, the production of miniature queens is very rare. However, both large and miniature queens have been observed in some nests of P. remota. Studies, done by M.F. Ribeiro and colleagues, have explored whether miniature queens have any adaptive significance by comparing the percentage of virgin and mating queens that were miniature versus normal and their egg laying performance.

In this study they found that their sample virgin queens were mostly miniature, while mating queens were mostly normal. However, excluding the colonies with abnormal gyne production, there was an equal proportion of miniature mating and virgin queens. In queens the oviposition rate is determined by the number of ovarioles. When comparing the normal sized queens with the miniature queens, Ribeiro found a constant number of four ovarioles. Also when queens of different sizes were under the same conditions for oviposition, they were both equally active in laying eggs. All these results show that miniature queens can mate and head colonies just as well and just as likely as normal sized queens.

=== Males ===
In one study it was shown that in 37 broods from five colonies of P. remota, 26.52% of the individuals or 2966 bees were male. Of the 2966 males, only two of them were produced in royal cells. Not all the samples in the experiment had males in the combs. 18.92% of the samples had no males. Out of the samples that contained males, 16.22% of the combs had males make up over half the population of individuals. This study also showed that brood combs collected in June and October 2003 showed the lowest frequency of males. It was shown in this study that there was a lot of variation in male production and male frequency in combs.

In P. remota, as well as in other Melipona species, there are certain periods of time where there are more males produced. These periods are called male-producing periods. These periods are normally short and not synchronous with other colonies since each colony has their own schedule for when they reproduce. Also in P. remota most of the males born in the colony were produced only by the queen even though the workers are just as capable of producing males. It was also observed that in combs with lots of males, there was a lower percentage of workers indicating that when many males are produced, investment in workers decrease.

== Diet ==
The diet of P. remota normally consists of pollen and nectar. Depending on the time of year and various climatic factors, the amount of pollen and nectar collected can change. Similar to other species of stingless bees, P. remota only intensively uses a few floral resources to collect the pollen and nectar they need. They get their pollen from seven sources while they get their nectar from eight sources. These sources are manly from trees that are not that far from the colony, roughly about 100 meters. In a study conducted, P. remota was observed mainly foraging from Archontophoenix, Cecropia and multiple Eucalyptus species. Other species that were also foraged from but to a lesser extent were Piptadenia, Tipuana speciosa, Impatiens balsamina, Cabralea s.l., Mimosa daleoides, and Asparagus s.l. Within the family Apidae, P. remota occupies an intermediate position on the scale of polylecty that covers ten species.
