= Herbert Ferlando Schwarz =

American entomologist

- Born: 7 September 1883; Fire Island, New York, US
- Died: 2 October 1960 (aged 77)
- Scientific career
- Fields: entomology
- Institutions: American Museum of Natural History

Herbert Ferlando Schwarz (7 September 1883 – 2 October 1960) was an American entomologist who specialised in Hymenoptera. He was appointed a research associate at the American Museum of Natural History in 1921, a position he held until his death, and was the editor of Natural History magazine from 1921 to 1925.

Schwarz described numerous stingless bee (Meliponini) genera such as Plebeia and Partamona.

== Tributes ==
The bee genera Schwarziana and Schwarzula are named after him.
