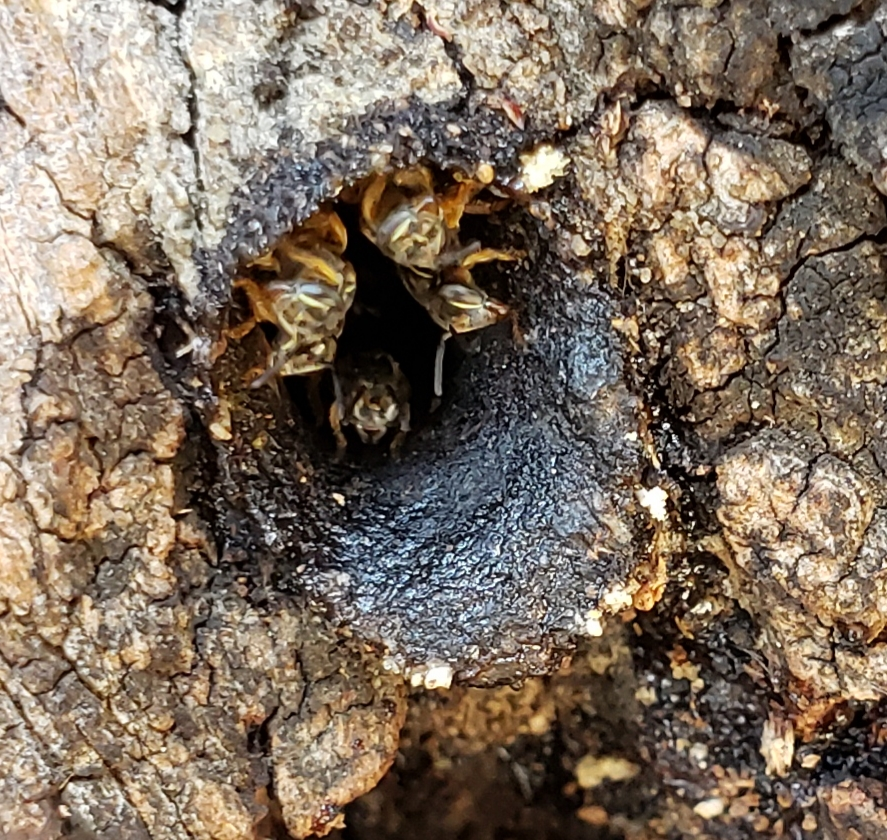

Scientific classification
- Kingdom: Animalia
- Phylum: Arthropoda
- Class: Insecta
- Order: Hymenoptera
- Family: Apidae
- Clade: Corbiculata
- Tribe: Meliponini
- Genus: Plebeia
- Species: P. droryana

Binomial name
- Plebeia droryana (Holmberg, 1903)
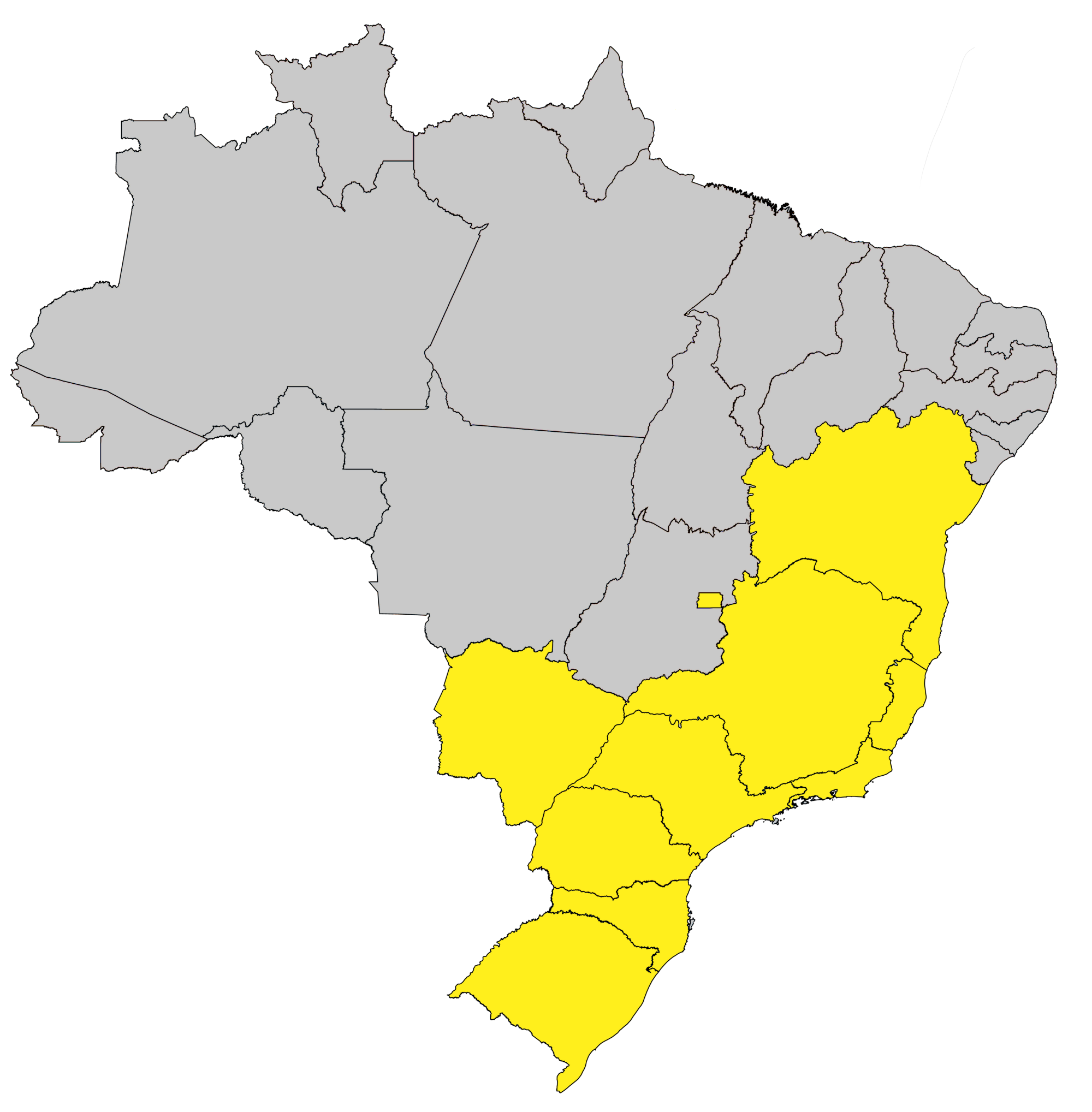
- Range of P. droryana in Brazil

= Plebeia droryana =

Species of bee

Plebeia droryana is a species of stingless bee that is in the family Apidae and tribe Meliponini. Bees of the species are normally found in a few states in southern Brazil and their nests can be found in tree cavities. Depending on the region, P. remota may have a different morphology and exhibit different behaviors. The bee's diet consists of nectar and pollen that are collected intensely from a few sources. Researchers have conducted a multitude of studies analyzing the changes that occur in the colony during reproductive diapause and what happens during the Provisioning and Oviposition Process or POP.
