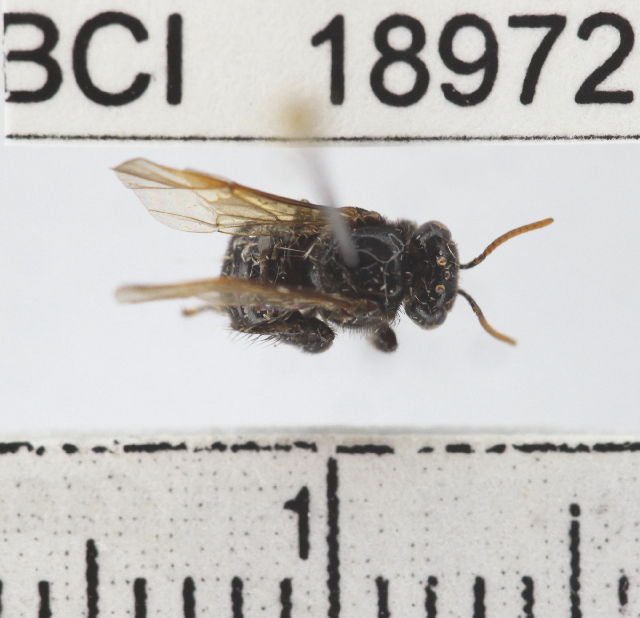

Scientific classification
- Domain: Eukaryota
- Kingdom: Animalia
- Phylum: Arthropoda
- Class: Insecta
- Order: Hymenoptera
- Family: Apidae
- Clade: Corbiculata
- Tribe: Meliponini
- Genus: Partamona
- Species: P. peckolti

Binomial name
- Partamona peckolti Friese, 1901
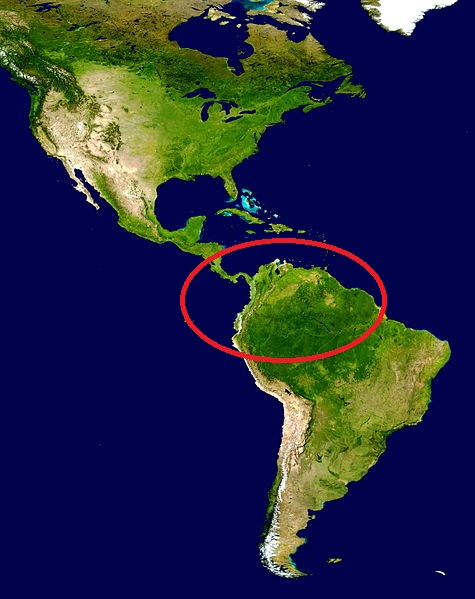
- Range of P. peckolti

= Partamona peckolti =

Species of bee

Partamona peckolti is a species of stingless bee from South America.
