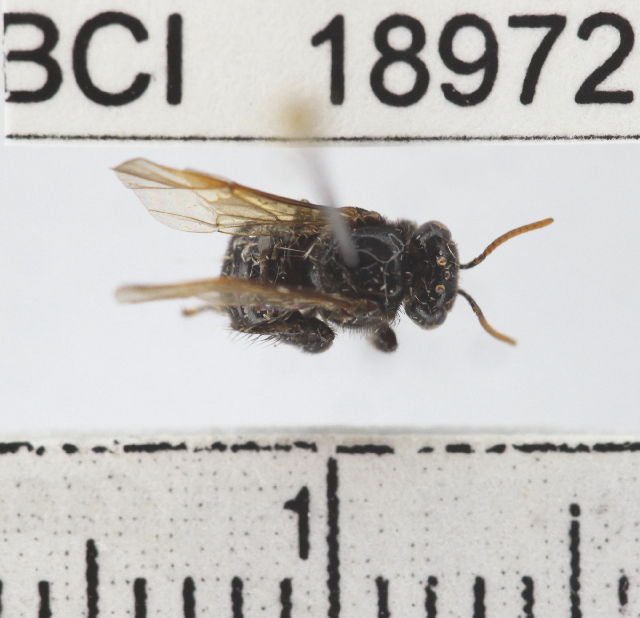
- Partamona peckolti

Scientific classification
- Kingdom: Animalia
- Phylum: Arthropoda
- Clade: Pancrustacea
- Class: Insecta
- Order: Hymenoptera
- Family: Apidae
- Tribe: Meliponini
- Genus: Partamona; Schwarz, 1938

Species
- See text.

= Partamona =

Genus of bees

Partamona is a genus of stingless bees in the family Apidae. Herbert Ferlando Schwarz in 1938 described the genus. The genus is found from Mexico to Brazil.

== Species ==
- Partamona aequatoriana Camargo, 1980
- Partamona ailyae Camargo, 1980
- Partamona auripennis Pedro & Camargo, 2003
- Partamona batesi Pedro & Camargo, 2003
- Partamona bilineata Say, 1837
- Partamona brevipilosa Schwarz, 1948
- Partamona chapadicola Pedro & Camargo, 2003
- Partamona combinata Pedro & Camargo, 2003
- Partamona criptica Pedro & Camargo, 2003
- Partamona cupira Smith, 1863
- Partamona epiphytophila Pedro & Camargo, 2003
- Partamona ferreirai Pedro & Camargo, 2003
- Partamona grandipennis Schwarz, 1951
- Partamona gregaria Pedro & Camargo, 2003
- Partamona helleri Friese, 1900
- Partamona littoralis Pedro & Camargo, 2003
- Partamona mourei Camargo, 1980
- Partamona mulata Moure, 1980
- Partamona musarum Cockerell, 1917
- Partamona nhambiquara Pedro & Camargo, 2003
- Partamona nigrior Cockerell, 1925
- Partamona orizabaensis Strand, 1919
- Partamona pearsoni Schwarz, 1938
- Partamona peckolti Friese, 1901
- Partamona rustica Pedro & Camargo, 2003
- Partamona seridoensis Pedro & Camargo, 2003
- Partamona sooretamae Pedro & Camargo, 2003
- Partamona subtilis Pedro & Camargo, 2003
- Partamona testacea Klug, 1807
- Partamona vicina Camargo, 1980
- Partamona vitae Pedro & Camargo, 2003
- Partamona xanthogastra Pedro & Camargo, 1997
- Partamona yungarum Pedro & Camargo, 2003
- Partamona zonata Smith, 1854
