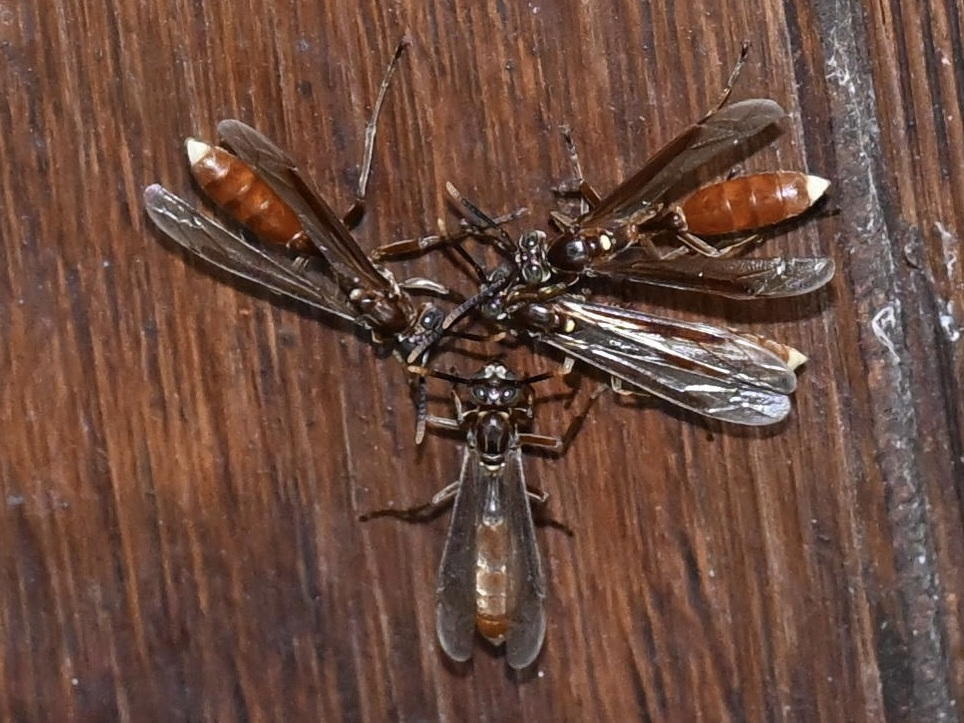
- Apoica pallida in Trinidad and Tobago

Scientific classification
- Kingdom: Animalia
- Phylum: Arthropoda
- Class: Insecta
- Order: Hymenoptera
- Family: Vespidae
- Genus: Apoica
- Species: A. pallida

Binomial name
- Apoica pallida (Olivier, 1791)

= Apoica pallida =

Species of wasp

Apoica pallida, known as the marimbondo-chapéu in Brazil, is a nocturnal eusocial wasp in the subfamily Polistinae.
