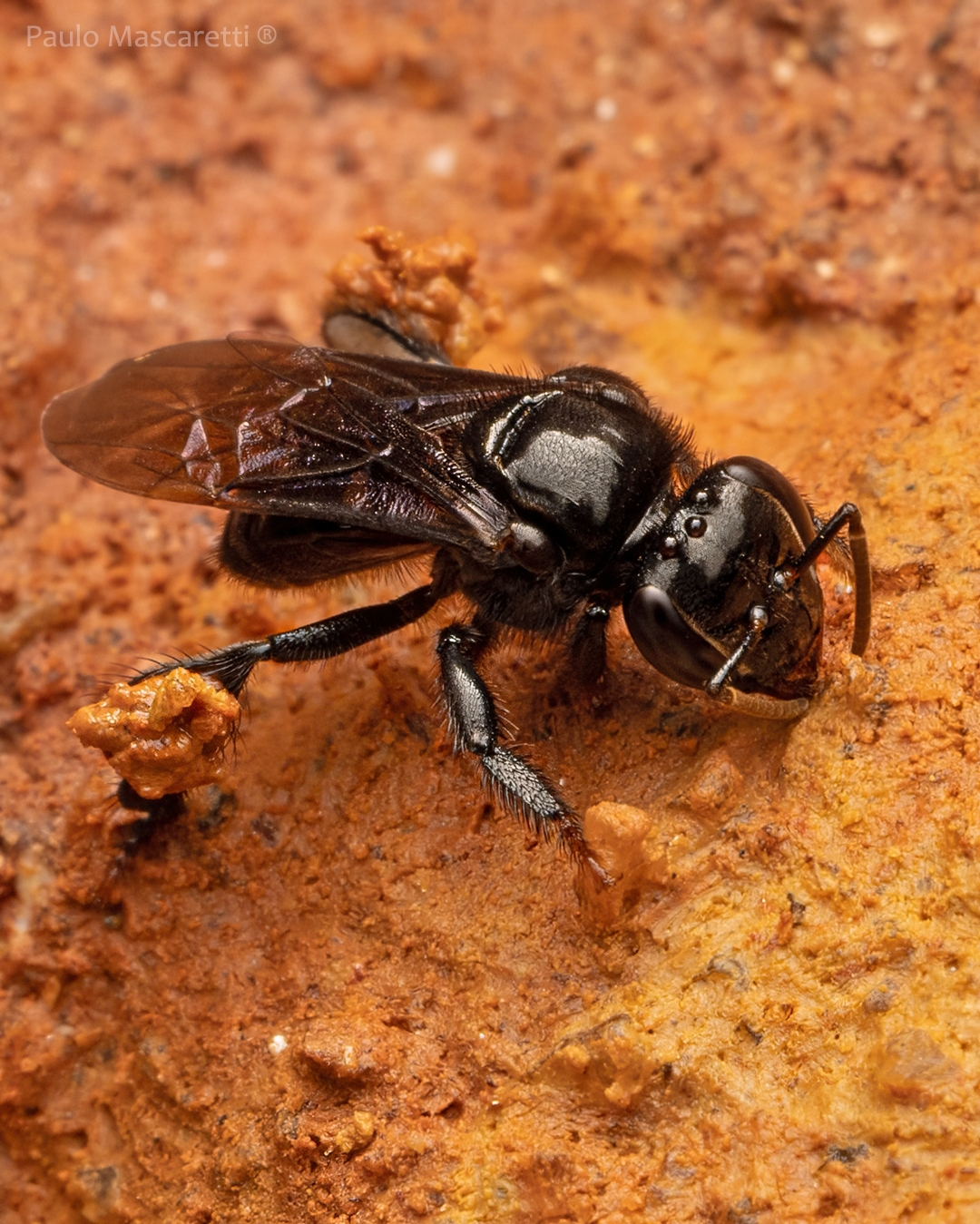

Scientific classification
- Kingdom: Animalia
- Phylum: Arthropoda
- Class: Insecta
- Order: Hymenoptera
- Family: Apidae
- Genus: Partamona
- Species: P. helleri

Binomial name
- Partamona helleri Friese, 1900
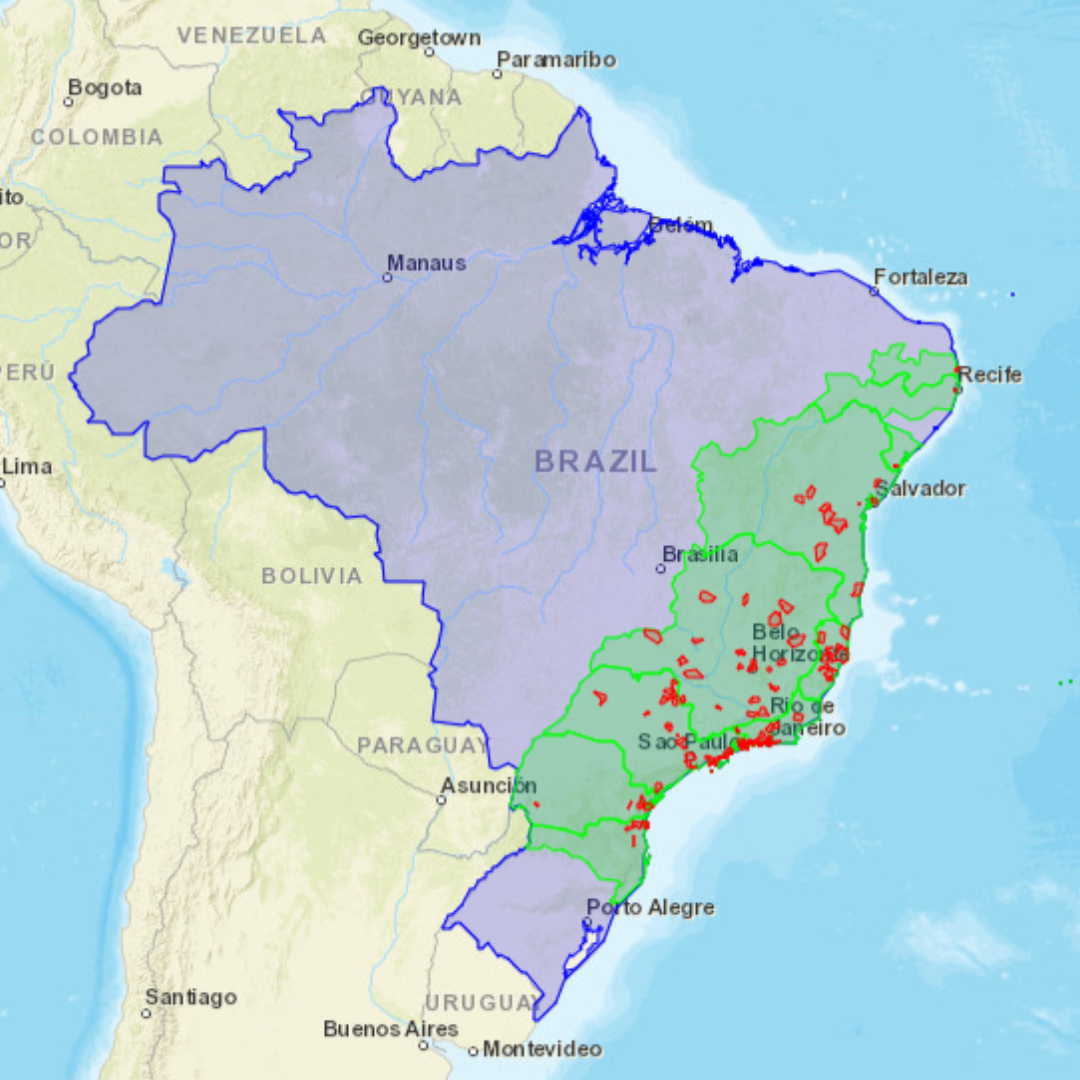
- Range of P. helleri

= Partamona helleri =

Species of bee

Partamona helleri, the Heller's stingless bee, is a species of stingless bee from Brazil. It is an aggressive species of bee, when threatened it coils around the victim's hair and fur, in addition to nibbling the skin with its mandibles.

== Distribution ==
It occurs in the neotropical region of Brazil, from the south region to the northeast region in the states of Bahia, Espírito Santo, Minas Gerais, Paraná, Paraíba, Pernambuco, Rio de Janeiro, Santa Catarina, Sergipe and São Paulo.

== Behavior ==
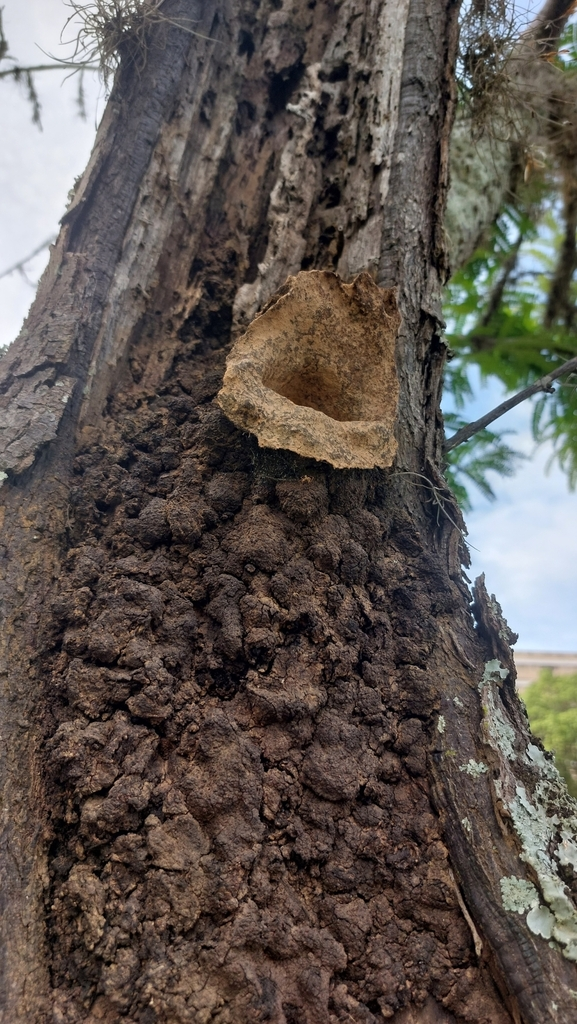
Nest of P. helleri

=== Nests ===
Partamona helleri constructs the entrance to its nest in the shape of a large frog's mouth, made of clay with propolis, because of this it is also known as the "toad's mouth bee". The wide outer entrance of the funnel-shaped nest is correlated with the defense of the colony, because it facilitates forager traffic while the narrow inner entrance requires only a few guards to defend.

The construction process involves the use of wax, pure or mixed plant resins, and, in some cases, soil mixed with resins. The entrance structures are distinct and elaborate, varying among Partamona species. The chosen substrate and nest architecture are adapted to provide protection against predators and ensure necessary support. In the case of P. helleri they nest under epiphytic roots, holes in walls, eaves, and ridges of houses, under air conditioning units, abandoned bird nests, freely on tree branches, basically on any substrate providing some protection. Also found in active termite mounds.

Crash-landing

Partamona helleri displays a distinctive behavior known as "crash-landing" during its nest entry. Unlike the typical gradual deceleration and controlled landing observed in other flying insects, returning P. helleri workers accelerate as they approach the nest entrance. They collide headfirst with the outer entrance funnel wall, then rebound downward toward the inner entrance. This behavior is a unique defense mechanism thought to deter ambush predators at the nest entrance. Remarkably, despite the high speed and impact of the crash-landing, the bees remain unharmed due to their small size.
