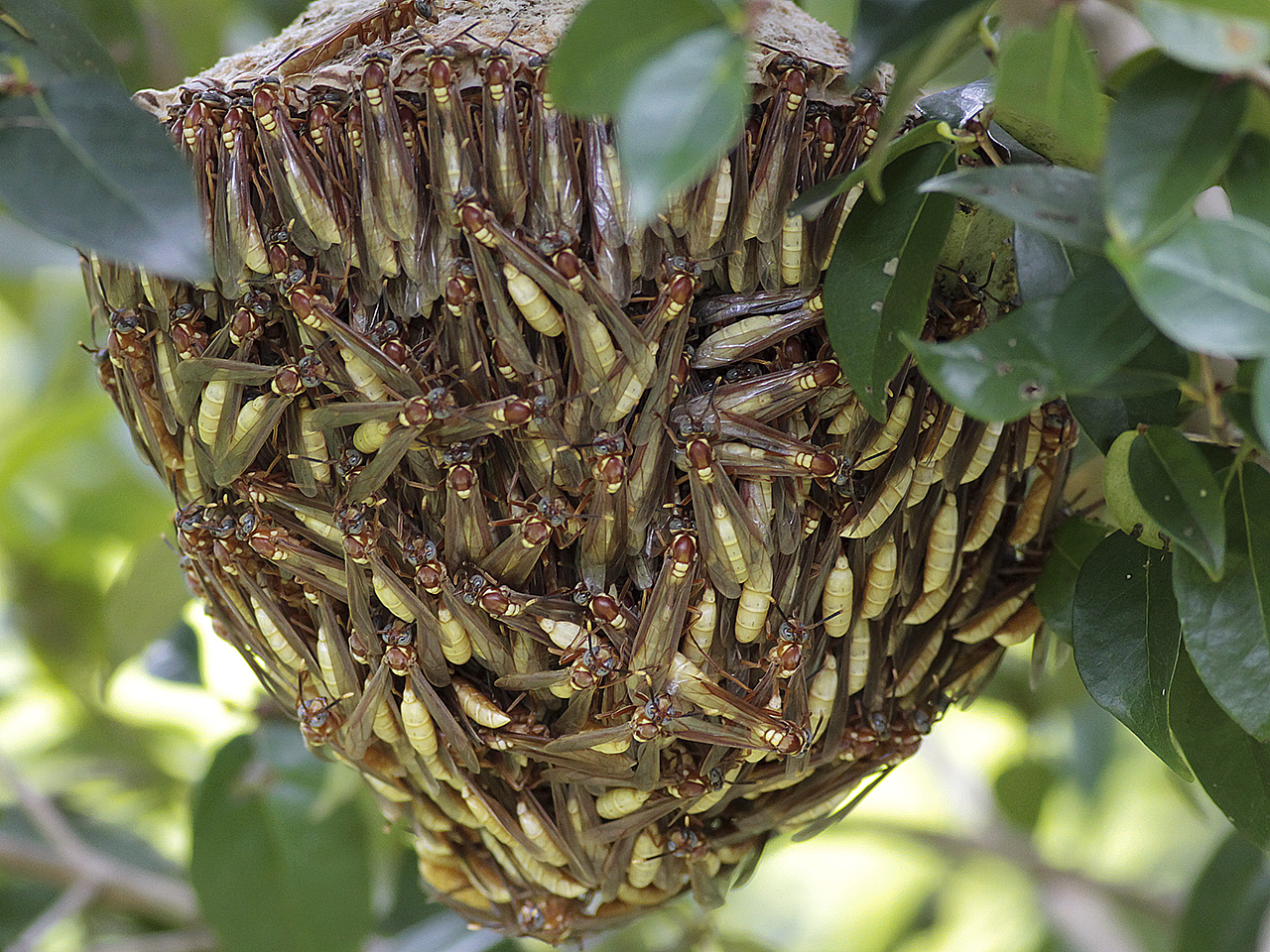
- Nest of Apoica gelida

Scientific classification
- Kingdom: Animalia
- Phylum: Arthropoda
- Clade: Pancrustacea
- Class: Insecta
- Order: Hymenoptera
- Family: Vespidae
- Tribe: Epiponini
- Genus: Apoica; Lepeletier, 1836

Type species
- Apoica pallida Olivier, 1791

Species
- 10 described species, see text

= Apoica =

Genus of wasps

Apoica is a genus of eusocial paper wasp found throughout the Central and South American tropics. These wasps are truly nocturnal, carrying out their foraging activities after the setting of the sun. They prefer to construct their nests, which have an open comb like many paper wasps, under large leaves, or in shrubs. During the day, wasps covering the comb fan their wings to cool the nest, keeping it at a suitable temperature for larval development.

When attacking prey, Apoica release a drop of venom from their stings, which in turn attracts any nearby wasps to attack.

== Species ==
There are 10 species of Apoica:

=== Subgenus Apoica (Apoica) Lepeletier, 1836 ===
- Apoica albimacula (Fabricius, 1804)
- Apoica ambracarina Pickett, 2003
- Apoica ellenae Pickett, 2007
- Apoica flavissima van der Vecht, 1972
- Apoica gelida van der Vecht, 1972
- Apoica pallens (Fabricius, 1804)
- Apoica pallida (Olivier, 1791)
- Apoica strigata Richards, 1978
- Apoica thoracica du Buysson, 1906

=== Subgenus Apoica (Deuterapoica) Dalla Torre, 1904 ===
- Apoica arborea de Saussure, 1854

== Gallery ==
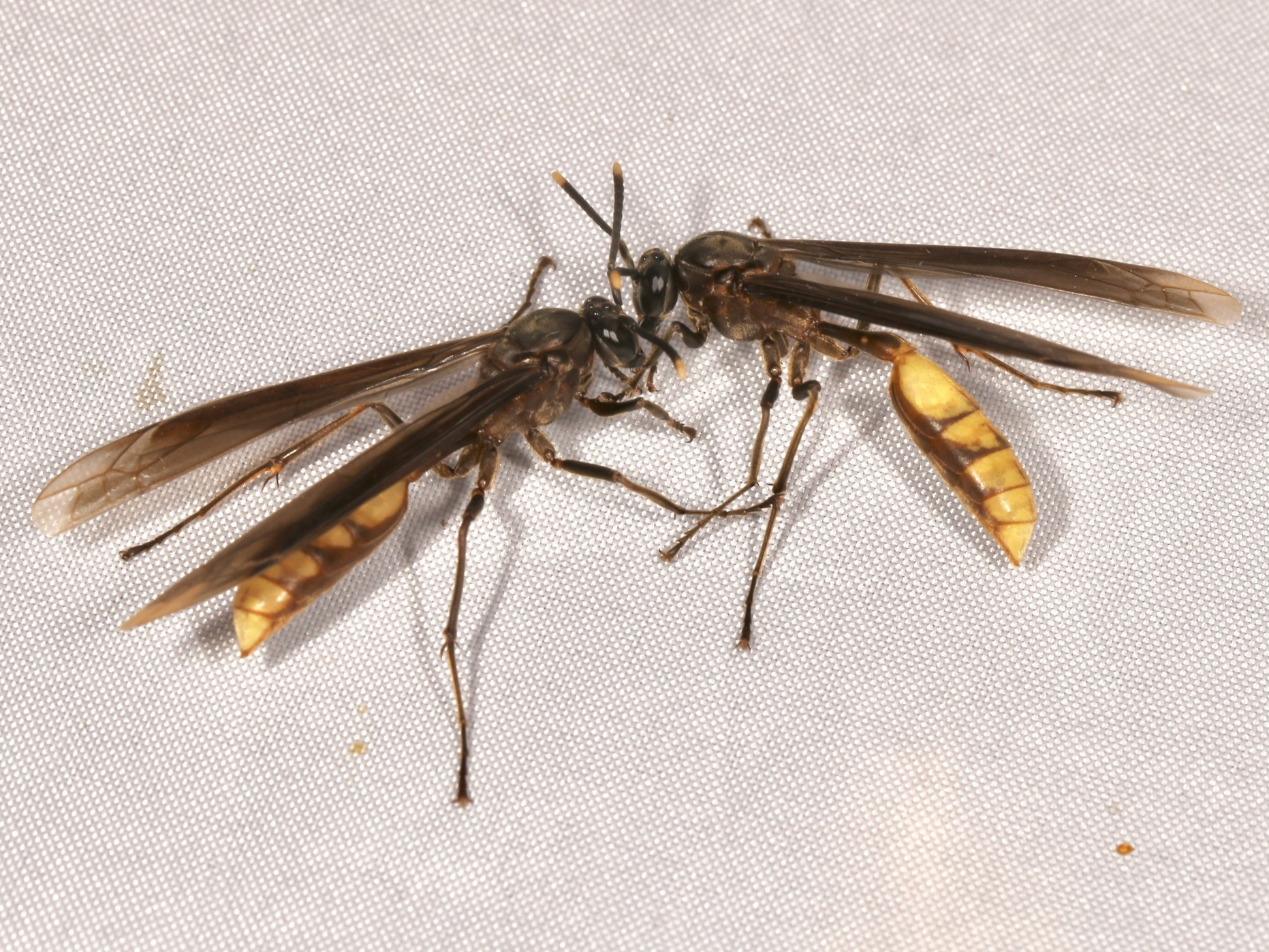
Apoica (Apoica) ambracarina in Peru

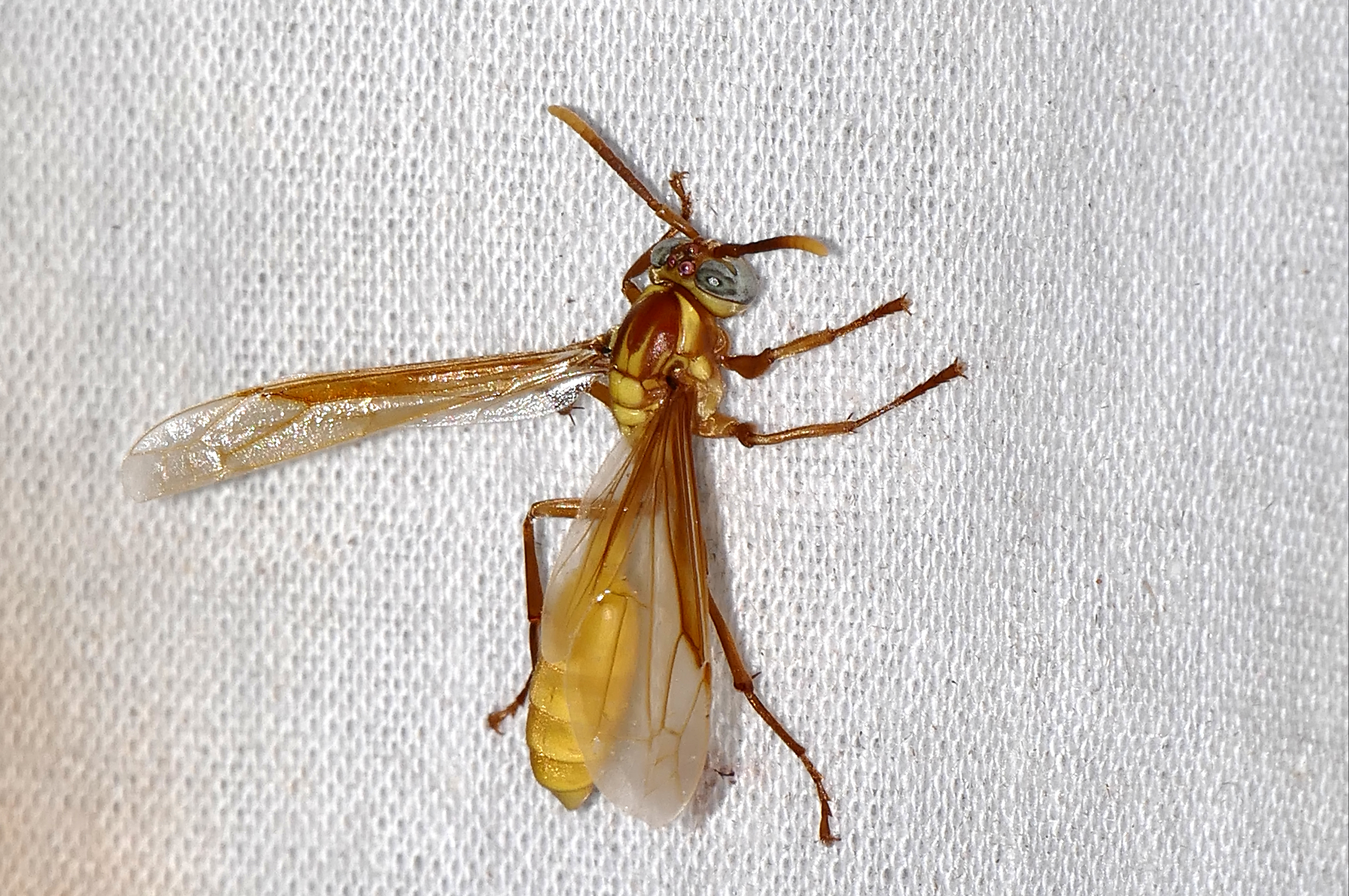
Apoica (Apoica) flavissima in French Guyana

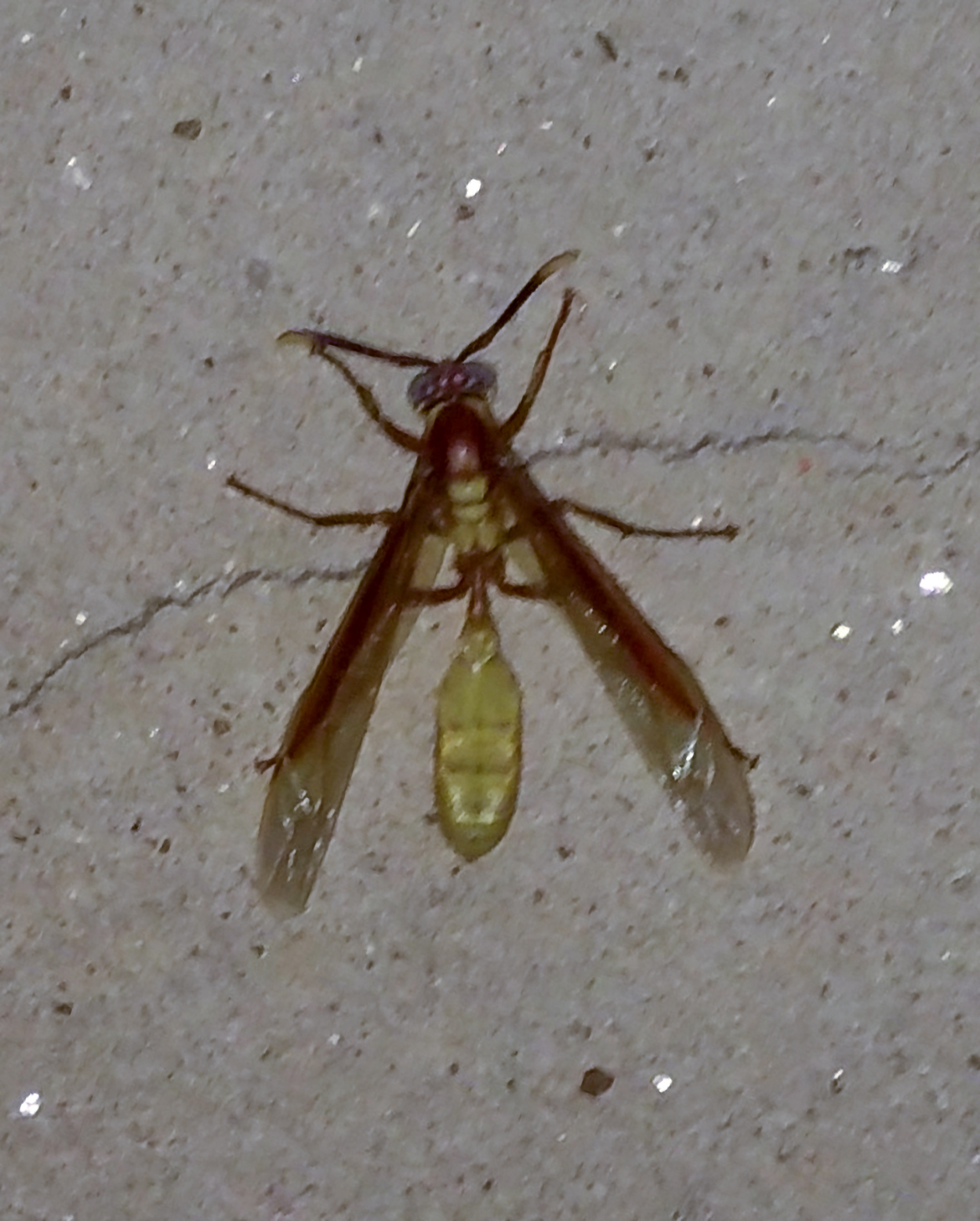
Apoica (Apoica) gelida in Brazil

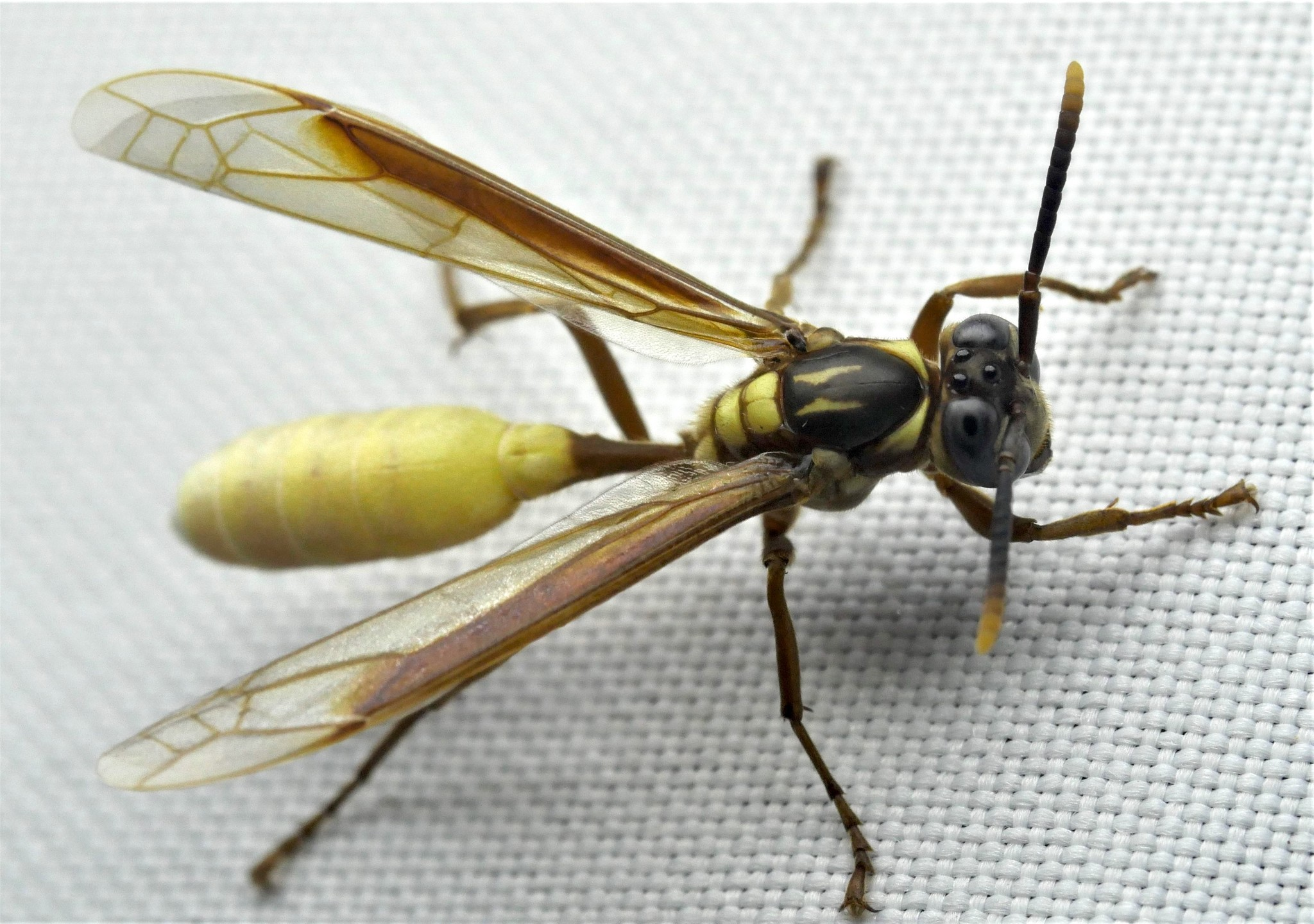
Apoica (Apoica) pallens in Panama

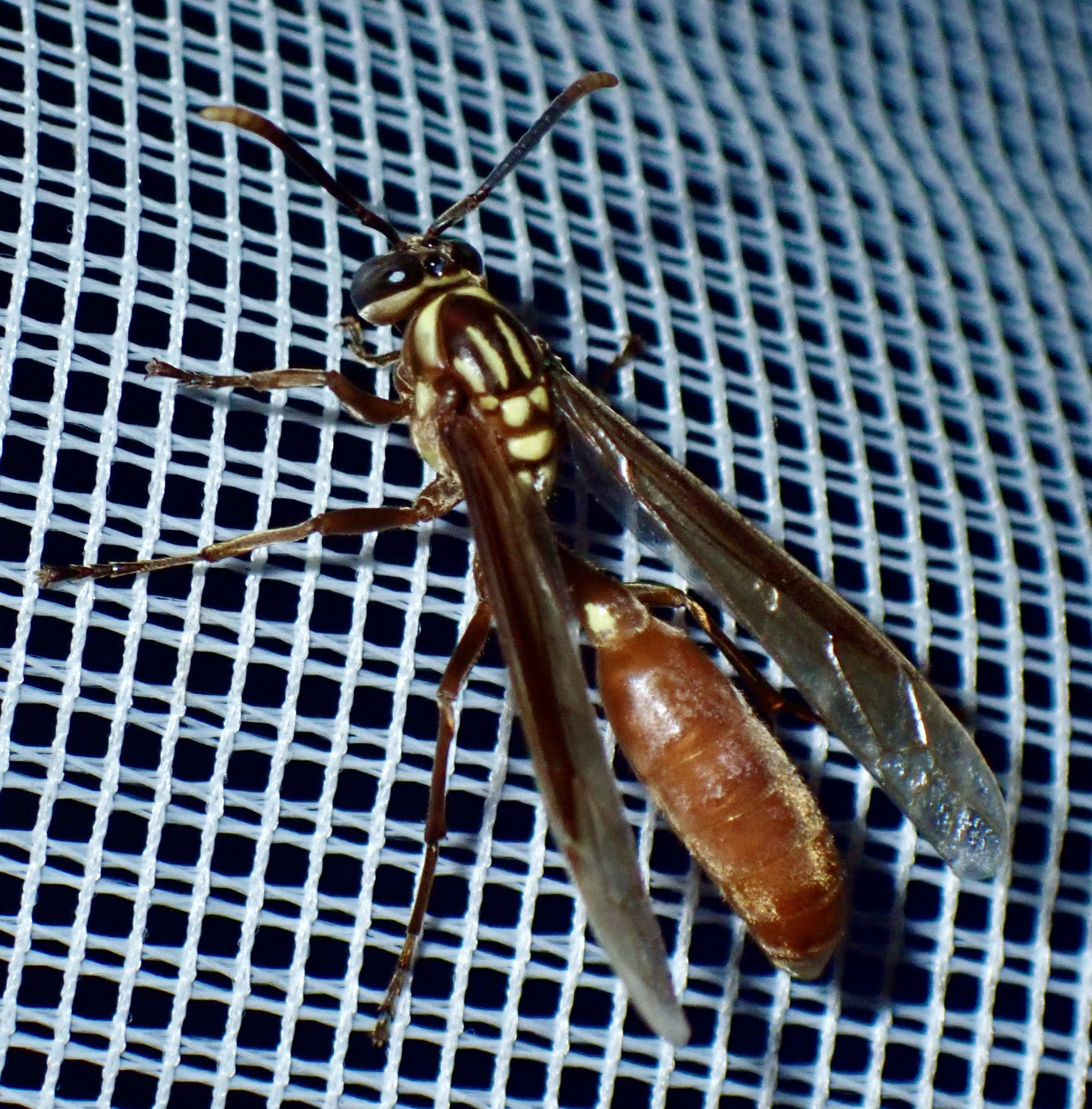
Apoica (Apoica) pallida in Suriname

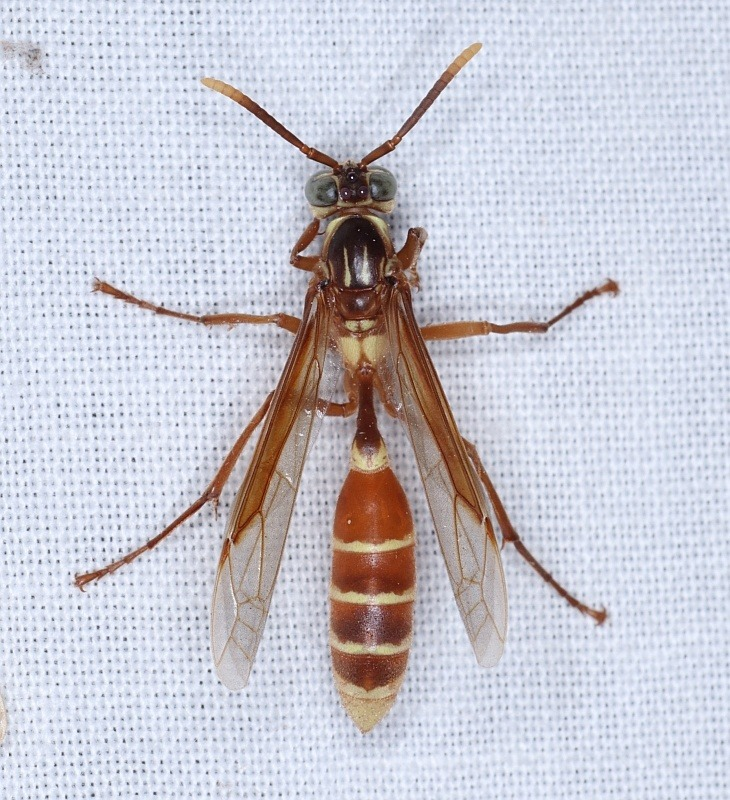
Apoica (Apoica) strigata in Peru

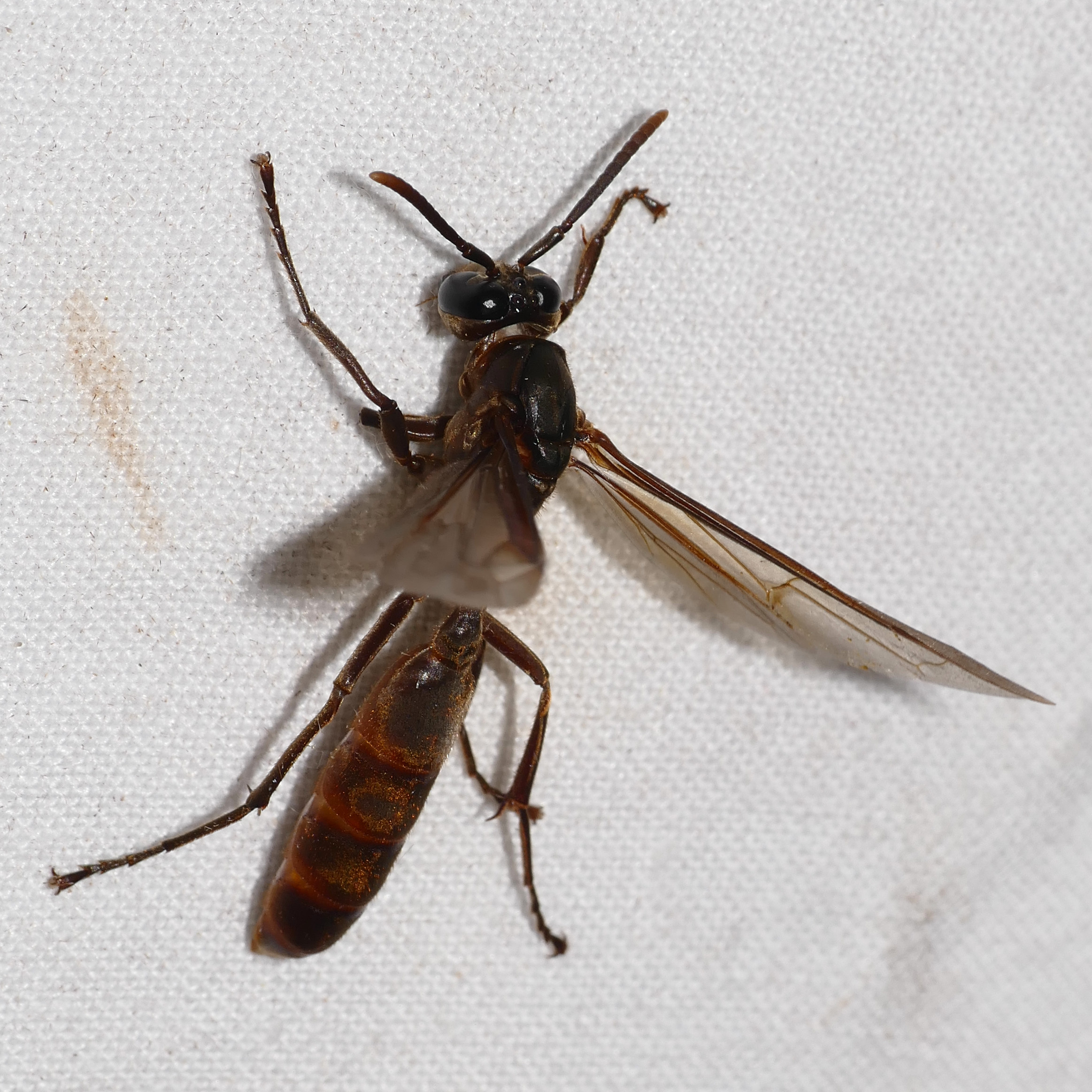
Apoica (Apoica) thoarcica in French Guyana

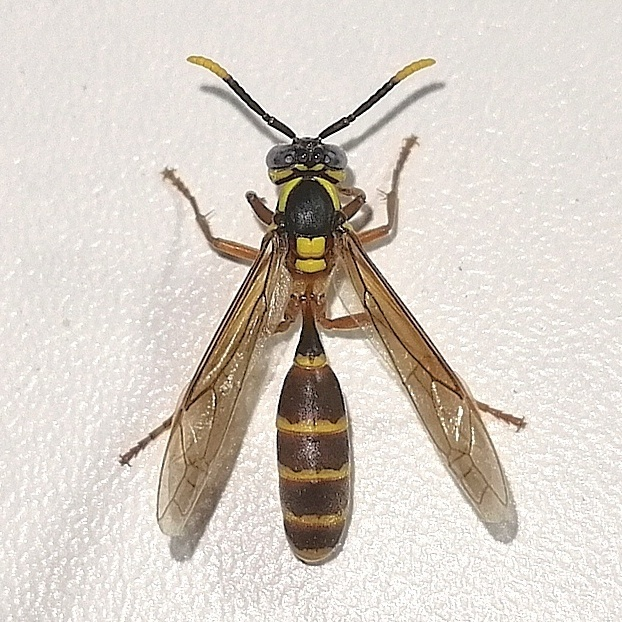
Apoica (Deuterapoica) arborea in Ecuador
