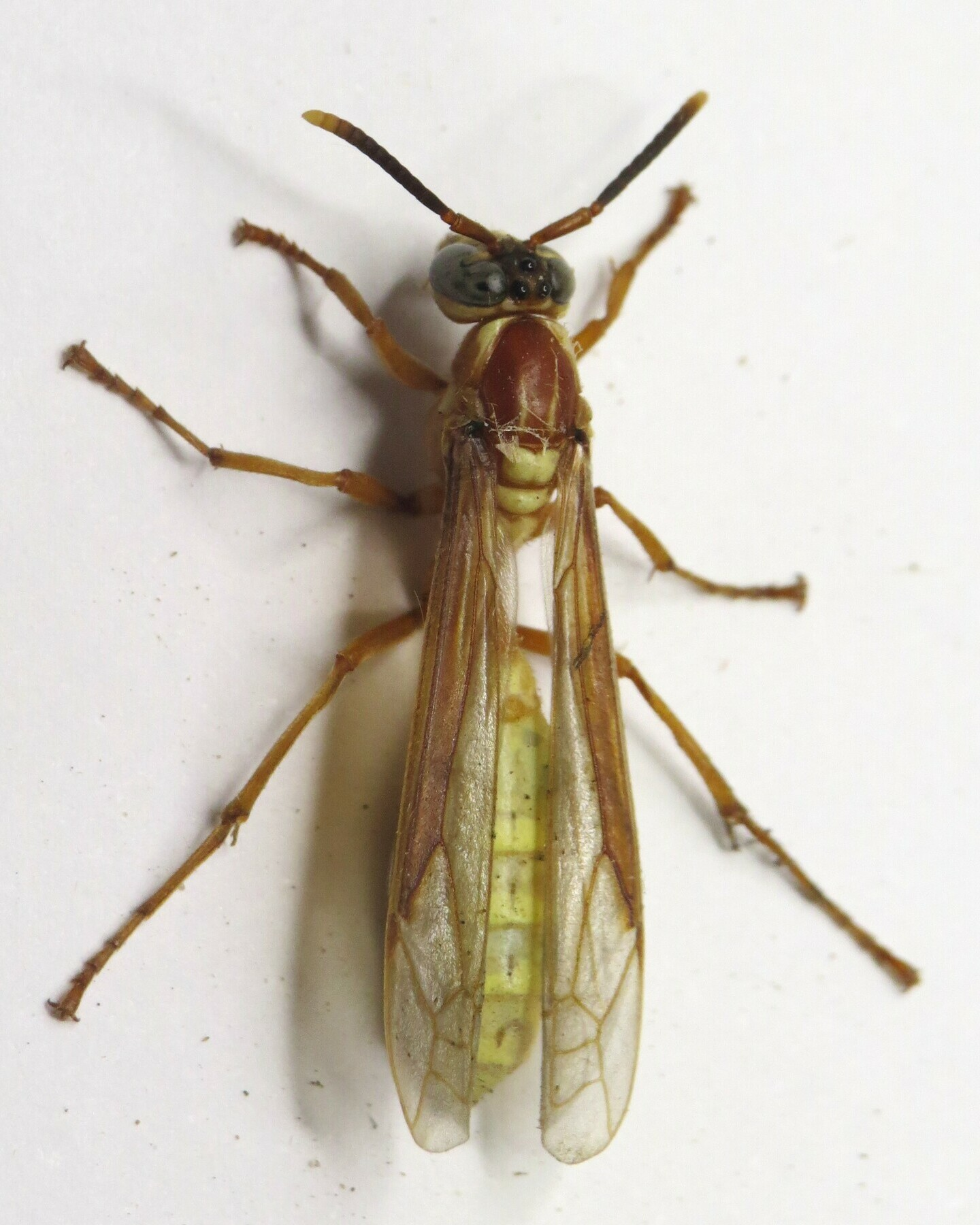

Scientific classification
- Kingdom: Animalia
- Phylum: Arthropoda
- Clade: Pancrustacea
- Class: Insecta
- Order: Hymenoptera
- Family: Vespidae
- Subfamily: Polistinae
- Tribe: Epiponini
- Genus: Apoica
- Species: A. flavissima

Binomial name
- Apoica flavissima (Vecht, 1972)

= Apoica flavissima =

Species of wasp

Apoica flavissima is a paper wasp found primarily in South America. The species is distinguishable by its light coloring, unique single comb nests, and nocturnal nature. A notable feature of this species is the size dimorphism between queens and workers. Unlike most Vespidae wasps, Apocia flavissima queens are smaller than their worker counterparts which results in unique intraspecies relationships.

== Taxonomy and phylogeny ==
Originally, Apoica flavissima was thought to be a variety of Apoica pallens because of similar color and physical characteristics. It was not until 1972 that J. Van Der Vecht identified that three distinct species were mistakenly being categorized as one. Today, A. pallens, A. flavissima, and A. gelida are identified by differences in male genitalia. In addition, distinction can be made through slight color differences. While A. flavissima are entirely pale yellow, A. pallens are mostly yellow but have brown legs. Phylogenetic analysis indicates that Apoica flavissima is most closely related to Apoica pallens.

== Description ==
A. flavissima typically have a mesoscutum (the middle thoracic segment of the insect) that is dark yellow with outstanding bristles. The gaster (the enlarged posterior of the abdomen) is pale yellow along with the humeral plate. The posterior ocelli of the species are widely separated from the eyes. In addition, the wing length is typically 15.5–19 millimetres (0.61–0.75 in). Colonies of A. flavissima can be identified morphologically by having smaller queens than workers.

Unlike most wasp species, A flavissima exhibit a morphological caste difference in which the queen is smaller than workers in overall size and in other notable measurements. Specifically, workers have larger alitrunk length and number of hamuli. In addition to being smaller, the queens also exhibit color differences from the workers. Queens typically have a darker brown frons, clypeus, and mandible, while workers exhibit a light yellow coloring. Workers typically have a dark brown coloring of the basal half of the first gastral tergite while queens are typically light yellow. The most striking morphological difference between queens and workers relates to the lateral tip of the pronotum. Queens exhibit a tip that is gradually rounded while workers have a more acutely curved tip.

Nests are also a defining feature as they only have one comb. Young nests tend to appear hexagonal and grow by curving downward and becoming increasingly rounded and oval. The texture of the nests are described as felt-like.

== Distribution and habitat ==
Apoica flavissma are located in South America. The species can be primarily found in Panama, Guyana, Suriname, French Guiana, Brazil, Paraguay, and Argentina. This species is found in the Neotropical region, which has some of the greatest biodiversity on earth. Nests are typically found in wooded areas that can provide shade to help with the thermoregulation of the nest.

Due to the nocturnal nature of Apoica flavissima, the overall abundance of the species is unknown. It is assumed that the species is relatively common.

== Colony cycle ==
Colonies of Apoica flavissima are produced by the colony emigration of a swarm of at least one queen and multiple workers. A. flavissima differ from many other wasp species during this emigration because some males swarm along with females during this flight. Once a colony is founded, the cycle of an Apoica flavissima colony can be broken into three phases. The first phase is the pre-emergence phase. In this phase, no adult offspring have been produced, only eggs and young larvae. In the second stage, female workers are produced. The third stage is characterized by the production of males and queens. Apoica flavissima exhibits pre-imaginal determination of caste, meaning that an individual's caste is determined in the larval stage.

== Behavior ==
=== Nocturnal nature ===
Observations of A. flavissima indicate that adult wasps are dormant without any visible movement during the daytime. The only exception is when the colony is disturbed and swarms in a communal defense of the nest. While in this dormant state, the individuals in the colony rest on the under surface of the comb.

At nightfall, A. flavissima begin to abruptly depart the nest in an explosive swarm. Frequencies of departure appear to be affected by environmental factors such as cloudiness or rain. In addition, the foraging activities of A. flavissima correspond with phases of the moon as frequency of foraging significantly increases during the full and last quarter moon. This indicates that the presence of light is an important determinant of the nocturnal activities of the species.

=== Thermoregulation of nests ===
Since A. flavissma are observed to be dormant during the day, the species appears to have developed a behavior to regulate the temperature of the nest. This is done by coating the roof of the nest with oral secretions and attaching plant fibers to the roof of the nest. The central part of the roof is made to be particularly thick, to help with the insulation of the structure. This technique is successful at maintaining a mean temperature of 27.3 °C in the nest. During the day when temperature fluctuations are greater, the generation of metabolic heat from individuals in the nest appears to be key to the temperature stabilization of the nest.

== Kin selection ==
=== Pre-determination of caste ===
While some species of wasp select their queen on the basis of size, the selection of A. flavissima queens is physically pre-determined. Workers have under developed ovaries and are incapable of producing offspring throughout their entire lifestyle. Queens are the only females with developed ovaries and have long ovarioles with two or three mature oocytes. In contrast, worker A. flavissima exhibit underdeveloped ovaries with no visible oocytes. This physical morphological caste difference means that the ability of an individual to reproduce does not change in respect to environmental constraints or in respect to the life stage of the nest. This means there are no intermediates between queens and workers, creating a strict social hierarchy within the nest.

=== Genetic relatedness within colonies ===
Colonies of A. flavissima can rotate between polygyny (multiple queens) and monogyny (one queen). Due to this, the relatedness of workers to the queen or queens varies through time. Large nests typically have more queens, so relatedness between individuals could correlate with the size of the nest. Since it is often believed that workers rear the young of the queen altruistically due to relatedness of females, this fluctuation may lead to conflicts between castes in large nests. Due to this, in cases where the nest has multiple queens, these queens have little control over their reproductive outputs. Accordingly, as few as 1.5% of queens may be functional within a nest.

=== Worker-queen conflict ===
In Apoica flavissima nests, workers appear to have behavioral control. This may be caused by the low relatedness between females or the distinct morphological caste differences. Workers have been observed to behaviorally police the queen's reproductive output by biting and harassment. In large nests with multiple queens, workers have even been known to remove queens from the nest. These conflicts indicate that the workers play a part in the reproductive output of the nest.

== Interaction with other species ==
=== Diet ===
Apoica flavissima is observed to survive primarily on nectar brought back to the nest to feed young and queens during night foraging. Most of the materials brought back to the nest are given to a small collection of nest-mates who are tasked with distributing the food to feed both larvae and other adults. Recent studies have indicated that Apoica flavissima may also exhibit necrophagy, or the consumption of flesh, on larger vertebrates and invertebrate carcasses. Evidence of this behavior is a structural modification of the mandible of the species. A. flavissima has a dorsal tooth modification of the inner surface of its mandibles where the tooth is elongated and blade-like, making it potentially possible for the species to consume the flesh of bigger organisms.

=== Parasitism ===
A. flavissima are occasionally subjected to parasitism by other wasp species. Wasps in the family Trigonalidae are known for their parasitic nature, relying on hosts to ingest their eggs or provide homes for their young. A. flavissima appear to be subject to the latter, acting as a secondary host to trigonalid species who invade the nest and grow their young. Recent research indicates that some species of trigonalids may use A. flavissima as a primary host, using the species to inject their larvae and transfer it to the nest via trophallaxis.
