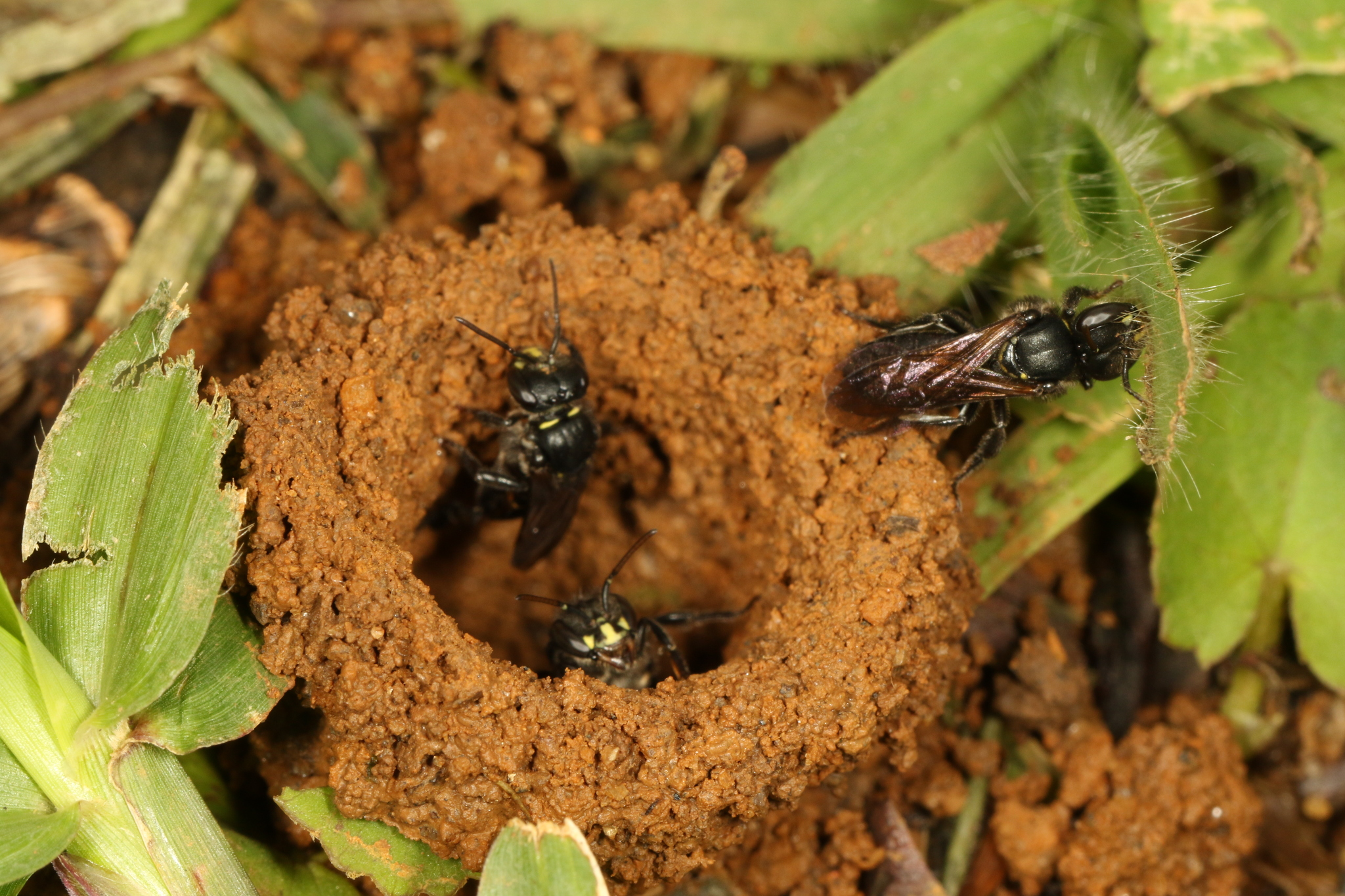

Scientific classification
- Kingdom: Animalia
- Phylum: Arthropoda
- Class: Insecta
- Order: Hymenoptera
- Family: Apidae
- Clade: Corbiculata
- Tribe: Meliponini
- Genus: Schwarziana; Moure, 1943

Species
- Schwarziana bocainensis Schwarziana chapadensis Schwarziana mourei Schwarziana quadripunctata

= Schwarziana =

Genus of bees

Schwarziana is a relatively small genus of South American stingless bees. Like other stingless bees, Schwarziana are eusocial, with large colonies primarily composed of workers and one queen. Unusually for stingless bees, colonies are formed in underground chambers rather than in tree cavities. Workers are approximately 6.5mm long

== Taxonomy ==
The type species for this genus, S. quadripunctata, was first described by the French entomologist Amédéé Louis Michel le Peletier in 1836. Although originally placed in the genus Trigona, more recent taxonomic evaluations have since placed it under its current genus, following the 1943 description of Schwarziana by Padre J.S. Moure. However, some still categorize Schwarziana as a subgenus under the closely related genus Plebeia. Recent morphological studies support Schwarziana as a genus, while Plebeia appears to be paraphyletic.
