= Gyne =

Primary reproductive female castes of insects, also known as queens

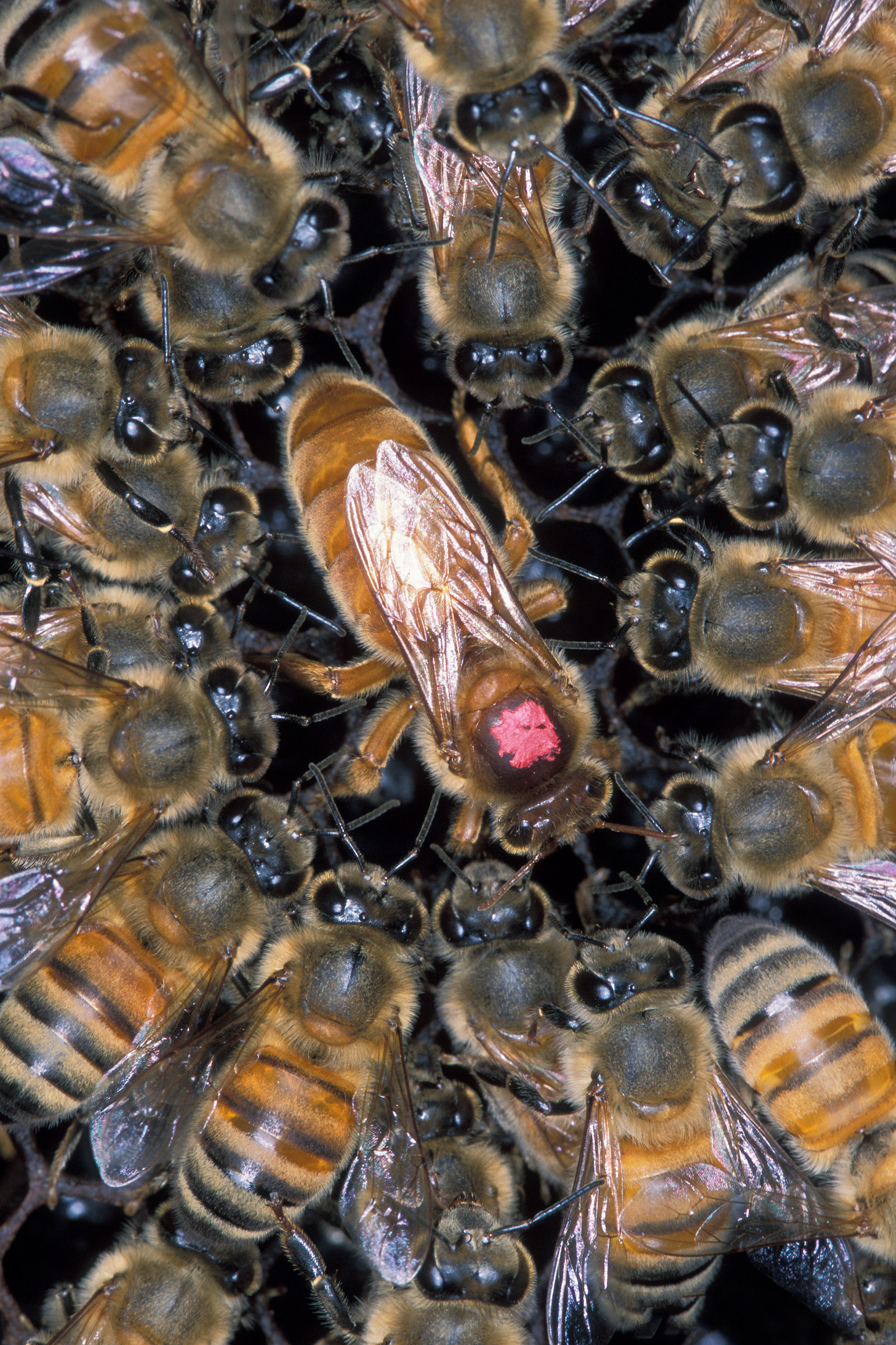
Queen (marked) and workers of the Africanised honey bee, Apis mellifera scutellata

The gyne (/ˈɡaɪn/, from Greek γυνή, "woman") is the primary reproductive female caste of social insects (especially ants, wasps, and bees of order Hymenoptera, as well as termites). Gynes are those destined to become queens, whereas female workers are typically barren and cannot become queens. Having a queen is what makes a "queenright" hive, nest, or colony of eusocial insects. A colony with multiple queens is said to be a polygyne form, whereas one with only one is a monogyne form.

The ancient Greek origin of gyne meant a woman who had given birth to at least one child.

In species lacking morphological castes (i.e., where "workers" may not be sterile), the term "gyne" is usually reserved for those females whose entire life is spent as a reproductive or potential reproductive, as opposed to those who start life as a worker and subsequently attain reproductive status (often called a "replacement queen" or a "laying worker"). These can be seen in certain species of stingless bee like the Plebeia remota where both gynes and workers are capable of reproducing. In most species with annual colony cycles, only gynes can enter diapause and overwinter, while workers – both non-reproductive and reproductive – die off. In some groups, such as paper wasps, gynes join with other gynes at the time of nest founding, and may be relegated to subordinate reproductive roles, so being a gyne does not guarantee that a female will become a queen.

== Examples ==
The red imported fire ant is known to have colonies in both polygyne and monogyne forms.

The small red ant, Leptothorax acervorum, has colonies that switch from monogyny to polygyny as a result of seasonal fluctuations.

The little fire ant Wasmannia auropunctata produces unique kinds of meiotic oocytes with a drastic reduction in recombination. These oocytes may either fuse together for gyne production (automictic parthenogenesis with central fusion) or be fertilized by male gametes for the production of workers.

In the wasp species Apoica flavissima queens display distinct morphological differences from the sterile worker class. In Ropalidia plebeiana, gynes do not stay in the nest after they emerge as adults, but may spend their winters in their maternal nests.

== See also ==
- Eusociality
- Queen ant
- Queen bee
