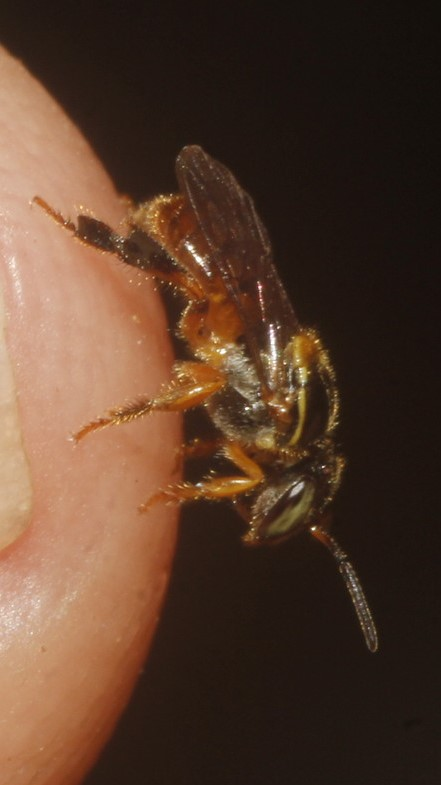
- Plebeia pulchra

Scientific classification
- Domain: Eukaryota
- Kingdom: Animalia
- Phylum: Arthropoda
- Class: Insecta
- Order: Hymenoptera
- Family: Apidae
- Tribe: Meliponini
- Genus: Plebeia; Schwarz, 1938

Species
- ~45 species; see text

= Plebeia =

Genus of bees

Plebeia is a genus of mostly small-bodied stingless bees, formerly included in the genus Trigona. Most of the ~45 species are placed in the subgenus (Plebeia) (s.s.), but there also are four species in the subgenus (Scaura). They differ in only minor structural details, primarily of the hind leg, from other genera that were formerly treated as constituents of Trigona. In some classifications, the genus Schwarziana is treated as a subgenus within Plebeia, but recent morphological analyses indicate that Schwarziana is a distinct lineage, while Plebeia is paraphyletic.

Due to their small sizes, in Brazil many species are known as abelha-mirim (literally "small bee") in Portuguese.

== Range ==
Species of the genus Plebeia occur from Mexico to Argentina.

A few feral colonies of P. emerina exist in the United States, the result of experimental imports in the 1950s.

== List of species ==
- P. alvarengai Moure, 1995
- P. amydra Engel, 2022
- P. asthenes Engel, 2021
- P. aurantia (Engel, 2022) [Now placed in genus Plectoplebeia]
- P. catamarcensis (Holmberg, 1903)
- P. chondra Engel, 2021
- P. cora Ayala, 1999
- P. deceptrix Engel, 2022
- P. domiciliorum (Schwarz, 1934)
- P. droryana (Friese, 1900)
- P. emerina (Friese, 1900)
- P. emerinoides (Silvestri, 1902)
- P. flavocincta (Cockerell, 1912)
- P. franki (Friese, 1900)
- P. frontalis (Friese, 1911)
- P. fulvopilosa Ayala, 1999
- P. goeldiana (Friese, 1900)
- P. grapiuna Melo & Costa, 2009
- P. guazurary Alvarez, Rasmussen, & Abrahamovich, 2016
- P. hyperplastica Engel, 2022
- P. jatiformis (Cockerell, 1912)
- P. julianii Moure, 1962
- P. kerri Moure, 1950
- P. llorentei Ayala, 1999
- P. lucii Moure, 2004
- P. malaris Moure, 1962
- P. manantlensis Ayala, 1999
- P. margaritae Moure, 1962
- P. melanica Ayala, 1999
- P. meridionalis (Ducke, 1916)
- P. mexica Ayala, 1999
- P. minima (Gribodo, 1893)
- P. molesta (Puls, 1869)
- P. mosquito (Smith, 1863)
- P. moureana Ayala, 1999 [Now placed in genus Asperplebeia]
- P. mutisi Engel, 2022
- P. nigriceps (Friese, 1901)
- P. nigrifacies (Friese, 1900) [Now placed in genus Plectoplebeia]
- P. orphne Engel, 2021
- P. parkeri Ayala, 1999
- P. peruvicola Moure, 1995
- P. phrynostoma Moure, 2004
- P. plectoforma Engel, 2022
- P. pleres Engel, 2021
- P. poecilochroa Moure & Camargo, 1995
- P. pulchra Ayala, 1999
- P. remota (Holmberg, 1903)
- P. roubiki Engel, 2022
- P. saiqui (Friese, 1900)
- P. silveirai Engel, 2022
- P. tica (Wille, 1969) [Now placed in genus Asperplebeia]
- P. tigris Engel, 2022
- P. tobagoensis Moure, 2003
- P. variicolor (Ducke, 1916)
- P. vidali Engel, 2022
- P. wittmanni Moure & Camargo, 1989
