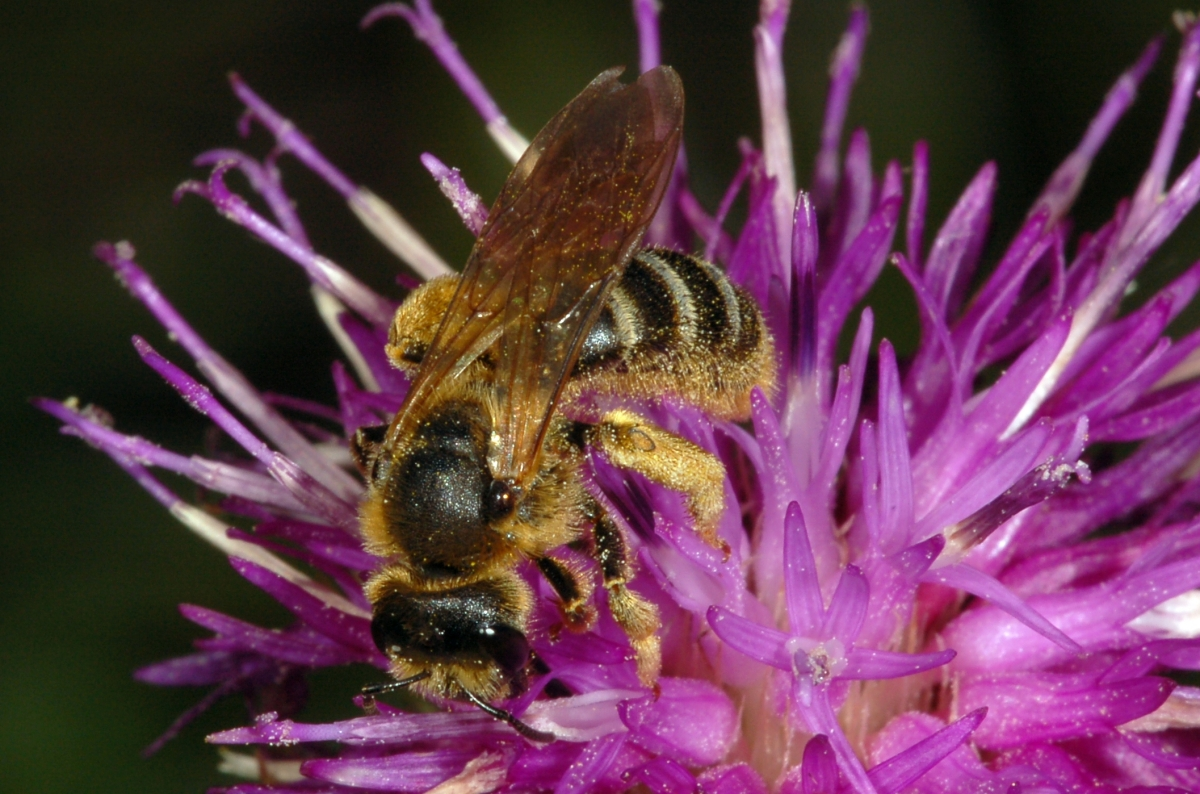
- Female Halictus sexcinctus
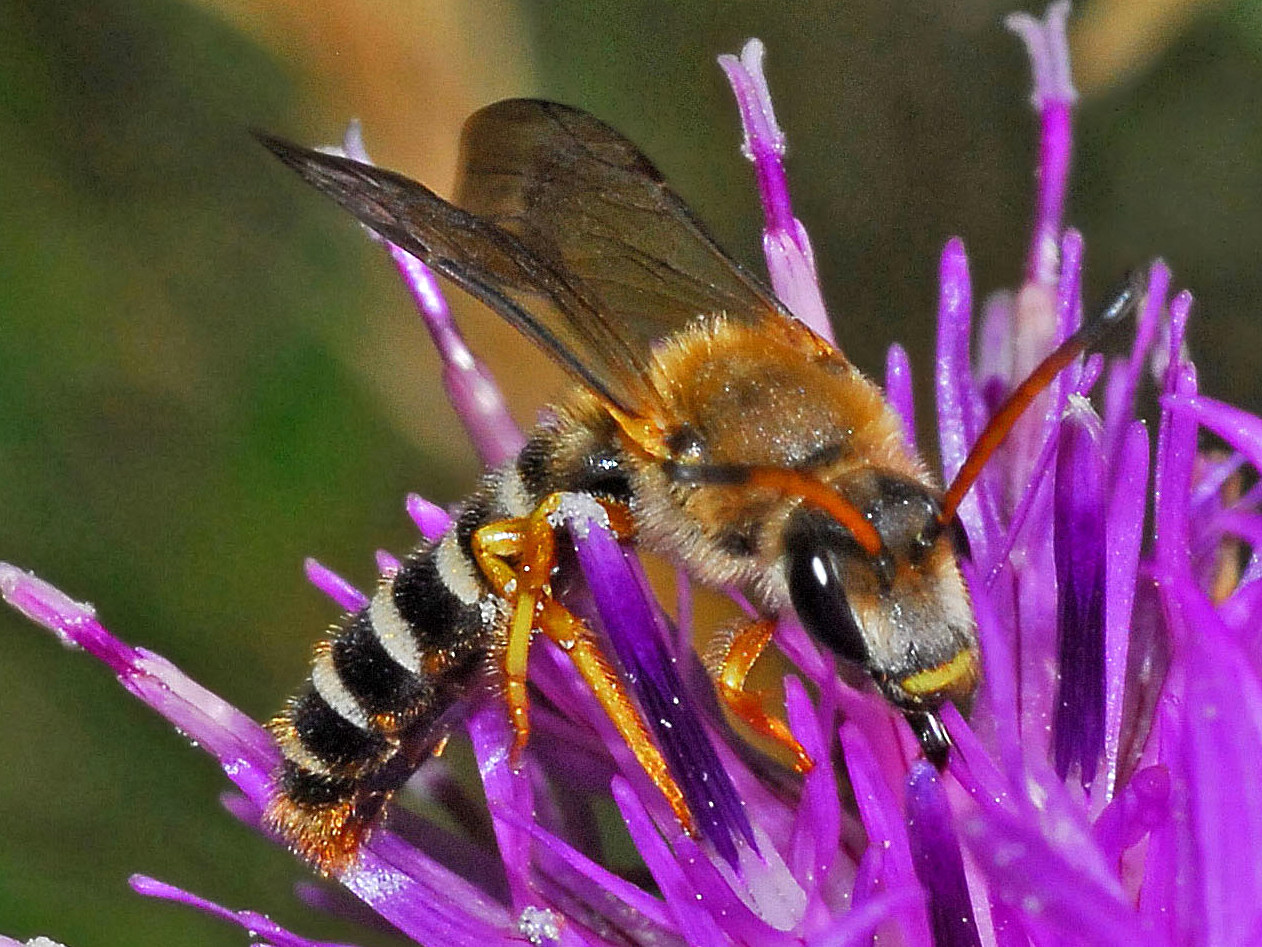
- Male

Scientific classification
- Domain: Eukaryota
- Kingdom: Animalia
- Phylum: Arthropoda
- Class: Insecta
- Order: Hymenoptera
- Family: Halictidae
- Tribe: Halictini
- Genus: Halictus
- Subgenus: Halictus (Hexataenites)
- Species: H. sexcinctus

Binomial name
- Halictus sexcinctus Fabricius, 1775
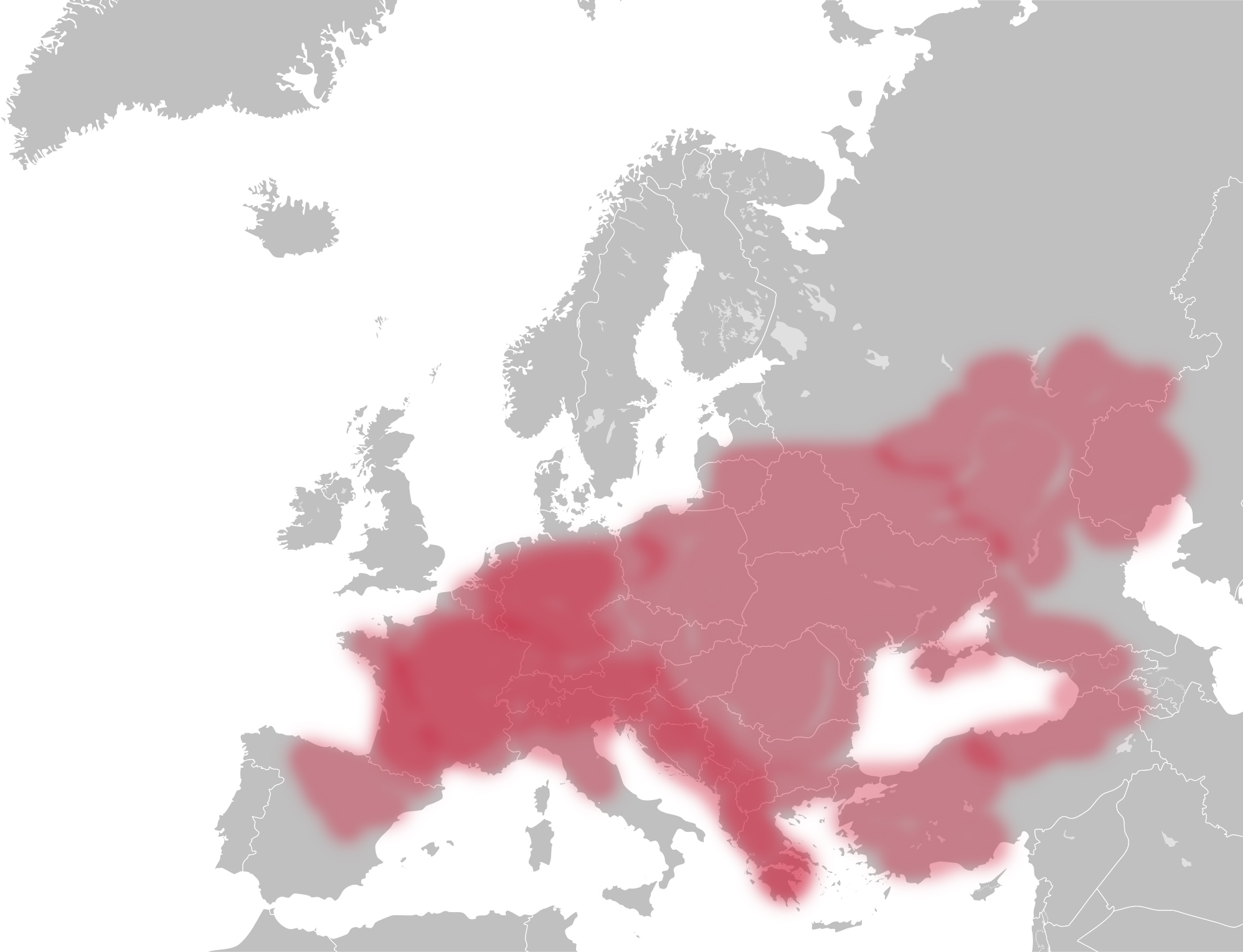
- Halictus sexcintus distribution

= Halictus sexcinctus =

Species of bee

Halictus sexcinctus, commonly referred to as the six-banded furrow bee, is a species of sweat bee found throughout Europe and as far east as Asian Turkey and Iraq. The H. sexcinctus can be easily confused with the closely related species, Halictus scabiosae, due to very similar morphological features. H. sexcinctus show a social polymorphism in which different colonies can exhibit solitary, communal, or eusocial structure. Due to this large variance in social organization, it was suspected that it was not one species at all, but rather multiple, cryptic species. However, genetic analysis was able to confirm these varying populations as one species. H. sexcinctus will forage from multiple flower species, but prefers plant species with wide-open flowers. Their nests can be found dug into the ground in loamy or sandy soil.

== Taxonomy and phylogenetics ==
Halictus sexcinctus is part of the family Halictidae, which are commonly referred to as the sweat bees. Species in the genus Halictus are the most recently evolved in the Halictid family, and H. sexcinctus falls into the most recently evolved clade of the family, which is a eusocial taxa. The family Halictidae has the most eusocial species of any bee family. Study of the sociality of this family has been held back by a lack of understanding of how the species are phylogenetically related, and how closely related species within the family show very different levels of sociality. Due to the different levels of sociality seen with the species, it was first thought possible that H. sexcinctus was actually a cryptic species. A genetic study of their mitochondrial DNA showed H. sexcinctus is in fact one species. However, that study was not definitive, and further studies of their nuclear genes are needed to be sure. H. sexcinctus has been observed to be both solitary and eusocial. Because it belongs to a eusocial clade, its solitary behavior is an evolutionary reversion. However, H. sexcinctus is not alone in this, as there have been multiple losses of eusociality within the genus, such as in the species Halictus rubicundus.

== Description and identification ==
Halictus sexcinctus is a species of ground-nesting bees, previously thought to only exhibit solitary behavior. They are relatively large compared to other sweat bees. They are 14–16 mm in length, and have white felt bands on their abdomens. Workers are typically smaller than foundresses, while foundresses will usually be the largest and most worn individuals in the nest. Sterile and reproductive workers do not differ in size.

=== Sexual dimorphism ===
As is typical among sweat bees, females are larger than males. Males also have slimmer bodies than females and their antennae are longer with a slightly different coloration. H. sexcinctus looks very similar to Halictus scabiosae, so the two are easily confused. Both have ring-like bands on their tergites, with females having anterior and posterior buff-colored bands on tergites 2-4, while males have whitish posterior bands on tergites 2-6. H. sexcinctus differs from H. scabiosae in that males have longer, reddish antennae, and females lack the basal hair bands on tergites 2-4.

=== Social description ===
In eusocial nests, queens show aggressive behavior, and a fight to the death can occur if another female tries to usurp the foundress. However, in communal nests, aggression between females is little to non-existent, and foundresses will continuously join the colony during the founding period from late May to early June. Depending upon the social organization of a particular nest, female workers show a range of behavior, from complete selfishness to eusocial helping. H. sexcinctus has been very important in the understanding of the evolution of eusociality. Phylogenetic analysis suggests that H. sexcinctus has a social ancestor, and that solitary populations are an example of evolutionary reversal.

== Distribution and habitat ==
Halictus sexcinctus are commonly found across Europe, and can be found as far north as southern Sweden and as far east as Turkey and Iraq. They are solitary in the northern part of the range and social in their southern range. They live in very large aggregations in central Europe, despite being solitary in this part of their range. H. sexcinctus prefers to nest in sandy or loamy soil. They use their mandibles to dig nests in the ground or even on vertical substrates if it is made of earth. Their nests consist of a main tunnel dug diagonally into the ground, with several short side chambers off of it leading to brood cells, and a small tumulus around the nest entrance. One egg is laid per cell on top of a nectar-pollen mixture. Females tend to forage in plant species with wide-open flowers, therefore they primarily collect pollen from plants of the family Asteraceae such as asters, daisies, and sunflowers.

== Colony cycle ==
It takes about 4.5–5 weeks for a newly laid H. sexcinctus egg to develop into an adult. Foundresses will on average lay 9.6 eggs in their first brood. The colony cycle lasts around 10–12 weeks, constrained on either side by a winter hibernation.

=== Colony initiation ===
Females hibernate inside their nests in the winter after mating. From the end of May to the beginning of June, they will begin to build new nests, in which they store foraged pollen and nectar. These food reserves in the new nest are used to feed the larvae. The next generation emerges from their pupae (eclose) from July to August, and the females of the previous generation typically die at this time. The newly eclosed females remain in the nest, while the males leave in order to mate with unrelated females in other nests. The males then die in Autumn after mating, while the females enter hibernation, meaning males have a comparatively short lifespan.

=== Colony growth ===
Females from the first brood are called workers, while females of the second brood are called gynes. The workers can be either reproductive or sterile. As soon as the workers emerge, provisioning for the second brood begins. There is overlap between foundress and daughter generations during production of the second brood, and because both daughters and foundresses lay eggs in the second brood, this type of colony cycle is called “partially bivoltine”. Some workers will leave their maternal nest before overwintering so that they can become foundresses in the spring. In one southern Greek population, up to three quarters of females were observed to disappear from their colonies by spring. While some will die, many likely will become foundresses of eusocial colonies. In this Greek population, only about 50% of foundresses survived to the eclosion of the first brood, so it is probably necessary that workers lay many of the second-brood eggs.

== Social polymorphism ==
There is a difference between communal and eusocial organization in halictine bees. Communal colonies do not have castes, but rather multiple females of the same generation work together with relatively little reproductive skew and aggression. These females may or may not be related. Eusocial colonies have a queen (the foundress) and reproductive castes with high reproductive skew and aggression, typically directed from the queen to workers. This type of society is formed when the queen’s progeny become workers. H. sexcinctus has one of the most polymorphic social behaviors discovered in sweat bees so far, similar to Halictus rubicundus. The social polymorphism in H. sexcinctus is one where either a solitary female founds a nest, and sociality emerges in the next generation of females, or several females from the same generation will cofound a new colony. Solitary and communal behavior is seen in the northern range, while populations in the southern range exhibit communal and eusocial structure. It is fairly unusual to find both communal and eusocial behavior exhibited by the same species outside of the halictine bees. H. sexcinctus was the first example of a definite eusocial/communal polymorphism in halictine bees, and may possibly be the most extreme example of intraspecific social polymorphism among insects.

=== Morphological differences due to sociality ===
Communal females range in size from that of a worker to a eusocial queen, but all of them have proportionally shorter wings than those of solitary and eusocial females, indicating that they follow a different developmental pathway. The morphological differences between communal and eusocial individuals represents a novel preimaginal developmental difference, implying that their behavioral differences also have a preimaginal origin. This difference might be brought on by environmental factors during the larval period, such as differential feeding by queens. It has not yet been determined whether the different social organizations arise from phenotypic plasticity brought on by an environmental switch (a trait commonly seen in halictine bees), or based upon genetic differences. Genetic differences could not cause relative sterility because genes for such a trait would not be passed on. The mechanism behind the morphological differences seen between the social strategies is not yet understood.

== Reproductive skew ==
Reproduction between foundresses is shared fairly equally in communal nests, and there is almost no aggression between the females. In all socialites, foundresses tend to show higher levels of ovarian development than workers and are also more likely to mate. Sometimes, workers will actually have more developed ovaries than foundresses. Compared to other Halictus species, H. sexcinctus has a high rate of worker ovarian development. In eusocial colonies there is a reproductive skew favoring queens, but workers still have quite a lot of opportunity for mated reproduction. Unlike many bees, insemination status does not determine which females are queens and which females are workers, though of course only mated females can produce daughters, a necessary requirement of being a queen.

== Sex ratio ==
The majority of offspring produced in the first brood are female, ranging from 74-81% of the offspring. Only about 50% of foundresses survive to the production of the second brood. This means that some unmated workers will produce offspring, which leads to more male offspring being produced in the second brood than in the first. Therefore, the ratio of males produced in the second brood most likely depends upon whether the foundress does or does not survive. Very rarely, foundresses will not mate and thus produce an all-male brood, which therefore means they will not produce a second brood. Less pollen is needed in order to produce males, because they are smaller than gynes. When resources are scarce, the sex ratio may be shifted towards males.

== Division of labor ==
Foundresses tend to show more wear than workers do on their mandibles and wings, suggesting they participate in more work, such as constructing brood cells, maintaining the nest, and provisioning the brood. Workers show “reproductive opportunism,” where their level of altruism can range from entirely altruistic to entirely selfish. It is unclear how exactly this flexibility is possible or how this individual behavior leads to spreads throughout the population. Sterile workers typically show more wear on their wings and mandibles than reproductive workers. This is most likely due to sterile workers performing more work than reproductive workers. This suggests that infertile workers are more altruistic in order to gain inclusive fitness through kin selection, due to the fact that they are unable to produce their own offspring. Some reproductive workers are somewhat altruistic and will help to raise the broods of their sisters and mother. Some, however, are not altruistic and seem only to take care of their own brood, essentially making them parasites to the colony. One reason that communal/eusocial polymorphisms are so rare could be because communal strategies are unstable due to their vulnerability to cheating.

== Parasites ==
A new species of mites, Histiostoma halicticola, was discovered to parasitize H. sexcinctus in a study by Fain et al. In this study, the new species of mite was observed only in the deutonymphal stage. The bees harboring these mites were found in the Döberitzer Heide nature reserve, nearby Berlin, Germany. The mites were found on both males and females. On females, the mites are found in a deep, bristly furrow on the second tergite. This site protects the mites and makes them hard to remove. When a female H. sexcinctus had more than thirty mites on its body, the mites were then found in other areas lacking specific shelter. This shows that the furrow is the preferred spot, and the mites will only settle elsewhere if the furrow is already full. Males lack this particular furrow, so the mites are found on the smooth, concave ventral surface of the thorax between the coxae. H. sexcinctus was also found to harbor mites of the families Pygmephoridae and Scutacaridae.

== Human importance ==
=== Antimicrobial properties of proteins in the venom ===
With the rise of antibiotic resistant bacteria, the need to find antimicrobial substances that function differently than current antibiotics is incredibly important. Antimicrobial peptides (AMPs) are commonly found in the venom of arthropods, and these proteins function by breaking up bacterial cell membranes. However, these AMPs will often also damage eukaryotic cells, typically red blood cells. A substance that damages human red blood cells will be less valuable as an antibiotic for obvious reasons. AMPs that damaged red blood cells at low rates were found in the venom of several species of bees, leading to a study of the venom of H. sexcinctus. Two newly isolated peptides from the venom were found to be significantly different in structure to any other AMPs in the antimicrobial peptide database. These new proteins showed effective antimicrobial activity against four strains of bacteria (B. subtilis, S. aureus, E. coli, and P. aeruginosa) and a yeast pathogen (C. albicans). While these proteins isolated from H. sexcinctus venom show good antimicrobial properties, they also show found to damage red blood cells (hemolysis), reducing their therapeutic potential. However, when their structures were modified a few analogs with slightly lower hemolytic activity were discovered, meriting further study.

=== Understanding the evolution of eusociality ===
Sweat bees are important model organisms for studying the evolution of social behavior, because they show a wide variety of social strategies. H. sexcinctus behavior is important in understanding the evolution of eusociality because it was previously thought that a communal social organization was a transitional step to eusociality. However, because these communal and eusocial strategies exist separately without transition in this species, the data do not support that theory. As shown by phylogenetics, communal behavior may actually be a transition step between eusocial behavior and the reversion to solitary behavior.
