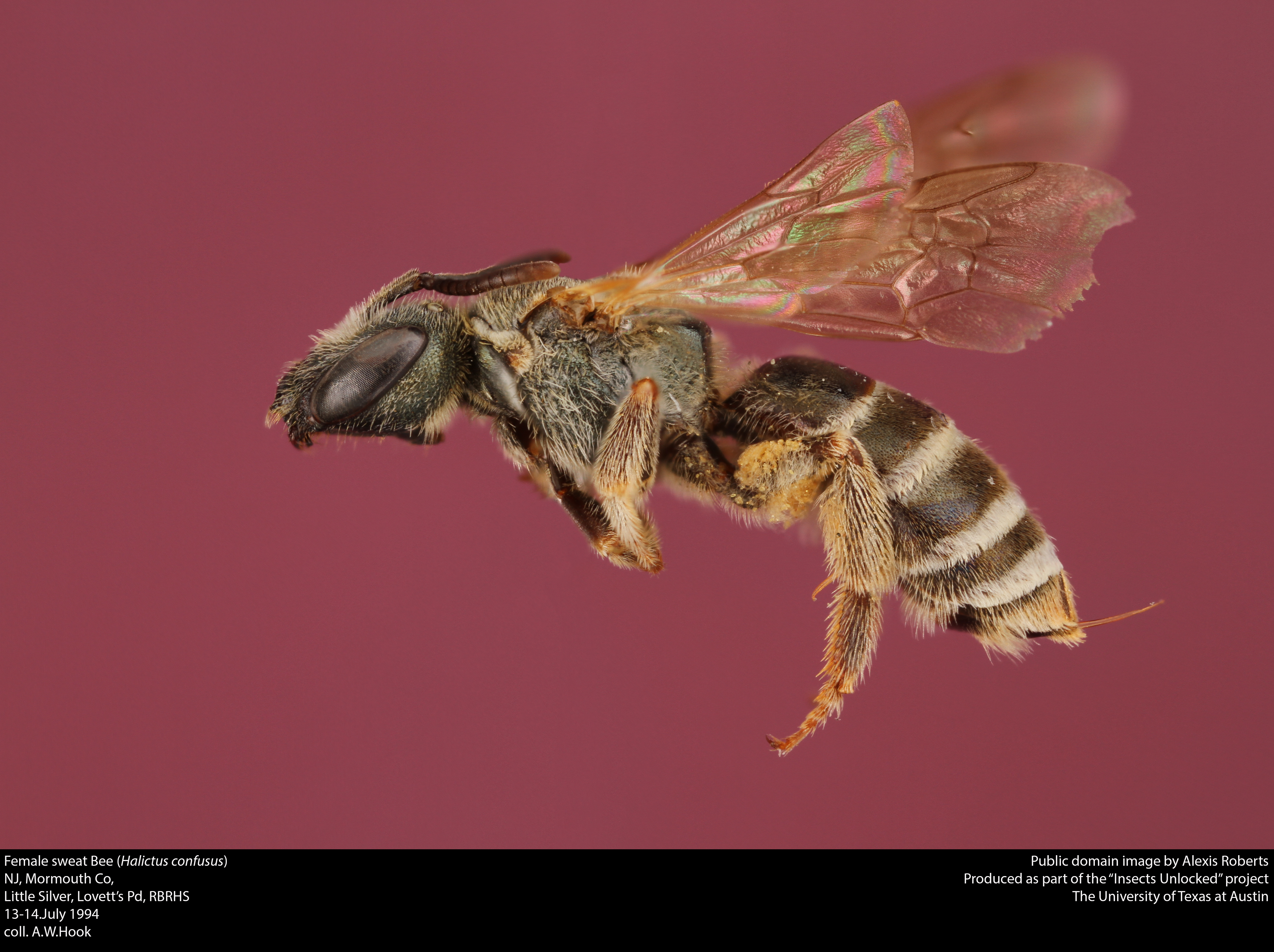

Conservation status
- Secure (NatureServe)

Scientific classification
- Kingdom: Animalia
- Phylum: Arthropoda
- Class: Insecta
- Order: Hymenoptera
- Family: Halictidae
- Genus: Halictus
- Species: H. confusus

Binomial name
- Halictus confusus Smith, 1853

Synonyms
- Halictus alpinus Alfken, 1907; Halictus constrictus Provancher, 1882; Halictus provancheri Dalla Torre, 1896; Halictus nearcticus Vachal, 1904; Halictus perkinsi Blüthgen, 1925; Halictus (Pachyceble) confusus confusus Smith, 1853; Seladonia (Pachyceble) confusa (Smith, 1853); Halictus arapahonum Cockerell, 1906; Halictus (Chloralictus) olivarius Sandhouse, 1924

= Halictus confusus =

Species of bee

Halictus confusus, the southern bronze furrow bee or confused sweat bee, is a species of sweat bee in the family Halictidae. It is a primitively eusocial bee species found in open habitats in Eurasia and North America.

== Description ==
Halictus confusus is 7 millimetres (0.28 in) in length, the forewing is 5.5 millimetres (0.22 in) long. Females have a greenish head and thorax, darkening to blackish on the clypeus and black on the abdomen, with metallic greenish highlights. The legs are blackish, becoming reddish distally. The head is slightly broader than long, with the eyes slightly converging ventrally and the clypeus obviously protruding. The wings are hyaline, with yellow venation, and the tegulae are yellowish anteriorly and otherwise reddish. Males are generally similar, but the mandibles, labrum, and outer third of the clypeus are yellow, the wing venation is more reddish, and the legs have a narrow outer yellowish stripe on the tibia and yellowish tarsi. In Britain and Europe this species could easily be confused with Halictus tumulorum and can only be reliably separated by examining the genitalia of the males; more subtle features are that fresh female H. confusus have wider pale banding on tergites 3 and 4 while males have more yellow on the joints of the hind and middle legs.

== Susbspecies and distribution ==
Halictus confusus is widely distributed in Europe, Asia and North America. A number of subspecies have been described, among which are:

- H. c. confusus Smith, 1853 - North America
- H. c. alpinus Alfken, 1907 - This subspecies has been recorded from China, Poland, Spain and Switzerland
- H. c. arapahonum Cockerell, 1906 - Midwest North America
- H. c. pelagius Ebmer, 1996 - Russia
- H. c. perkinsi Blüthgen, 1926 - western Europe, except for the higher mountains and China

In Great Britain this species has a southerly distribution from Dorset east to Kent and north to Norfolk. In North America its distribution extends from Nova Scotia to North Dakota southwards into Florida and Texas.

== Habitat and biology ==
Halictus confusus in Britain shows a strong association with sandy areas, such as sandy heaths and sand pits, but in other areas this species appears to be more generalist in its habitat choices, given its wide range. It is a polylectic bee which feeds on a wide variety of flowers, visiting a variety throughout the season. In one study in North America, spring beauty (Claytonia virginica) was favoured by the newly emerged queens, while the toothwort Cardamine concatenata was used to a lesser extent. When these woodland flowers faded in April the bees switched to dandelions as their main food source. These early plants were mainly used to immediately feed the newly active bees. When the wintercress (Barbarea vulgaris) began to flower abundantly in meadows and orchards this species became the main plant used, and the bees collected this pollen for provisioning their nests. When flowers became scarce in late May the bees still foraged but widened their choice of flowers visited, until they closed the nests off in June and remained in the nests with the developing brood. When the first brood of workers emerged, these and subsequent broods foraged on clover. In late summer, the last brood fed on other species of flower as the clovers faded, including Lespedeza lineata and Symphyotrichum ericoides. These late bees were reproductive females and males, the females of which would overwinter after mating.

Halictus confusus nests in aggregations and exhibits a primitive form of eusociality, with castes that are behaviorally distinct but not morphologically different. The nests have the potential to develop into a matriarchy with a mother queen and daughter workers. A queen will found a new nest each Spring which has a horizontal entrance tunnel beneath a mound, this entrance is guarded by the bees. In this species, as in related species, the workers may become reproductively capable, and the queen's ability to prevent this depends on the size of the colony and the difference in size between the queen and the workers.

Foraging adults are preyed on by crab spiders and predatory bugs while ants are the main predators of the nests, especially unguarded nests, although they may attack guarded nests by overcoming the guard bee. The main parasites of the adult females are flies of the family Conopidae, while flies of the family Phoridae will lay eggs within the nests, tailgating returning workers to get past the guards. The parasitic beetle Ripiphorus walshi is a larval parasite and its triungulin larvae attach themselves to the adults when they visit flowers and are transported back to the nest. Other parasites include fungi and nematodes.

== Conservation status ==
While H. confusus is listed as Secure on NatureServe, it has been listed as Vulnerable in Belgium (recorded as Seladonia confusa).
