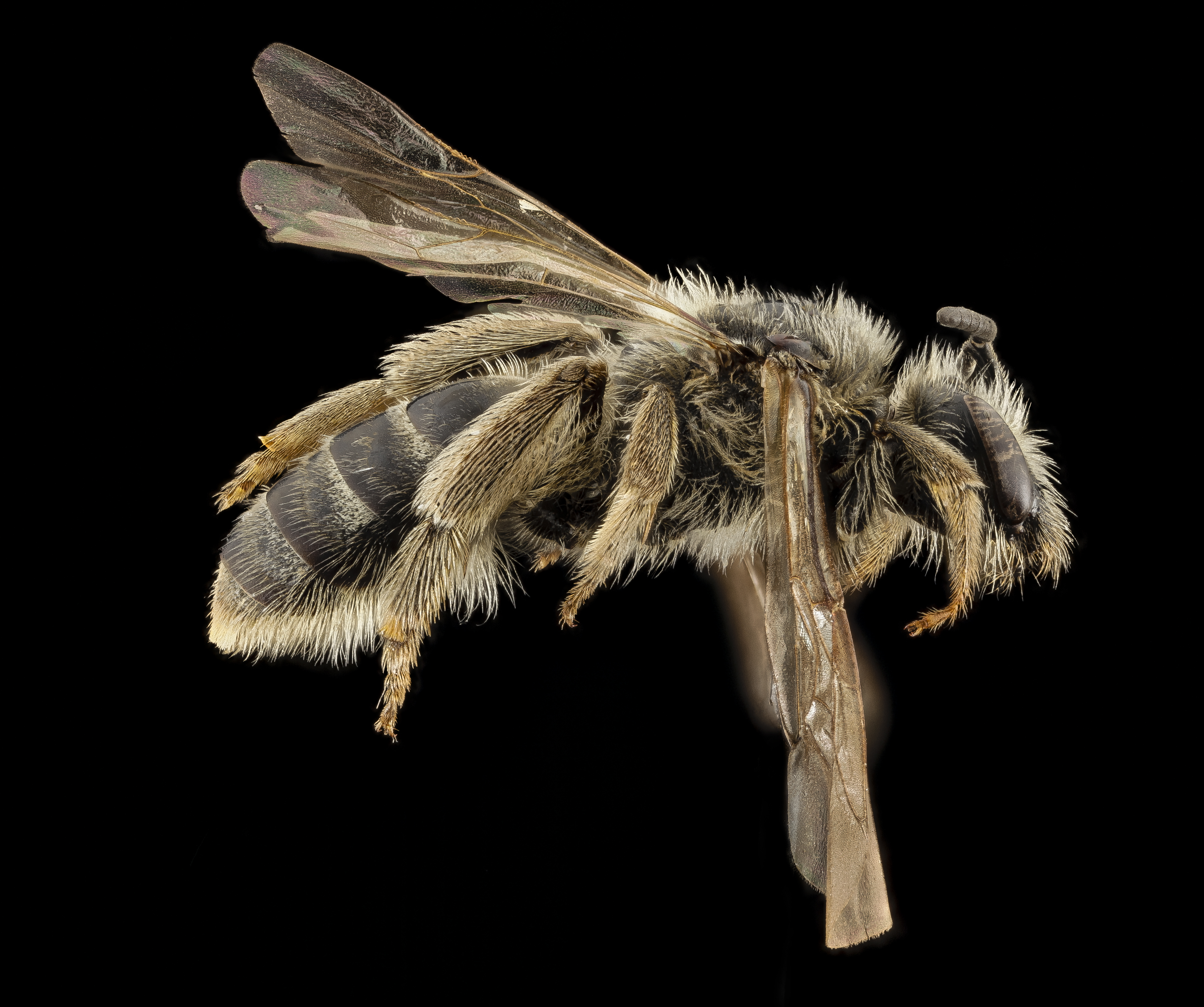

Scientific classification
- Domain: Eukaryota
- Kingdom: Animalia
- Phylum: Arthropoda
- Class: Insecta
- Order: Hymenoptera
- Family: Halictidae
- Tribe: Halictini
- Genus: Lasioglossum
- Species: L. titusi

Binomial name
- Lasioglossum titusi (Crawford, 1902)

= Lasioglossum titusi =

Species of bee

Lasioglossum titusi is a species of sweat bee in the family Halictidae. It is a solitary bee that nests in the soil, often in flat, bare ground. Nests may be aggregated.

== Pollen Specialization ==
Lasioglossum titusi is a polylectic species, meaning it collects pollen from a wide variety of plant species.

== Distribution ==
Lasioglossum titusi is found in North America.
