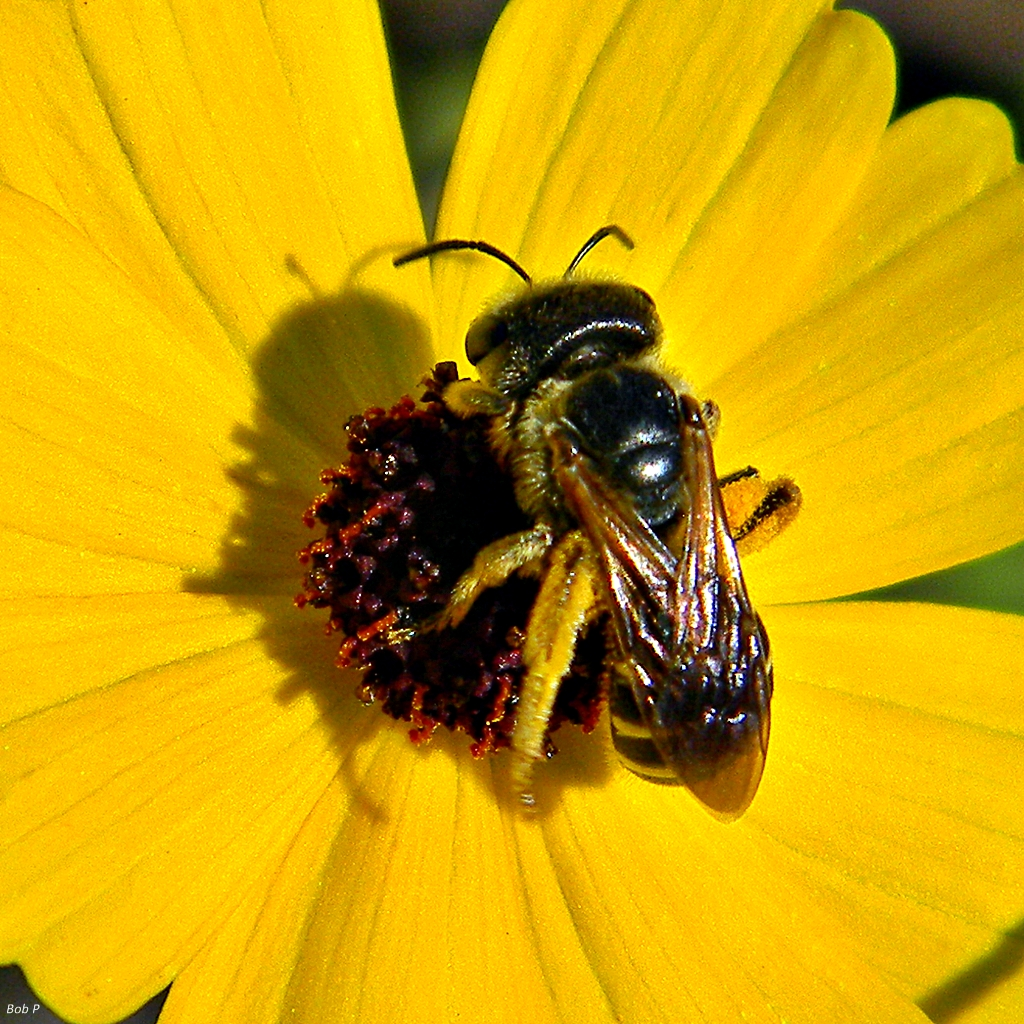

Scientific classification
- Kingdom: Animalia
- Phylum: Arthropoda
- Class: Insecta
- Order: Hymenoptera
- Family: Halictidae
- Tribe: Halictini
- Genus: Halictus
- Species: H. poeyi

Binomial name
- Halictus poeyi Lepeletier, 1841

= Halictus poeyi =

Species of bee

Halictus poeyi, or Poey's furrow bee, is a species of sweat bee in the family Halictidae. It is found in the southeastern United States, and is morphologically indistinguishable from Halictus ligatus.

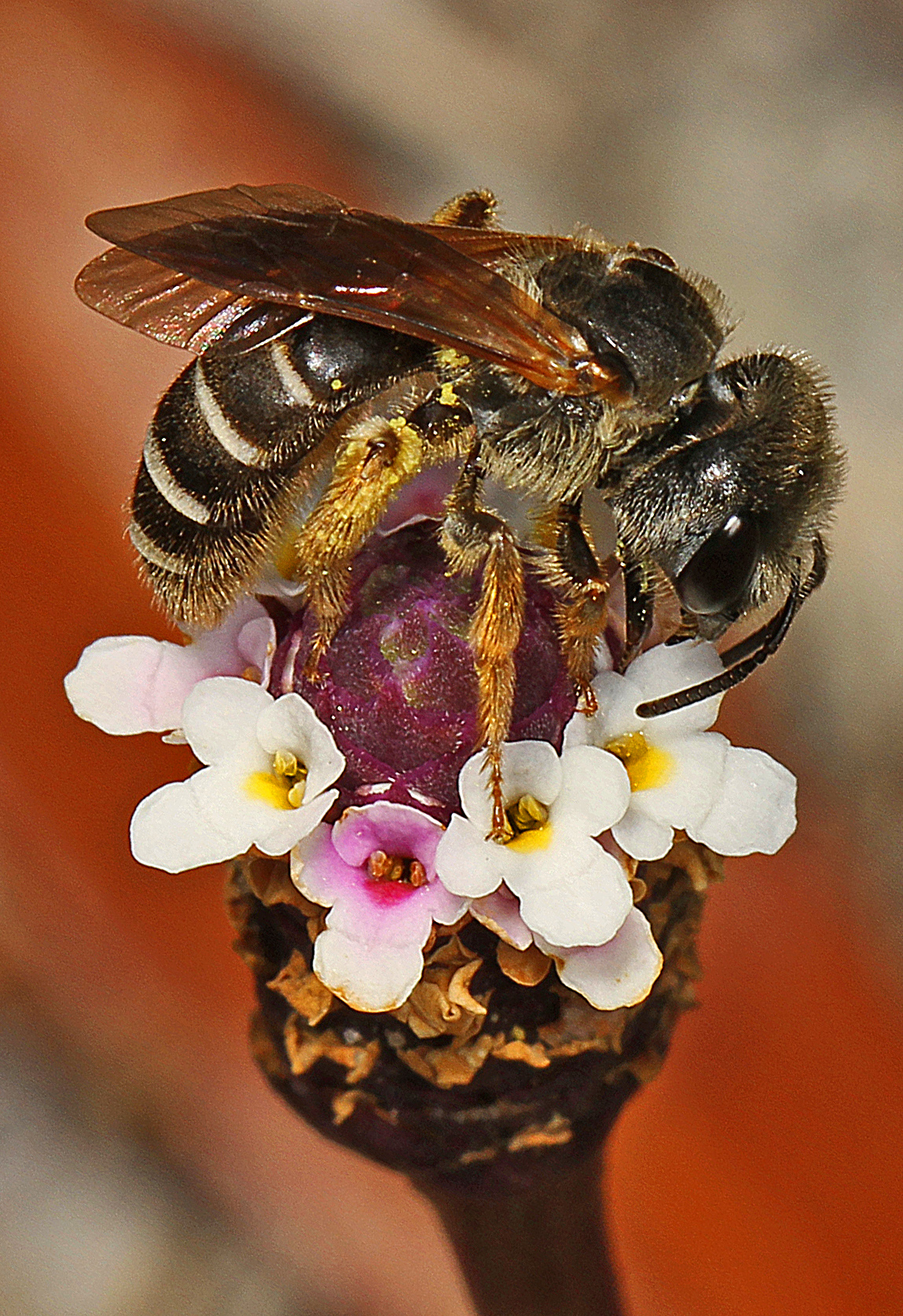
Poey's furrow bee, Halictus poeyi
