= Halictus lucidipennis =

Scientific classification
- Domain: Eukaryota
- Kingdom: Animalia
- Phylum: Arthropoda
- Class: Insecta
- Order: Hymenoptera
- Family: Halictidae
- Tribe: Halictini
- Genus: Halictus
- Species: H. lucidipennis

Binomial name
- Halictus lucidipennis Smith, 1853

Synonyms
- Halictus varipes Morawitz, 1876; Halictus niloticus Smith, 1879; Halictus vernalis Smith, 1879; Halictus magrettii Vachal, 1892; Halictus dives Pérez, 1895; Halictus omanicus Pérez, 1907; Halictus variipes var koptica Blüthgen, 1933; Halictus (Seladonia) sudanicus Cockerell, 1945; Halictus (Seladonia) tokarensis Cockerell, 1945; Halictus (Seladonia) dissensis Cockerell, 1945; Halictus (Seladonia) medanicus Cockerell, 1945; Halictus (Seladonia) mogrensis Cockerell, 1945; Halictus (Seladonia) tokariellus Cockerell, 1945; Halictus (Seladonia) medaniellus Cockerell, 1945; Halictus (Seladonia) morinellus hyemalus Warncke, 1982; Seladonia (Seladonia) lucidipennis (Smith, 1853)

Species of bee

Halictus lucidipennis is a species of bee in the genus Halictus, of the family Halictidae.
