= Halictus hotoni =

Scientific classification
- Kingdom: Animalia
- Phylum: Arthropoda
- Class: Insecta
- Order: Hymenoptera
- Family: Halictidae
- Tribe: Halictini
- Genus: Halictus
- Subgenus: Halictus (Seladonia)
- Species: H. hotoni

Binomial name
- Halictus hotoni Vachal, 1903

Species of bee

Halictus hotoni, Hoton's metallic-furrow bee, is a species of sweat bee in the family Halictidae native to southern Africa and introduced to Australia. It was initially identified as the emerald metallic-furrow bee (Halictus smaragdulus). It was described by Joseph Vachal in 1903.

== Taxonomy ==
It is treated by some as Seladonia hotoni, while others place Seladonia as a subgenus of Halictus.

== Description ==
It is metallic green and similar in size to the Australian native bee, Lipotriches flavoviridis, 6 to 8 mm long.

== Invasive species ==
Hoton's metallic-furrow bee is native to southern Africa but has spread to Australia. It was originally identified as Halictus (Seladonia) smaragdulus, but an assessment of mitochondrial DNA and comparison of morphology identified the bees found in Australia as Halictus hotoni.

Because introduced bees may compete with native animals, disrupt plant pollination and transmit parasites and pathogens, scientists are concerned about the arrival of metallic-furrow bees in Australia. It was discovered by chance in the Hunter Valley, New South Wales (NSW), in late 2004. Although a recent introduction – which hadn’t been observed in past surveys, it was already well established. Bioclimatic models suggest it will spread across much of southern Australia. It is not known how Hoton's metallic-furrow bee entered Australia.

=== Impacts ===
Little is known about the impacts of metallic-furrow bees in Australia and funding for research has been reportedly negligible. However, experts claim that the metallic-furrow bees could have serious impacts due to its long seasonal activity, apparent preference for introduced plants and high relative abundance, being the second most common bee trapped in some places.

Potential environmental impacts include:

- Competing with native fauna for food resources and nest sites. At least 14 species of bee – 13 of which are native, are potentially threatened by Hoton's metallic-furrow bee.
- Transmitting parasites and pathogens to native plants and animals;
- Disrupting native plant pollination.
- Increasing the spread of invasive plants by pollinating them. The metallic-furrow bees has been noted to prefer introduced plants including Galenia pubescens, which is a declared noxious weed in some parts of NSW.

Potential economic and social impacts include costs associated with increased weed spread and the spread of parasites and pathogens to commercial bee hives.

=== Biosecurity ===
Currently there are no response plans for metallic-furrow bees in Australia. Experts warn that by the time the impacts of metallic-furrow bees become obvious it could be too late for eradication or containment. Scientists advise that it would be 'prudent to prevent further introductions' and are calling for national risk assessments, pathway analyses and contingency plans to reduce the risks of further incursions.
