= Halictus parallelus =

Scientific classification
- Domain: Eukaryota
- Kingdom: Animalia
- Phylum: Arthropoda
- Class: Insecta
- Order: Hymenoptera
- Family: Halictidae
- Tribe: Halictini
- Genus: Halictus
- Species: H. parallelus

Binomial name
- Halictus parallelus Say, 1837

Species of bee

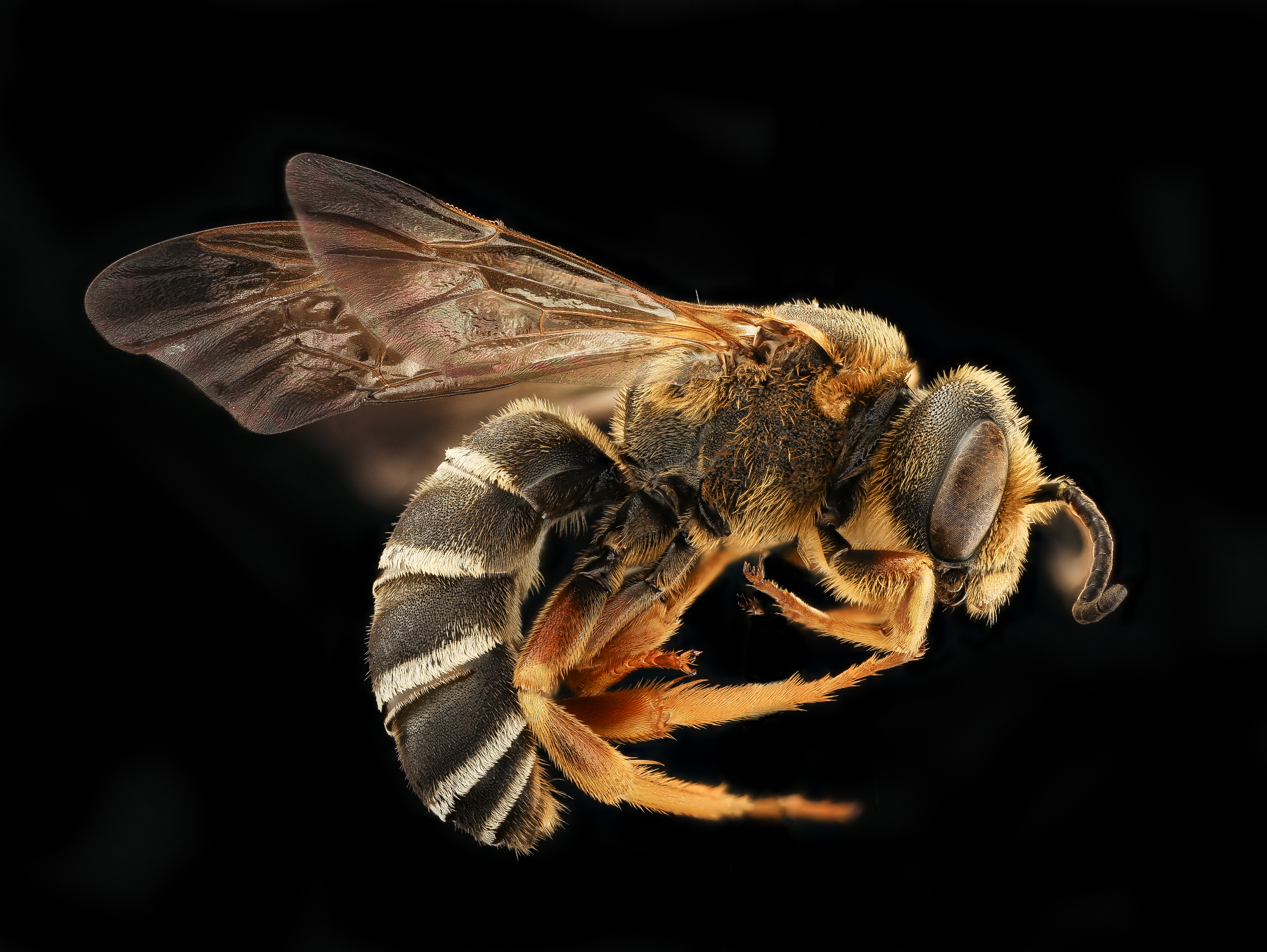
Halictus parallelus, preserved specimen

Halictus parallelus is a species of sweat bee in the family Halictidae.
