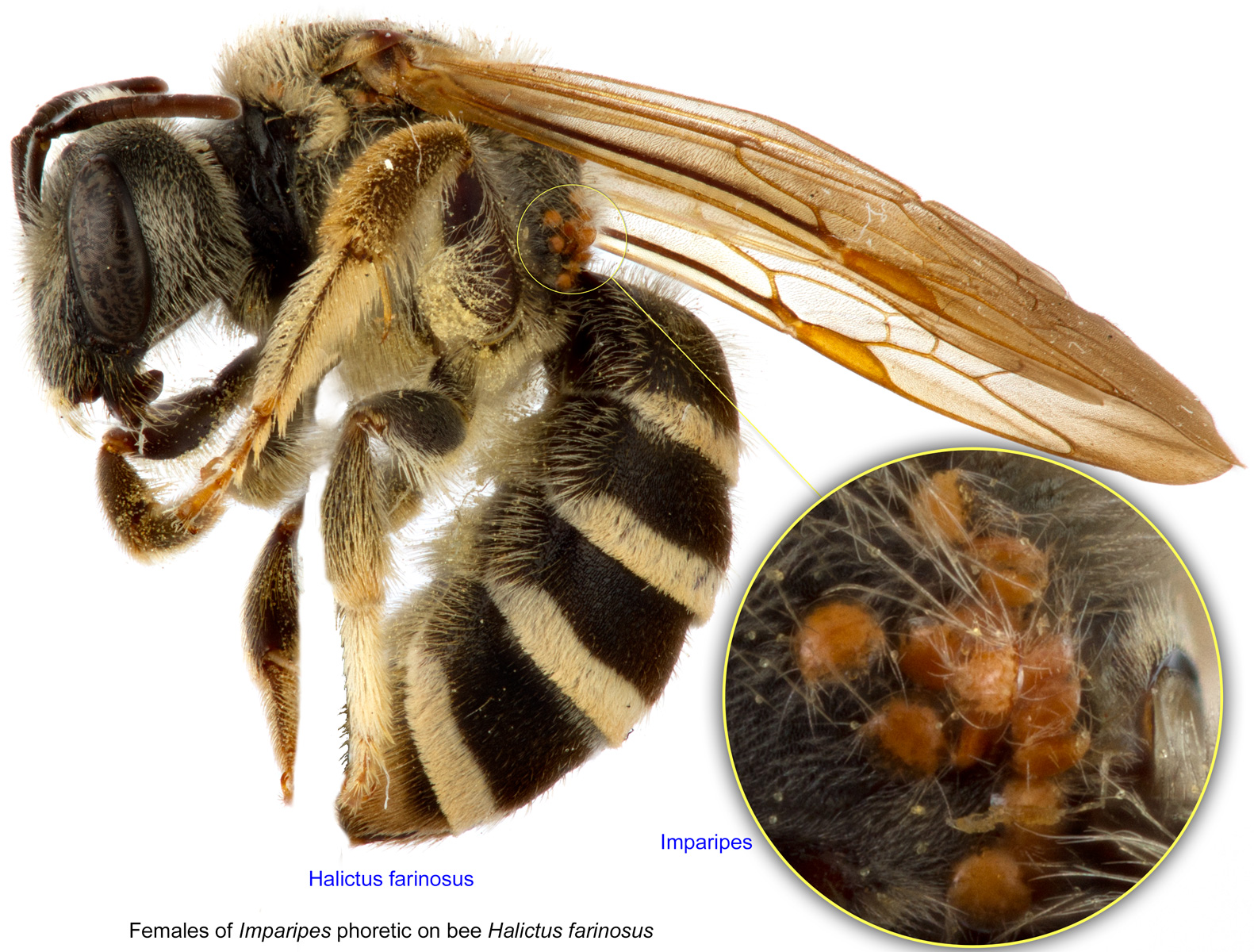

Scientific classification
- Kingdom: Animalia
- Phylum: Arthropoda
- Clade: Pancrustacea
- Class: Insecta
- Order: Hymenoptera
- Family: Halictidae
- Tribe: Halictini
- Genus: Halictus
- Species: H. farinosus

Binomial name
- Halictus farinosus Smith, 1853

= Halictus farinosus =

Species of bee

Halictus farinosus, the wide-striped sweat bee, is a species of ground-nesting sweat bee in the family Halictidae. The species is a primitively eusocial bee, of intermediate social strength when compared to other social species in the genus Halictus.
