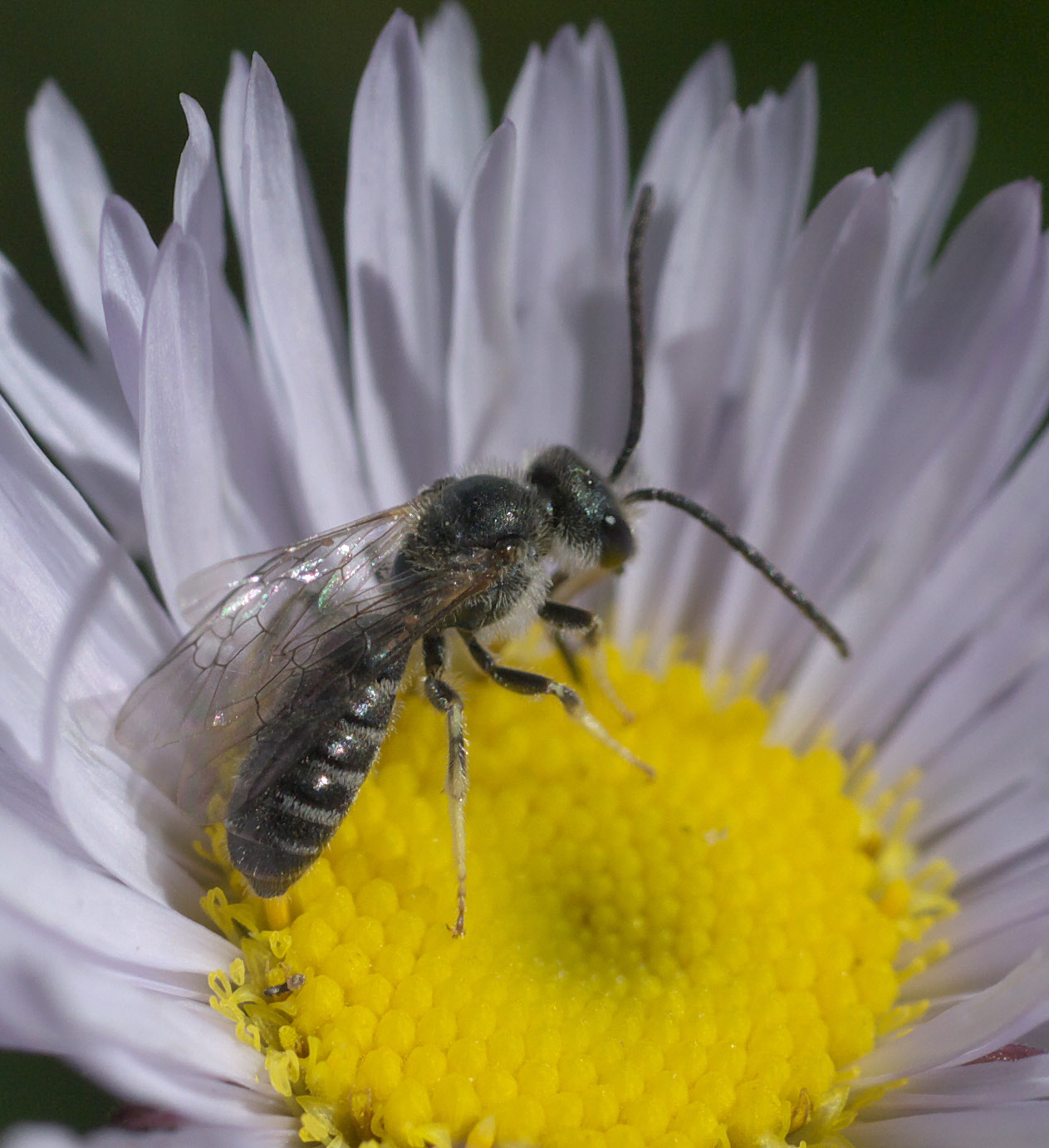

Scientific classification
- Kingdom: Animalia
- Phylum: Arthropoda
- Class: Insecta
- Order: Hymenoptera
- Family: Halictidae
- Tribe: Halictini
- Genus: Halictus
- Species: H. virgatellus

Binomial name
- Halictus virgatellus Cockerell, 1901

= Halictus virgatellus =

Species of bee

Halictus virgatellus is a species of sweat bee in the family Halictidae.
