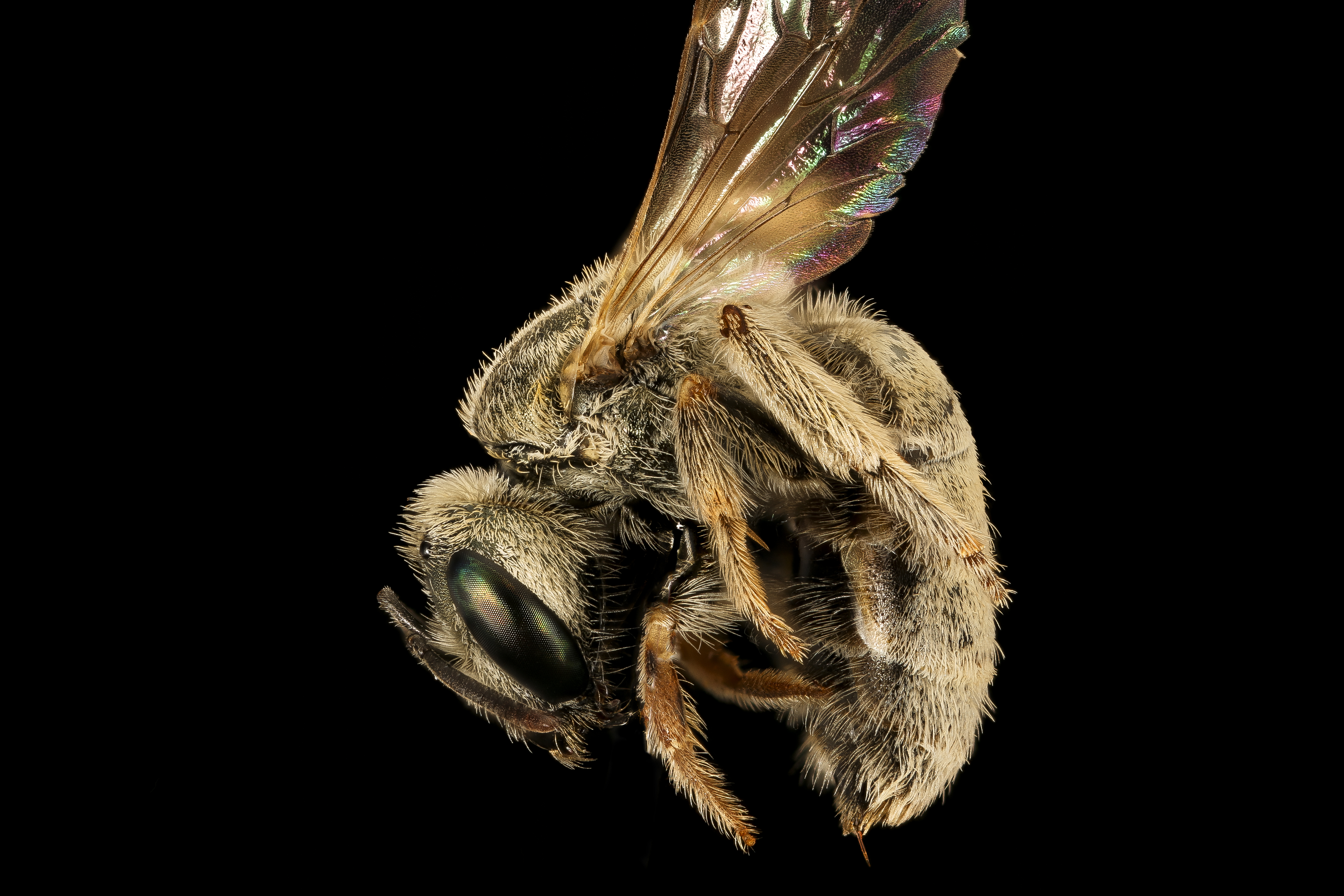

Scientific classification
- Kingdom: Animalia
- Phylum: Arthropoda
- Class: Insecta
- Order: Hymenoptera
- Family: Halictidae
- Tribe: Halictini
- Genus: Halictus
- Species: H. tectus

Binomial name
- Halictus tectus Radoszkowski, 1875

= Halictus tectus =

Species of bee

Halictus tectus is a species of sweat bee in the family Halictidae. Its native range extends from southern Europe to Mongolia. It was introduced from southern Europe to the east coast of the United States, being first recorded there in 2000, with records from Maryland/Washington, D.C., Pennsylvania, and New Hampshire. In the U.S., Sam Droege of the USGS Bee Inventory and Monitoring Lab noted that this species seemingly prefers "highly disturbed areas with European weeds".
