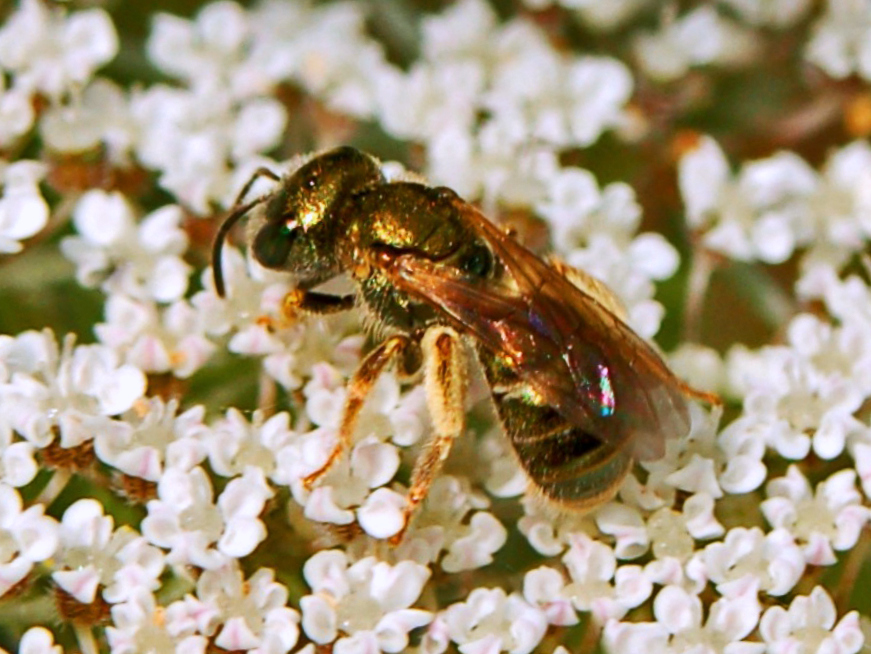
- Halictus gemmeus. Female

Scientific classification
- Domain: Eukaryota
- Kingdom: Animalia
- Phylum: Arthropoda
- Class: Insecta
- Order: Hymenoptera
- Family: Halictidae
- Tribe: Halictini
- Genus: Halictus
- Species: H. gemmeus

Binomial name
- Halictus gemmeus Dours, 1872

Synonyms
- Seladonia gemmea (Dours 1872); Lasioglossum gemmeus (Dours, 1872)

= Halictus gemmeus =

Species of bee

Halictus gemmeus is a species of bee in the family Halictidae, the sweat bees.

== Distribution ==
Halictus gemmeus is a Mediterranean species present in Portugal, Spain, France, Italy, Greece, Turkey, Syria, Algeria, Morocco and western Sahara.

== Bibliography ==
- Pesenko, Y. A. 2004. The phylogeny and classification of the tribe Halictini, with special reference to the Halictus genus-group (Hymenoptera: Halictidae). Zoosystematica Rossica, 13: 83-113.
- Rasmont, P., Ebmer, A.P., Banaszak, J. & van der Zanden, G. 1995. Hymenoptera Apoidea Gallica - Liste taxonomique des abeilles de France, de Suisse et du Grand-Duché de Luxembourg. Bulletin de la Société entomologique de France, 100: 1-98.
