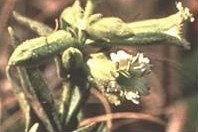

Conservation status
- Imperiled (NatureServe)

Scientific classification
- Kingdom: Plantae
- Clade: Tracheophytes
- Clade: Angiosperms
- Clade: Eudicots
- Order: Caryophyllales
- Family: Caryophyllaceae
- Genus: Silene
- Species: S. spaldingii

Binomial name
- Silene spaldingii S.Watson

= Silene spaldingii =

Species of flowering plant

Silene spaldingii is a rare species of flowering plant in the family Caryophyllaceae known by the common names Spalding's silene, Spalding's catchfly and Spalding's campion. It is native to eastern Washington, eastern Oregon, northern Idaho and northern Montana, where its distribution extends just into British Columbia, Canada. Much of its former habitat has been converted to agriculture and its range is now limited to the last remaining stretches of pristine prairie grassland in this region. It is threatened by the degradation and loss of its remaining habitat. It is federally listed as a threatened species in the United States and it is designated endangered by Canada's COSEWIC.

This is a perennial herb producing many stems and shoots from a thick taproot and woody, branching caudex. The stems grow erect 20–60 cm (8–24 in) in maximum height. They are somewhat hairy and sticky in texture. Lance-shaped leaves occur in pairs along the stems, each blade up to 7 centimeters long. The inflorescence is an open cyme of flowers with greenish-white petals. The base of the flower is enclosed in a tubular 10-veined calyx of sepals. Blooming occurs in June and July. Flowers are pollinated by the bumblebee Bombus fervidus, as well as the sweat bee Halictus tripartitus.

This plant is present in several regions in the northwestern United States and far southern British Columbia, such as the Palouse, the Channeled Scablands, and the Blue Mountains ecoregion, including the Zumwalt Prairie. The latter contains the largest population, which has over 10,000 individuals. A large percentage of the populations are located in Montana. Recent surveys have led to the discovery of additional subpopulations and populations.

This species distribution has been reduced to patchy, geographically isolated fragments mainly due to the loss of its habitat to agriculture. This is an ongoing threat. Other threats include grazing by livestock and wildlife, and the invasion of introduced species of plants, two types of disturbance the plant does not tolerate. Other threats include the lack of a normal fire regime, insect damage, drought, and climate change. Gravel mining, herbicides, and off-road vehicles are threats in some areas. Populations are generally small, making them vulnerable. For example, a population consisting of a single plant was eliminated when it was buried during road construction in Idaho.

The plant displays prolonged dormancy, where it persists underground for one or more years at time surviving on carbohydrate stores in its long taproot. The trait results in some difficulty when monitoring the plant.
