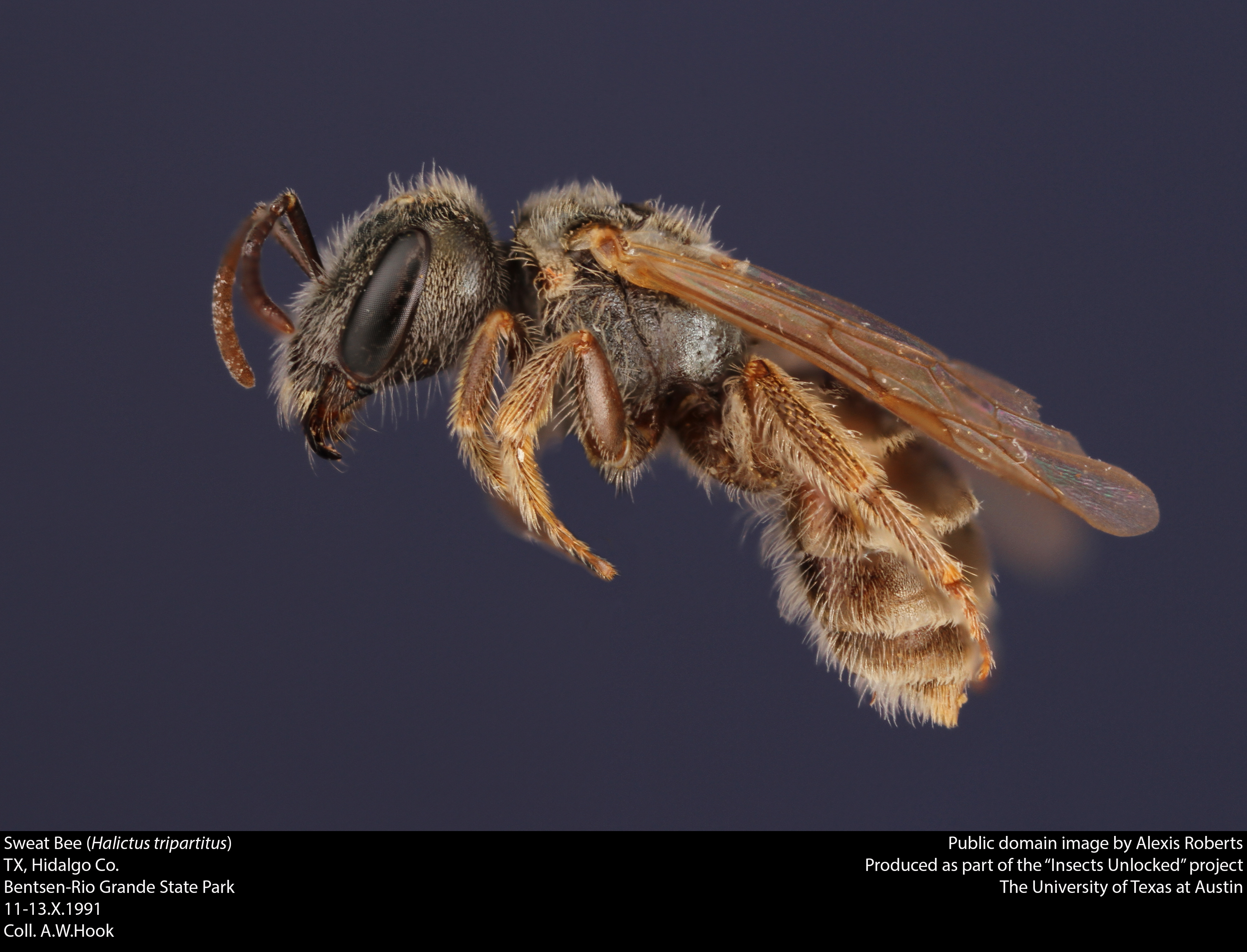

Scientific classification
- Domain: Eukaryota
- Kingdom: Animalia
- Phylum: Arthropoda
- Class: Insecta
- Order: Hymenoptera
- Family: Halictidae
- Tribe: Halictini
- Genus: Halictus
- Species: H. tripartitus

Binomial name
- Halictus tripartitus Cockerell, 1895

= Halictus tripartitus =

Species of bee

Halictus tripartitus is a species of sweat bee in the family Halictidae. It is partially eusocial, with nests connected underground and some workers capable of reproducing. The species is a pollinator of Silene spaldingii.
