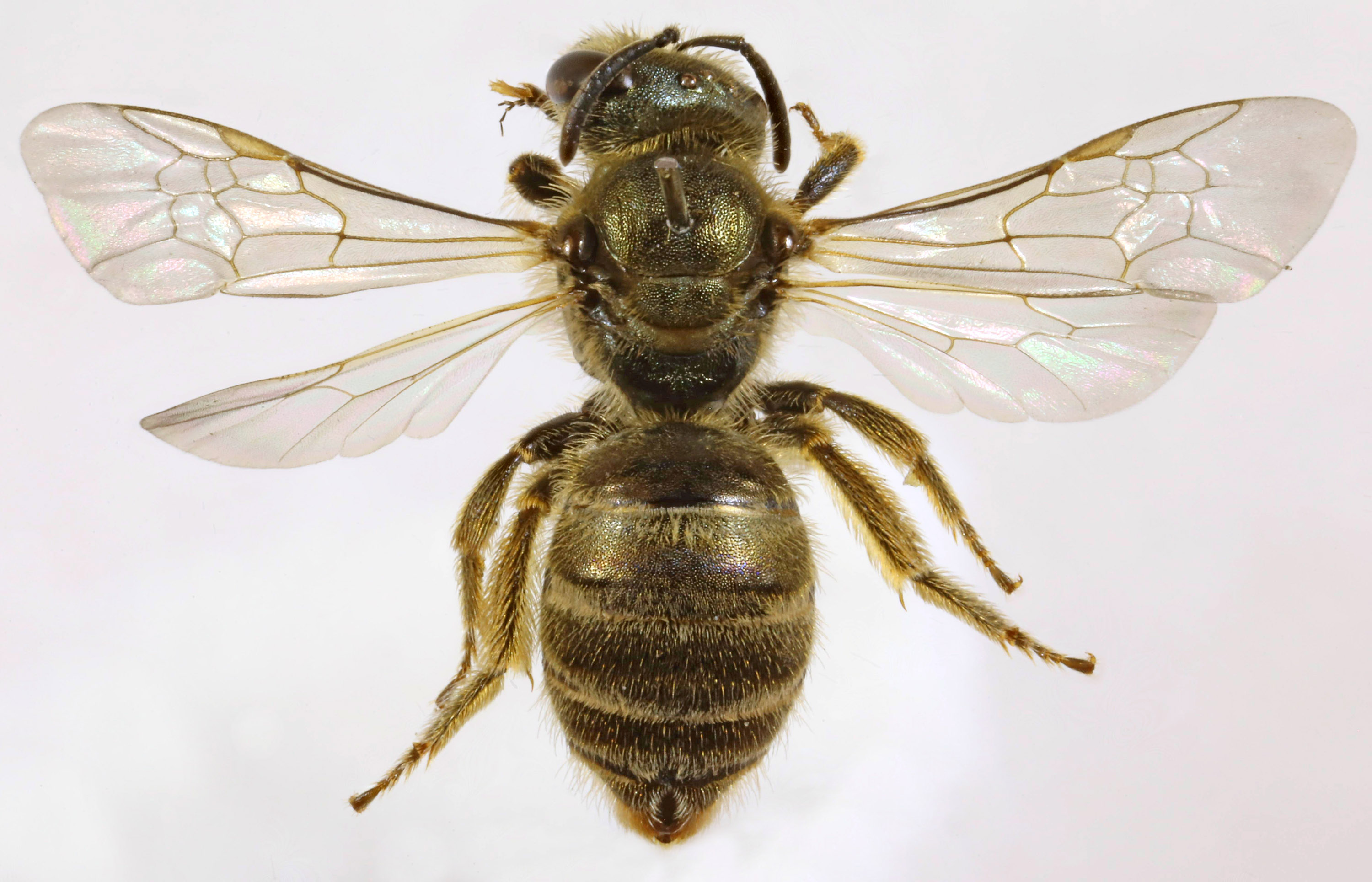
- Halictus tumulorum female, Bagillt, North Wales

Scientific classification
- Kingdom: Animalia
- Phylum: Arthropoda
- Clade: Pancrustacea
- Class: Insecta
- Order: Hymenoptera
- Family: Halictidae
- Subfamily: Halictinae
- Tribe: Halictini
- Genus: Halictus
- Species: H. tumulorum

Binomial name
- Halictus tumulorum (Linnaeus,1758)

= Halictus tumulorum =

Species of bee

Halictus tumulorum is a Palearctic species of sweat bee.

Females are often pollinators of Cypripedium calceolus.

== Distribution ==
The species is native to the British Isles.
