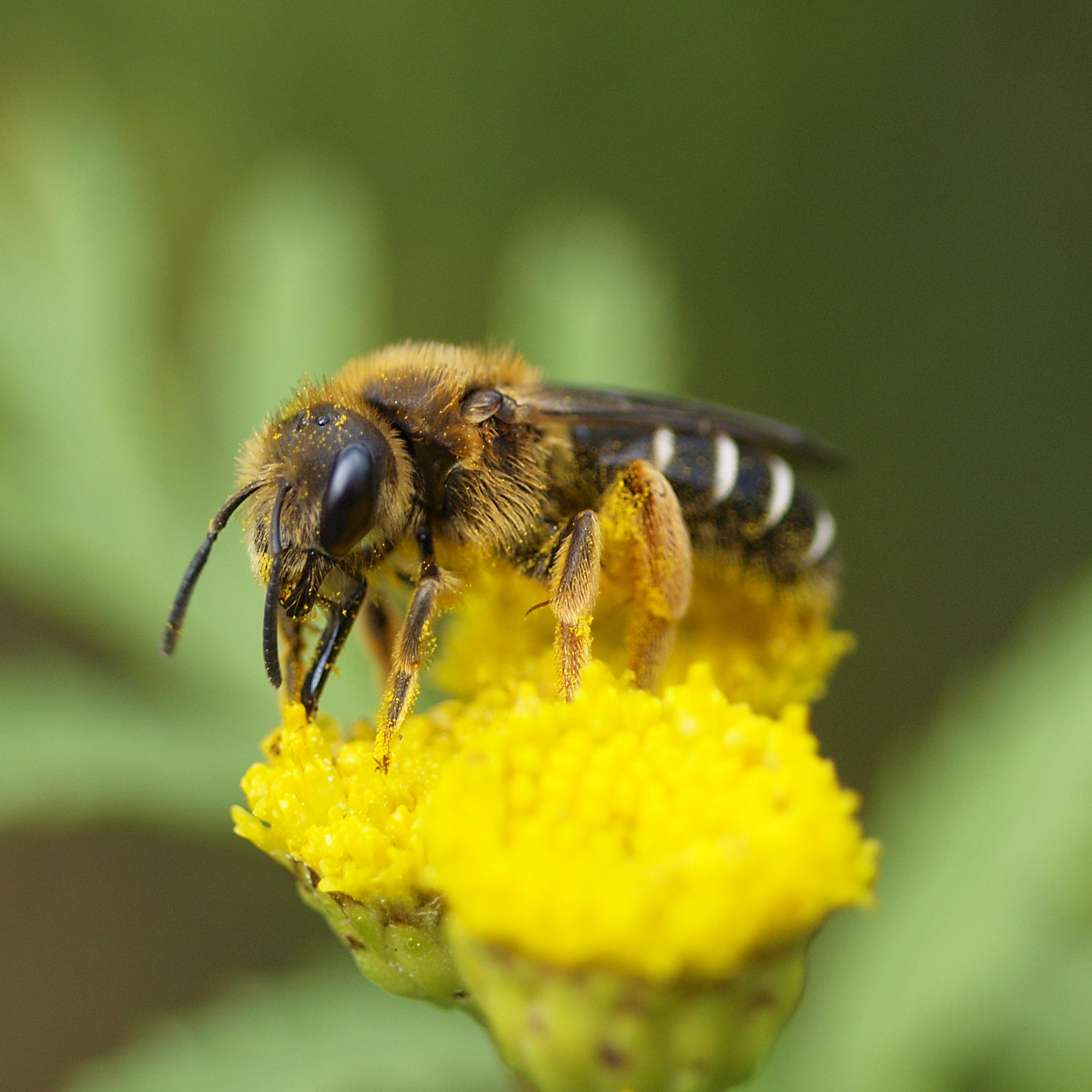
- Female H. rubicundus

Scientific classification
- Kingdom: Animalia
- Phylum: Arthropoda
- Clade: Pancrustacea
- Class: Insecta
- Order: Hymenoptera
- Family: Halictidae
- Genus: Halictus
- Species: H. rubicundus

Binomial name
- Halictus rubicundus (Christ, 1791)

= Halictus rubicundus =

Species of bee

Halictus rubicundus, the orange-legged furrow bee, is a species of sweat bee found throughout the Northern Hemisphere. H. rubicundus entered North America from the Old World during one of two main invasions of Halictus subgenera. These invasions likely occurred via the Bering land bridge at times of low sea level during the Pleistocene epoch.

The species exhibits different social behaviors depending on climate: it is a solitary species in high elevations or latitudes where the season is short, but eusocial in other areas. Often, solitary and eusocial colonies appear simultaneously in the same population. These sweat bees are extensively studied for their variability in social behavior, which has become a model for social plasticity. This variability has contributed to an understanding of evolution of social behavior.

== Taxonomy and phylogeny ==
Halictus rubicundus is a species of Hymenoptera in the bee family Halictidae, more commonly known as sweat bees. This common name comes from their frequent attraction to perspiration. This species exhibits polymorphic social behavior that varies with environmental conditions, and other species of the family Halictidae are thought to have similar variability in sociality.

== Description and identification ==
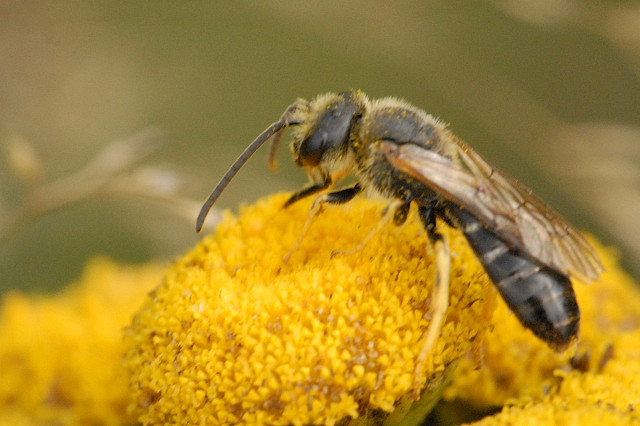
A male on a flower

Many members of the family Halictidae are metallic in appearance but Halictus rubicundus are not metallic. Females are about 1 cm in body length and brown in color, with fine white bands across the apices of the abdominal segments, and rusty-orange legs. The males are more slender, with longer antennae and yellow markings on the face and legs; they can be distinguished from males of similar species by the absence of an apical hair band on the terminal abdominal segment. In social populations, females of the first brood, mostly workers, can be recognized because they are typically slightly smaller than the foundresses.

== Distribution and habitat ==
H. rubicundus has one of the widest natural distributions of any bee species, occurring throughout the temperate regions of the Holarctic region. It is believed that differences in climate across this vast range actually contribute to variation in their social behavior. Those living in more northern geographic locations or higher elevations are often more solitary in behavior than those in southern areas or lower elevations. This difference is widely studied, as it provides insight into the evolutionary transition from solitary to social behavior. Nests are haplometrotic, meaning that they are founded by single females. Social populations typically are found in warmer regions, such as Kansas, while solitary populations nest in cooler regions, such as Colorado, Scotland and Alaska. In intermediate regions, such as New York and southern Ontario, both social and solitary behavior can be found in different nests of the same population. The strictly solitary phenotype is expressed as a response to colder environments because the active season is not long enough to produce two broods.

== Nesting ==
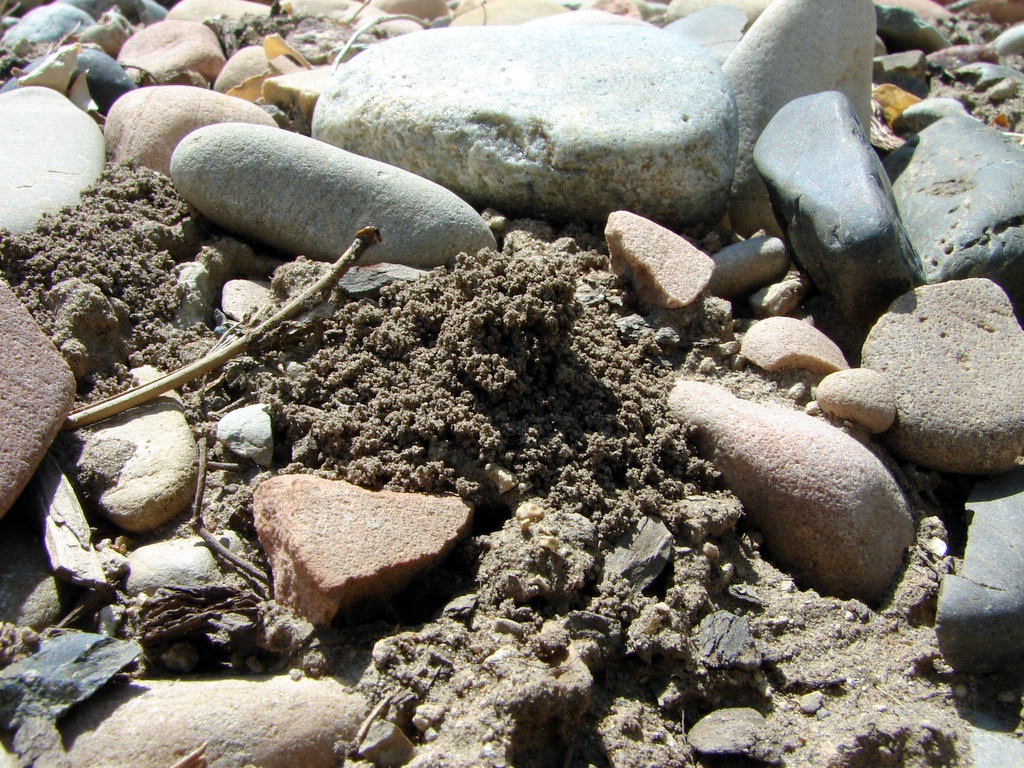
H. rubicundus burrow with tumulus among pebbles

Both solitary and eusocial types of the species typically excavate nest burrows in southward facing slopes in isolated areas, consisting of sand or soil. This slope maximizes the heat absorption from the sun, making the nest warmer. The nests with a favorable slope were thought to increase foraging efficiency of adults and development of larvae with a stable thermal environment.

Stones or areas of vegetation are usually found near nest entrances, likely because of the heating properties of these objects. For each offspring, a female constructs a small underground chamber (a "brood cell"), into which she deposits several loads of pollen mixed with nectar, which is then formed into a ball; a single egg is laid upon this pollen mass, and then the brood cell is sealed. The female repeats the process with other brood cells, going progressively deeper into the soil, producing a tumulus around the nest entrance. A higher temperature increases the rate at which the larvae develop to maturity, as thermal regulation is important for the development of both the eggs and the larvae.

The nests can be up to 120 mm deep, and are constructed in a wide range of soil types. Because social nests produce more offspring than solitary nests, social nests will burrow further into the ground, as the second brood of the social population will extend the burrows downward. Females typically nest in dense aggregations, likely because the nesting females are relatives and demonstrate philopatric behavior.

=== Soil hardness ===
The nests are typically burrowed into the ground in loam soil. Halictus rubicundus has a high tolerance for soil hardness. Soil hardness affects the density of nesting. Females prefer to nest in softer ground as they spend less energy and time excavating the nest. Unlike the similar species Lasioglossum zephyrus that build nests in very close proximity to each other, this species prefers less dense aggregations. Foundresses will choose to build their nests in patches of softer ground until they reach the critical nearest-neighbor distance of about 50 mm, at which point the close spacing poses a high risk of the nests collapsing. At this point, further foundresses would be forced to build their nests in harder soils where the nests could be built closer together without compromising nest architecture. Foundresses may test the hardness of the soil by biting into the surface or performing a short test dig.

=== Temperature ===
Nest temperature determines egg development and foraging active time of females. As long as temperatures do not reach lethal thresholds, developmental rates of offspring will increase with temperature. Higher temperatures will also increase the thoracic temperature and allow females to fly more rapidly. With increased speed in flight, females are allowed more time for foraging, mating, and excavating nests.

Most nests of H. rubicundus are south facing and sloped because of this desire for increased temperature in nesting sites. Based on the distribution of this species, facing the south maximizes the period of time sunlight is shining directly on the nest. Sloping substrates increase the surface area of the nest and allow for higher absorption of sunlight. In order to test the temperature of the substrate, females often spend several seconds basking at various points on the ground while searching for nesting sites.

=== Soil water content ===
The water content of the substrate in which foundresses build the nest is important, as waterlogging must be avoided by using well-drained soils, which provides another advantage to building in sloping ground. However, there must be an adequate moisture level to prevent desiccation of the brood cells. Soil samples taken near the nests of H. rubicundus demonstrate a relatively high humidity.

=== Parasites ===
Halictus rubicundus nests are attacked by kleptoparasitic bees (e.g., Sphecodes), as well as flies (Bombyliidae, Anthomyiidae). Although it would seem as though nesting in dense groups would draw attention to aggregations and increase mortality by parasitism, such is not observed to be the case; because the sweat bees nest densely, it is assumed that there is a large dilution effect that proportionally decreases mortality rates by parasites.

== Colony cycle and demographics ==
H. rubicundus’s annual colony cycle is dependent both on hibernation and mating schedules. After hibernation during the winter, female foundresses who mated the previous cycle emerge in the spring. They each create their own nests in late spring, where they rear a single brood. Females are more likely to build nests where there is a warmer surface temperature, as this indicates a warmer interior of the nest for the offspring to develop more quickly. The foundress gynes will continue to forage for 3–5 weeks, after which they will stop constructing and provisioning brood cells. The brood cells are left inactive for 1–2 weeks before the emergence of the first brood. The first brood typically emerges in June, and most females from the first brood will stay with their natal nest and act as foraging workers, provisioning for a second brood, on which the foundresses will resume laying eggs.

Some females (the gynes) from the first brood, and all of the females from the second brood, will mate, disperse, and enter hibernation for the winter, and the colony cycle begins again the following spring.

=== Sociality effects on colony cycle ===
The annual cycle differs slightly for eusocial and solitary populations, in terms of the number and sex ratios of offspring born in the broods. For example, in solitary populations, the first brood comprises 40% females, who all mate and enter hibernation. However, in eusocial populations, the emergence from hibernation occurs one or two months earlier, and results in a brood with mostly or exclusively worker females, with the female bias being greater the earlier nesting begins. Nesting for solitary populations begins in late May or June. The absence of a brood of female workers defines this nest type as solitary, so solitary populations produce only one reproductive brood that is provisioned by a gyne. The emergence of this brood is at approximately the same time as the emergence of the second or third brood in the social colony cycle. Upon emergence, the offspring mate and then females enter hibernation away from the nesting site. As in social colonies, the males and nest foundresses die at the end of the season.

=== Sex ratio variation ===
In social populations where there are two or more broods in one season, there are different sex ratios for each brood., and even variation between years, depending upon temperature (warmer years lead to increased male bias). The first brood will typically contain 75–100% females, most of which become workers, to help the mother produce a second brood. The final brood is slightly male-biased, typically with a sex ratio of about 60% males, and the females of the second brood are all gynes. The peak of male production strongly corresponds with photoperiod, such that eggs laid on or near the summer solstice are almost all male. In solitary populations, nesting begins later and only one brood is produced. The brood has a sex ratio made up of 60% males, similar to that of the final brood in social populations. This brood is also produced at about the same time that the final brood is produced in social populations so that the colony cycle ends at about the same time regardless of where the population lives.

=== Body size ===
Temperature affects not only the sex ratio, but also the size of offspring in the first brood of Halictus rubicundus, with warmer temperatures strongly correlated with larger offspring; there are various hypotheses that offer explanations as to why such is the case:

- At optimum temperatures, the maximum offspring size will be produced. Smaller sizes will be the result of both higher and lower temperatures based on differing stresses. So varying conditions around one optimum temperature will lead to different offspring sizes. This hypothesis is not supported by existing data.
- Low temperatures may reduce flowering, or reduce bees' ability to forage during the day, and therefore effect the rate of cell provisioning. If the rate of provisioning is lower, females may lay eggs on pollen masses before the mass reaches an optimal size. This hypothesis is supported by existing data.

An offspring's size is not correlated with the size of their mother; foundress females that are smaller than the population average produce offspring that are larger than they are, and foundress females that are above the population average produce offspring that are smaller than they are. Once a nest contains workers, the size of offspring ceases to correlate with temperature, and instead correlates very strongly with the number of workers foraging for pollen, with the largest offspring (both males and females) being produced in nests with the greatest numbers of foragers.

== Behavior ==
Halictus rubicundus is widely studied for their variability in behavior depending on geographic location, and with changes in temperature. Those at low elevations are known to exhibit eusocial behavior, while those at high elevations and latitudes are known to be solitary.

=== Dominance hierarchy ===
There is a caste system in H. rubicundus. The nest-founding females recruit their early-emerging daughters as workers, but later-emerging offspring mate prior to dispersal and hibernation. These behavioral categories are not thought to be genetically predetermined, but determined instead by mating behaviors and social factors in the first few days of adulthood. In this hierarchy, there is a foundress, which is a gyne that is always mated and starts her own colony after hibernation each cycle. She is considered the foundress queen if she is the one that established the nest, and recruits her daughters to act as workers. A gyne is any female that enters diapause, with the potential to become a nest foundress the following season. Below that is a non-gyne, which is a female who stays in an existing colony and may or may not reproduce. Within these non-gynes, there are some that are considered replacement queens, if they take the place of a dead foundress queen in the colony, but the majority are workers, who forage and maintain the colony. Replacement queens and workers appear to produce mostly male eggs, when they reproduce. Neither replacement queens nor workers enter hibernation, and die at the end of the season.

=== Division of labor ===
In eusocial colonies, there is a division of labor similar to that in other eusocial bees. In these colonies in New York, the first brood is primarily worker females, which in turn help the foundress rear her second brood, and a number of gynes and males. The second brood in New York yields only gynes and males, which breed to repeat the cycle. In Kansas, the first brood is exclusively worker females, and it is not until the second brood that gynes and males begin to appear, while the third brood is exclusively gynes and males. However, in non-eusocial nests within the New York populations, or at high elevation in Colorado, the brood contains only males and gynes. The cooperative breeding behavior of worker bees in eusocial colonies benefits the fitness of the foundress queen. However, in solitary nests, the offspring do not serve as workers and do not help the mother establish a second brood, but rather go off to try to establish nests of their own the following season.

There is no evidence for predetermined morphological or physiological differences in caste for H. rubicundus. The differentiation into different castes is based on behavior. Females that do not mate immediately after emergence become workers or replacement queens while the others become gynes. The factor that may dictate whether a female mates is the relative abundance of males to newly emerged females; there is a higher percentage of gynes relative to non-gynes when males are relatively more abundant. This has population-level consequences in that during seasons where males are more abundant, a smaller proportion of nests contain eusocial colonies, and the average number of workers per nest is lower.

=== Mating behavior ===
Like most bee species, mating in H. rubicundus occurs on the ground or vegetation in and around the nest aggregation. Males may hover around their natal nest and wait to encounter females that are entering or leaving a surrounding nest. Gynes are those females that leave the nest site after mating and enter a dormant state (diapause), and restart the cycle the following spring, while worker females, if they mate, remain in the natal nest.

In this species, there are foundress gynes and non-gynes (who can be replacement queens or workers). The gynes and non-gynes are distinct groups, as gynes mate, do not work, and enter diapause (to become foundresses), while non-gynes work and do not diapause. There is evidence that male abundance may be the factor triggering this distinction early in life; if there is an abundance of males, a virgin female is more likely to encounter males and mate early shortly after emergence, and make a caste switch into being a gyne. If she is left unmated for two or three days, however, she will likely stay a non-gyne, even if she mates later on; no female who began acting as a worker (pollen-collecting behavior, typically starting within two or three days after emergence) was ever found to return the following season. Halictus rubicundus is the first bee species documented to have mixed broods containing both gynes and non-gynes, and it was previously thought that non-gynes and gynes were always produced in separate broods.

=== Sex ratio effects on sociality ===
Male abundance appears to have a major effect on deciding the social behavior within a population; the best predictor for a female's fate (future foundress gyne versus worker non-gyne) is the relative male abundance in proportion to virgin females on the first day a given virgin female emerges as an adult (i.e., if there are 10 males and 10 virgin females on one day, each female has a 50% chance of becoming a gyne, but if the following day there are 15 males and only 5 virgin females, then 75% of those females will become gynes). Warmer temperatures during the first brood provisioning phase in the spring leads to a higher ratio of male to female offspring, and a significantly lower proportion of females are recruited as workers, reducing the overall level of sociality expressed in that population, ranging from above 75% in some years to below 45% in others, in the same location. Sex ratio is also affected by photoperiod at the time of egg production, with eggs laid on or near the summer solstice being almost exclusively male, so the earlier the season starts, the more female-biased the early brood phase will be, as in Kansas, where there are no males produced at all in the first brood, and there are three broods annually.

=== Nest-site fidelity ===
Nest-site fidelity may be due to one of three reasons, or a combination:

1. Philopatry is the tendency for adult bees to excavate a nest near their natal nest; in H. rubicundus, females returning from overwintering sites typically excavate burrows within 30 cm of the location of their natal nest. Returning to the vicinity of the natal nest is beneficial because the site must have been successful enough to produce adults for one year. This prevents H. rubicundus from taking the risk of settling in a poor location for brood rearing.
2. Habitat learning describes the process through which females recognize characteristics of the site from which she emerged and chooses to nest in similar conditions. Although this is different from philopatry in that she will not purposely choose to be near her previous nest and will make selections based on environmental cues, the nest the female chooses may still be near her original nest when the number of favorable nest sites is limited.
3. Social facilitation may influence the nesting location chosen by a female because the benefits of nesting close to other bees may outweigh the costs of finding a new location with a suitable substrate.

In H. rubicundus, females fly back, after 10 months in diapause at remote locations, to within centimeters of the nest they emerged from, even though the nesting area used by the population is many square meters, suggesting the first of these mechanisms is of primary importance (i.e., within the nesting area as a whole, only a model of strict philopatry predicts a non-random distribution of females within that larger area, and the observed distribution is extremely non-random).

=== Gregarious nesting ===
Dense nesting tendencies of H. rubicundus are most likely due to the following three factors:

1. There is a limited amount of suitable substrate in which the bees can build their nests, so they must build many nests packed tightly together without compromising the structural integrity of the nest.
2. As mentioned earlier, philopatry is an important factor in maintaining an aggregation. The search for a new nesting site requires a lot of resources, so females will likely limit their dispersal and stay near their natal nest sites.
3. Hymenopteran and dipteran species may attack the ground nests of H. rubicundus. Although it would seem that aggregation of nests would increase mortality due to parasitism (as the sites would be more conspicuous), it is likely that there is a dilution effect that reduces mortality by parasitism.

=== Pheromone recognition ===
Halictid bees have a gland known as the Dufour’s gland that extends throughout the abdomen. It is found primarily in female Hymenoptera. The Dufour’s gland, which is associated with the sting structure, secretes fluids that are important for socioecological functioning. In H. rubicundus, the Dufour’s gland produces pheromones that may aid females in recognizing brood cells as well as other individuals in the nest.

== Kin selection ==
=== Genetic relatedness within colonies ===
Following standard models, it is assumed that worker bees who help their mother raise the following brood are in a position to benefit from the effects of kin selection. Females within the first brood therefore that stays in the colony, and are directly genetically related to their mother by half, are able to help to raise a second brood containing sisters, which are also (due to haplodipoidy) related to them by half.

=== Genetic relatedness among colonies of different behaviors ===
There is evidence for greater genetic relatedness between two colonies with similar behavioral patterns (either eusocial or solitary), than between those of closer geographic distance but different social behaviors. This does not necessarily mean that social behavior is governed by certain genes, but it could be linked to certain genetic lineages that are more suited for certain environments. Empirical data from within a single population, however, indicates that females who do not remain as workers in their mother's nest are not more likely to have daughters that similarly depart. Although there is only limited research to date on the correlation between genetics, the environment, and social behavior, there is ample evidence that there are links between these three factors. The differences between the populations of H. rubicundus exhibiting solitary behavior, and those exhibiting eusocial behavior could be the result of environmental control of sociality, rather than having a purely genetic explanation.

=== Costs and benefits of sociality ===
In environments with short breeding seasons, sociality is not expected because there is no benefit to acting as a worker in the absence of an opportunity to produce another brood that season, and no potential for kinship selection benefits. Populations in environments that allow for multiple broods exhibit eusocial behavior, and there are potential benefits to worker behavior in eusocial colonies, as workers are related to the foundress (their mother) and the brood (their sisters, in particular). Under theories of inclusive fitness, it is potentially beneficial for workers to help their mother produce a second brood if that brood is primarily female. However, H. rubicundus does not show female bias in the second brood, with values only ranging to a maximum of 40% female. Furthermore, the one study providing empirical data for H. rubicundus shows that a typical worker contributes to the production of 0.9 sisters and 0.8 brothers, far below the threshold for inclusive fitness effects to favor helping, but above the threshold at which their mother benefits directly; as such, this species provides evidence that kin selection effects would not apply to this species, and instead suggests that mothers manipulate some of their daughters into acting as workers because of direct gains to maternal fitness, even though these manipulated daughters have lower fitness than they could have had if they had been gynes.
