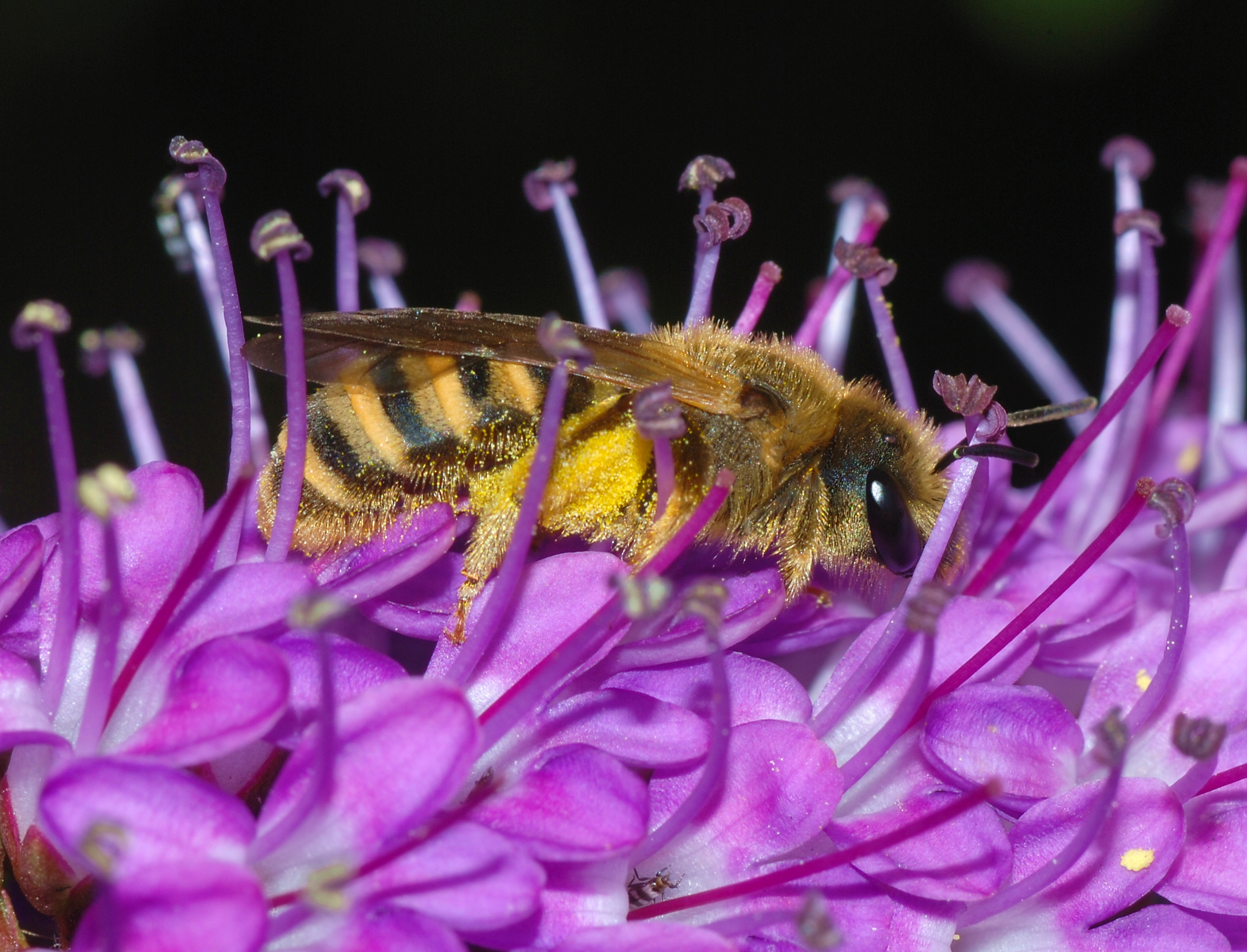
- Halictus scabiosae, female

Scientific classification
- Kingdom: Animalia
- Phylum: Arthropoda
- Class: Insecta
- Order: Hymenoptera
- Family: Halictidae
- Subfamily: Halictinae
- Tribe: Halictini
- Genus: Halictus; Latreille, 1804

Species
- >330 species in 15 subgenera (see text)

= Halictus =

Genus of bees

The genus Halictus is a large assemblage of bee species in the family Halictidae. The genus is divided into 15 subgenera, some of dubious monophyly, containing over 200 species, primarily in the Northern Hemisphere (a few species occur in South America, Asia and Africa). Most species are black or dark brown, sometimes metallic greenish-tinted, with apical whitish abdominal bands on the terga (the related genus Lasioglossum, which is otherwise often similar in appearance, has the abdominal hair bands located basally, not apically).

Many species in the genus are eusocial, with colony sizes ranging from very small (two to four bees) to large (>200). Nests are typically burrows in the soil, with several ovoid "cells" in which pollen mixed with nectar is provided as food for the developing larvae; a single egg is laid on a pollen mass, and the cell is sealed. In a few species, the cells are arranged in clusters resembling a honeycomb, but constructed of soil rather than beeswax. Like most ground-nesting bees, the brood cells are lined internally with a waterproofing secretion.

A few species in the genus have extensive geographic distribution, such as Halictus rubicundus, which spans virtually the entire Holarctic region. Previously, Halictus ligatus was considered to range from Canada to Venezuela, including the Caribbean. However, genetic data show that there are at least three species previously considered within this one. One of them is restricted to Southeastern USA and the Caribbean, one is Central American, and true H. ligatus is found in northern and western North America. Common European species include Halictus quadricinctus and Halictus sexcinctus, as well as H. rubicundus. H. rubicundus is solitary at high altitudes and latitudes but has eusocial colonies in warmer areas.

== Species ==
Species within this genus include:

- Halictus acrocephalus Blüthgen, 1926
- Halictus adjikenticus Blüthgen, 1923
- Halictus aegypticola Strand, 1909
- Halictus aeneobrunneus Pérez, 1895
- Halictus aerarius Smith, 1873
- Halictus aestuans Ebmer, 1978
- Halictus albozonatus Dours, 1872
- Halictus alfkenellus Strand, 1909
- Halictus argilos Ebmer, 2005
- Halictus asperatus Bingham, 1898
- Halictus asperulus Pérez, 1895
- Halictus atripes Morawitz, 1893
- Halictus atroviridis Cameron, 1906
- Halictus bagirensis Blüthgen, 1936
- Halictus balearicus Pérez, 1903
- Halictus berlandi Blüthgen, 1936
- Halictus beytueschebapensis Warncke, 1984
- Halictus brunnescens (Eversmann, 1852)
- Halictus bucharicus Blüthgen, 1936
- Halictus bulbiceps Blüthgen, 1929
- Halictus caelestis Ebmer, 1976
- Halictus carinthiacus Blüthgen, 1936
- Halictus centaureae Ebmer, 1985
- Halictus centrosus Vachal, 1910
- Halictus cephalicus Morawitz, 1873
- Halictus chalybaeus Friese, 1910
- Halictus clangulus Warncke, 1984
- Halictus cochlearitarsis Dours, 1872
- Halictus compressus (Walckenaer, 1802)
- Halictus concinnus Brullé, 1840
- Halictus confusus Smith, 1853
- Halictus consobrinus Pérez, 1895
- Halictus constantinensis Strand, 1910
- Halictus constrictus Smith, 1853
- Halictus crenicornis Blüthgen, 1923
- Halictus cupidus Vachal, 1902
- Halictus cyanellus (Pauly, 2008)
- Halictus cypricus Blüthgen, 1937
- Halictus cyrenaicus Blüthgen, 1930
- Halictus desertorum Morawitz, 1876
- Halictus determinandus Dalla Torre, 1896
- Halictus diductus Cockerell, 1932
- Halictus dissidens Pérez, 1903
- Halictus dorni Ebmer, 1982
- Halictus dschulfensis Blüthgen, 1936
- Halictus duplocinctus Vachal, 1902
- Halictus expertus Cockerell, 1916
- Halictus falcinellus Warncke, 1982
- Halictus farinosus Smith, 1853
- Halictus fatsensis Blüthgen, 1936
- Halictus ferreotus Fan, 1991
- Halictus fimbriatus Smith, 1853
- Halictus foanus Vachal, 1899
- Halictus frontalis Smith, 1853
- Halictus fulvipes (Klug, 1817)
- Halictus fumatipennis Blüthgen, 1923
- Halictus funerarius Morawitz, 1876
- Halictus fuscicollis Morawitz, 1876
- Halictus gavarnicus Pérez, 1903
- Halictus gemmeus Dours, 1872
- Halictus georgicus Blüthgen, 1936
- Halictus gobiensis Ebmer, 1982
- Halictus gordius Warncke, 1975
- Halictus graecus Blüthgen, 1933
- Halictus grossellus Ebmer, 1978
- Halictus gruenwaldti Ebmer, 1975
- Halictus harmonius Sandhouse, 1941
- Halictus hedini Blüthgen, 1934
- Halictus hermon Ebmer, 1975
- Halictus hesperus Smith, 1862
- Halictus holomelaenus Blüthgen, 1936
- Halictus hotoni Vachal, 1903
- Halictus humkalensis Blüthgen, 1936
- Halictus icarus Ebmer, 1978
- Halictus indefinitus Blüthgen, 1923
- Halictus inpilosus Ebmer, 1975
- Halictus intumescens Pérez, 1895
- Halictus iridicolor Cameron, 1905
- Halictus jaramielicus Blüthgen, 1923
- Halictus jucundus Smith, 1853
- Halictus kessleri Bramson, 1879
- Halictus kuhlmanni (Pauly, 2008)
- Halictus kuschkensis Ebmer, 1975
- Halictus kusdasi Ebmer, 1975
- Halictus lanei (Moure, 1940)
- Halictus langobardicus Blüthgen, 1944
- Halictus laticephalus Warncke, 1984
- Halictus latisignatus Cameron, 1908
- Halictus leleji (Pesenko, 2006)
- Halictus leucaheneus Ebmer, 1972
- Halictus ligatus Say, 1837
- Halictus lobatus Ebmer, 1978
- Halictus lucidipennis Smith, 1853
- Halictus luganicus Blüthgen, 1936
- Halictus lussinicus Blüthgen, 1936
- Halictus lutescens Friese, 1921
- Halictus maculatus Smith, 1848
- Halictus magnus Ebmer, 1980
- Halictus mediterranellus Strand, 1909
- Halictus microcardia Pérez, 1896
- Halictus minor Morawitz, 1876
- Halictus modernus Morawitz, 1876
- Halictus mogrensis Cockerell, 1945
- Halictus mondaensis Blüthgen, 1923
- Halictus mongolicus Morawitz, 1880
- Halictus monochromus Dalla Torre, 1896
- Halictus morawitzi Vachal, 1902
- Halictus mordacella Blüthgen, 1929
- Halictus mordax Blüthgen, 1923
- Halictus mucidus Blüthgen, 1923
- Halictus mucoreus Eversmann, 1852
- Halictus mugodjaricus Blüthgen, 1933
- Halictus multicarinatus Niu, Wu & Huang, 2004
- Halictus nadigi Blüthgen, 1934
- Halictus nasica Morawitz, 1876
- Halictus nicosiae Blüthgen, 1923
- Halictus nigricutis Warncke, 1975
- Halictus nikolskayae (Pesenko, 2006)
- Halictus nivalis Ebmer, 1985
- Halictus niveocinctulus Cockerell, 1940
- Halictus nuristanicus Pesenko, 2005
- Halictus ochropus Blüthgen, 1923
- Halictus opacoviridis Ebmer, 2005
- Halictus opulentus Benoist, 1950
- Halictus orientalis Lepeletier, 1841
- Halictus palustris Morawitz, 1876
- Halictus parallelus Say, 1837
- Halictus paropamisos Ebmer, 1978
- Halictus patellatus Morawitz, 1873
- Halictus pentheri Blüthgen, 1923
- Halictus persephone Ebmer, 1976
- Halictus petraeus Blüthgen, 1933
- Halictus pici Pérez, 1895
- Halictus pinguismentus Janjic & Packer, 2001
- Halictus pjalmensis Strand, 1909
- Halictus placidulus Blüthgen, 1923
- Halictus poeyi Lepeletier, 1841
- Halictus pollinosus Sichel, 1860
- Halictus ponticus Blüthgen, 1934
- Halictus propinquus Smith, 1853
- Halictus pruinescens Cockerell, 1937
- Halictus pseudomucoreus Ebmer, 1975
- Halictus pseudotetrazonius Strand, 1921
- Halictus pseudovestitus Blüthgen, 1925
- Halictus pulvereus Morawitz, 1874
- Halictus pyrenaeus Pérez, 1903
- Halictus quadricinctoides Blüthgen, 1936
- Halictus quadricinctus (Fabricius, 1776)
- Halictus quadripartitus Blüthgen, 1923
- Halictus radoszkowskii Vachal, 1902
- Halictus resurgens Nurse, 1903
- Halictus rossicus Ebmer, 1978
- Halictus rubicundus (Christ, 1791)
- Halictus rudolphae Pesenko, 1984
- Halictus rufipes (Fabricius, 1793)
- Halictus sajoi Blüthgen, 1923
- Halictus scabiosae (Rossi, 1790)
- Halictus secundus Dalla Torre, 1896
- Halictus seladonius (Fabricius, 1794)
- Halictus semitectus Morawitz, 1874
- Halictus semiticus Blüthgen, 1955
- Halictus senilis (Eversmann, 1852)
- Halictus sexcinctus (Fabricius, 1775)
- Halictus simplex Blüthgen, 1923
- Halictus smaragdulus Vachal, 1895
- Halictus solitudinis Ebmer, 1975
- Halictus squamosus Lebedev, 1910
- Halictus stachii Blüthgen, 1923
- Halictus subauratoides Blüthgen, 1926
- Halictus subauratus (Rossi, 1792)
- Halictus submodernus Blüthgen, 1936
- Halictus subpetraeus Blüthgen, 1933
- Halictus subsenilis Blüthgen, 1955
- Halictus surabadensis Ebmer, 1975
- Halictus takuiricus Blüthgen, 1936
- Halictus tectus Radoszkowski, 1875
- Halictus tetrazonianellus Strand, 1909
- Halictus tetrazonius (Klug, 1817)
- Halictus tibetanus Blüthgen, 1926
- Halictus tibialis Walker, 1871
- Halictus togoensis Pauly, 1998
- Halictus transbaikalensis Blüthgen, 1933
- Halictus tridivisus Blüthgen, 1923
- Halictus tripartitus Cockerell, 1895
- Halictus tsingtouensis Strand, 1910
- Halictus tuberculatus Blüthgen, 1925
- Halictus tumulorum (Linnaeus, 1758)
- Halictus turanicus Morawitz, 1893
- Halictus turkmenorum Pesenko, 1984
- Halictus vansoni Cockerell, 1935
- Halictus varentzowi Morawitz, 1894
- Halictus verticalis Blüthgen, 1931
- Halictus vestitus Lepeletier, 1841
- Halictus vicinus Vachal, 1894
- Halictus virgatellus Cockerell, 1901
- Halictus wjernicus Blüthgen, 1936
- Halictus wollmanni Blüthgen, 1933
- Halictus xanthoprymnus Warncke, 1984
- Halictus yunnanicus Pesenko & Wu, 1997
