= Polylecty =

Term in pollination ecology

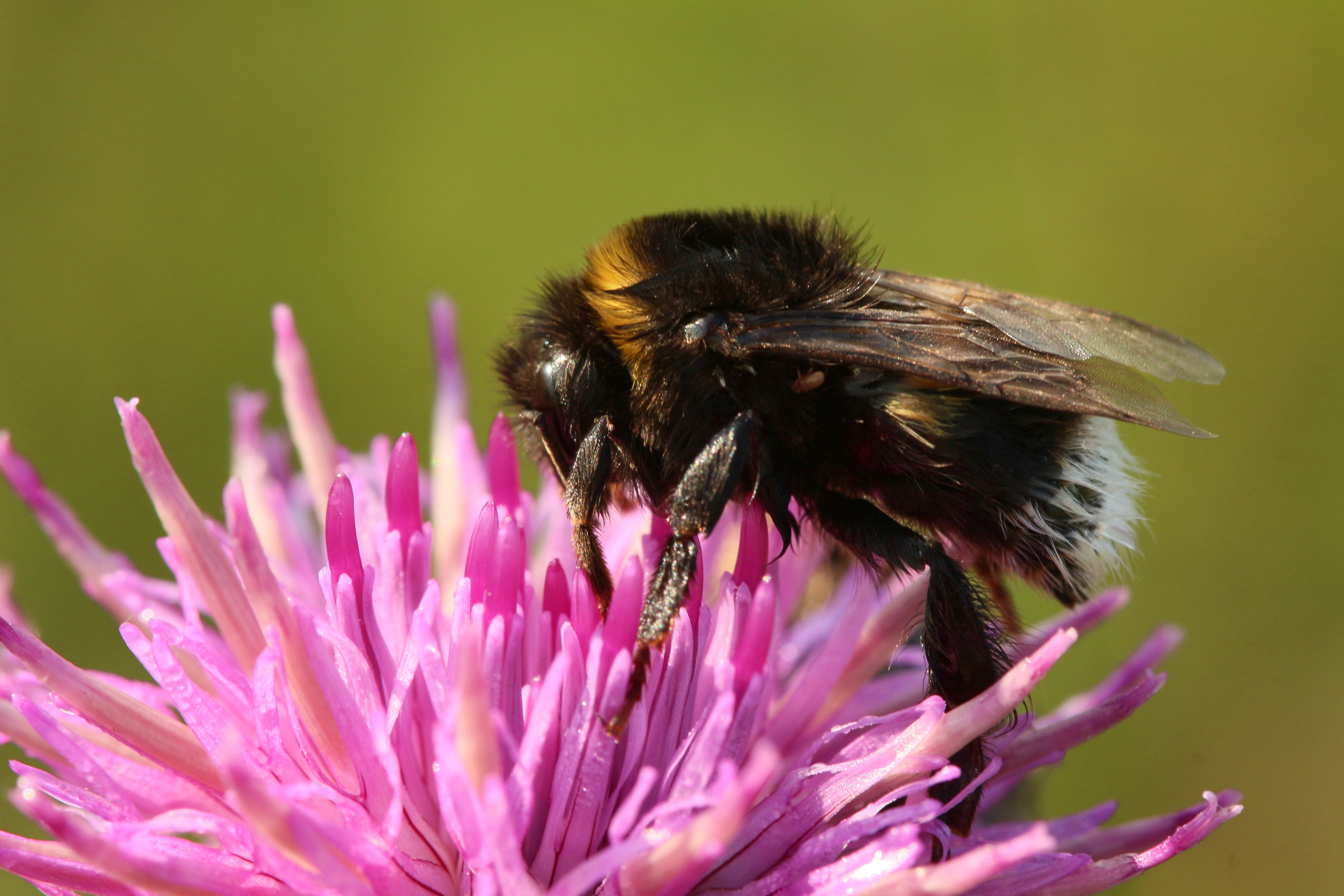
Bombus terrestris, an opportunistic generalist, collecting pollen

The term polylecty or generalist is used in pollination ecology to refer to bees that collect pollen from a range of unrelated plants. Honey bees exemplify this behavior, collecting nectar from a wide array of flowers. Other predominantly polylectic genera include Bombus, Ceratina, Heriades and Halictus. The opposite term is oligolecty, and refers to bees that exhibit a narrow, specialized preference for pollen sources, typically to a single family or genus of flowering plants.

Roughly two-thirds of bee species in Europe are polylectic, relying on a diverse array of pollen sources. This broad foraging approach allows these generalist bees to thrive in various environments and quickly adjust to shifting conditions. However, despite their adaptability, they are less efficient pollen gatherers than oligolectic bees, whose morphology are often specialized for more effective pollen collection from a narrower range of plants.

A species that exhibits polylecty is known as polylectic. This term should not be confused with Polylectic as a grammatical term, which has a similar etymology to the biological definition but instead refers to the adjective of a multi-word term, as opposed to a monolectic which is the adjective for a one-word term.
