= Tumulus (biology) =

Mound of soil surrounding nest entrances of bees and wasps

In biology, a tumulus (pl.: tumuli) is a small mound of earth surrounding the entrance of the nest of fossorial (ground-nesting) ants, bees, or wasps. In the case of ants, this mound is almost universally referred to as an "anthill" (or "ant hill"); the worker ants typically pile sand or soil outside the entrance to the nest in the process of excavation. In the case of bees and wasps, there is no corresponding common term, and such mounds are referred to as "tumuli" (e.g.).

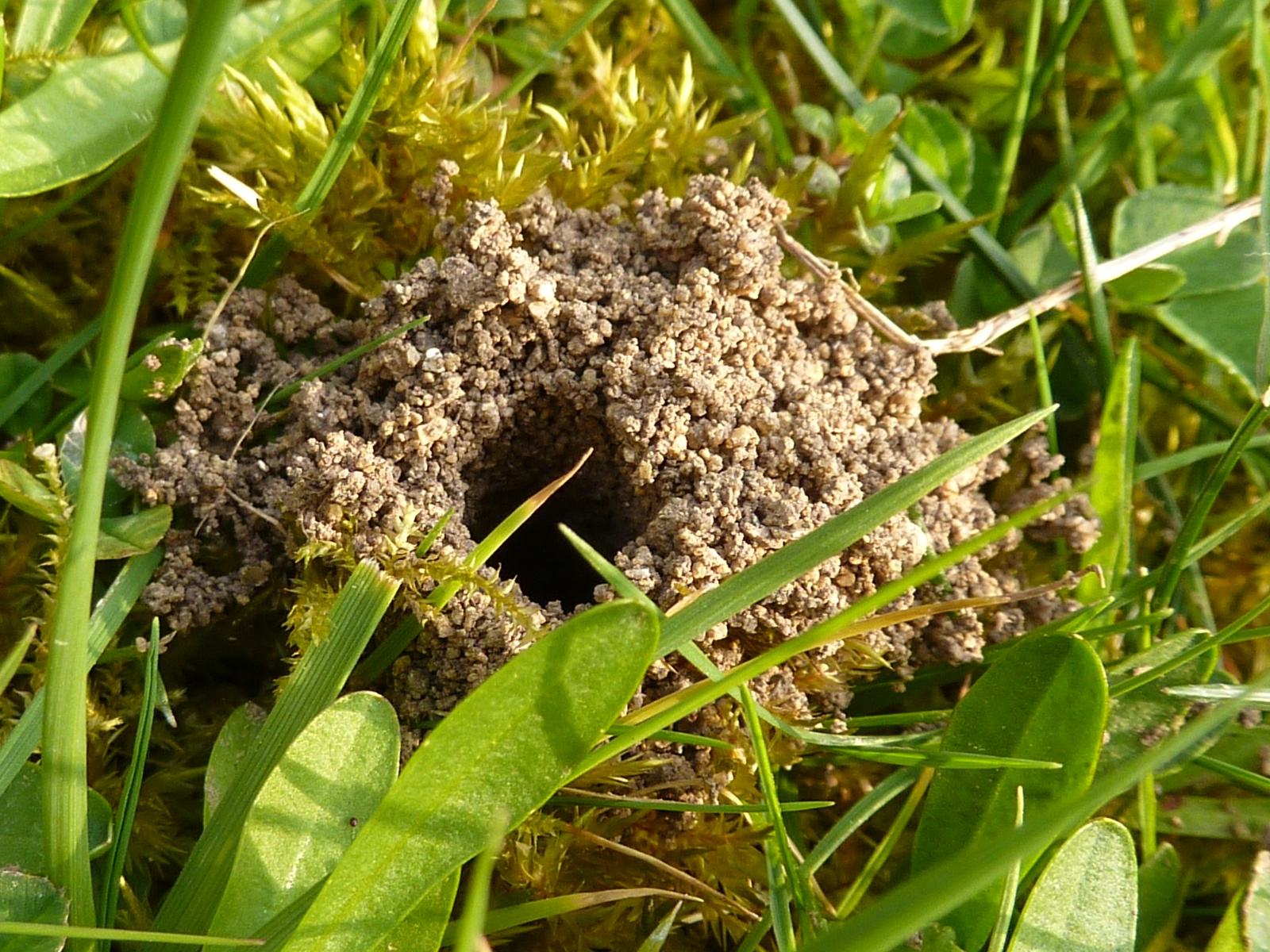
The poorly-defined tumulus of a nest of Andrena fulva, a mining bee

The tumulus is typically symmetrical or nearly so, a simple accumulation of excavated material, though there are occasional examples where the mound is skewed towards one side, with the entrance therefore not in the middle of the mound. If the material is loose, it may be blown away by wind or washed away by rain, but as nest excavation generally is continuous over the course of a season, the tumulus is usually re-formed fairly rapidly.
