= Meliponiculture =

Rational keeping and farming of stingless bees

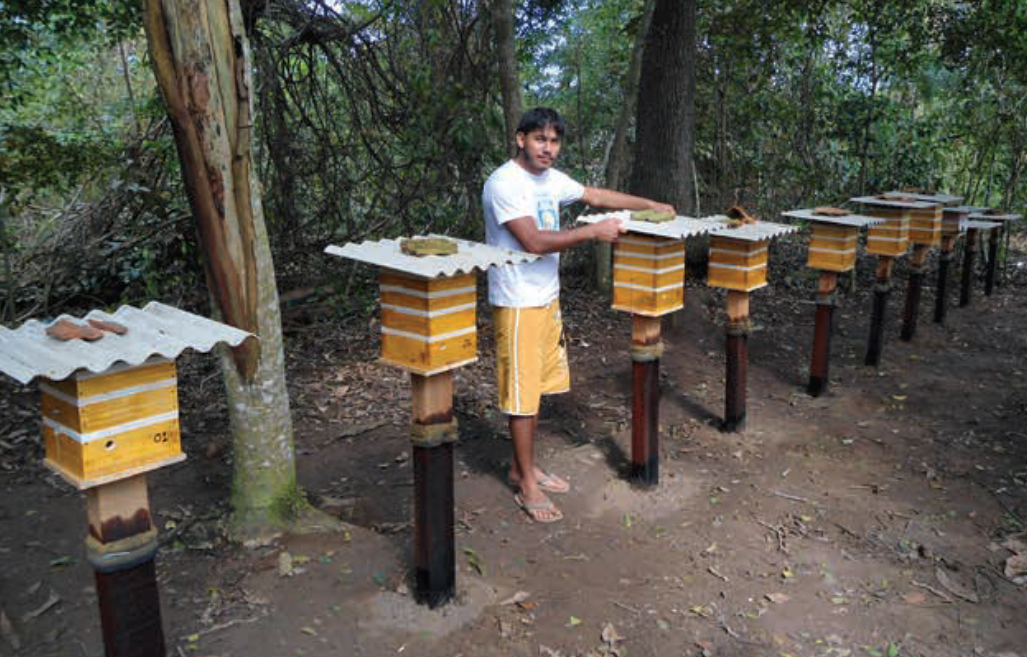
Meliponary with individual posts in the Pau Brasil village, in the Tupiniquim Indigenous Land, Aracruz, Espírito Santo

Meliponiculture is the rational farming of stingless bees, or meliponines (Meliponini tribe), which is different from apiculture (the breeding of bees of the Apis mellifera species; western honey bee or European honey bee; Apini tribe). In meliponiculture, the hives can be organized in meliponary, places with suitable conditions of temperature, solar orientation, humidity, and food supply (flowers and resins).

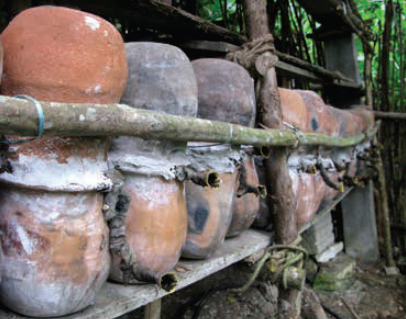
Traditional Aztec meliponiculture system in clay boxes or ollas

The objectives of meliponiculture are to produce and sell hives (or parts of them), honey, pollen, resins, propolis, wax, and other substrates such as attractants and trap nests; in addition to the ecosystem service of pollination itself, since bees are one of the main agents of pollination and the maintenance of biodiversity. Furthermore, the activity may not provide saleable products but simply aim to protect species from extinction. Finally, it is also possible to use meliponines colonies to educate children about the environment, since most of these insects do not behave aggressively or harm human beings.

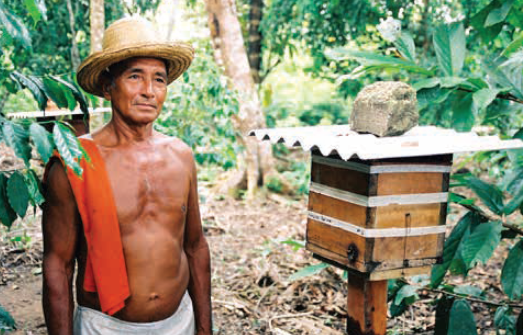
Meliponiculturist from Boa Vista do Ramos, Amazonas

Indigenous peoples and traditional communities already raised stingless bees and used their honey for various health treatments (such as cataracts), for food and subsistence. Meliponiculture has long been practiced by the native peoples of Latin America, especially those of Brazil and Mexico.

Currently, there is a trend towards technification and the growth of scientific knowledge related to the breeding and management of stingless bees, as it is an activity that generates products with high added value and is related to the preservation of natural environments.

== Sustainable activity ==
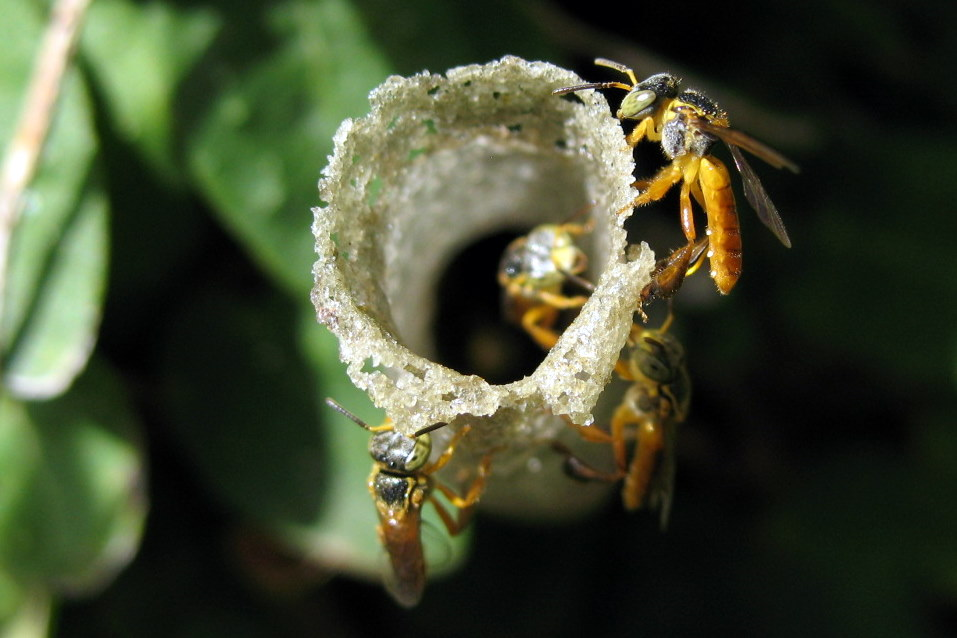
Yellow jataí nest entrance (Tetragonisca angustula)

In Brazil there are approximately 56% species of stingless bees out of the 462 that have been described in the world (some studies indicate 552 species), many of which have specific characteristics and are suitable for sustainable agro-ecological development, such as the yellow jataí (Tetragonisca angustula). Even though some species have no zootechnical agronomic value, the breeding of these hives is also part of meliponiculture, in a more recreational and conservationist way.

Meliponiculture is economically, environmentally, and socially important in the various niches and regions where bees occur, as it does not require intensive care or high investment in the creation of a meliponary. The activity can even be carried out by beekeepers of all ages, including children and the elderly. In addition, stingless bees can be kept in residential areas, as many species do not present any risk of accidents.

Honey produced by native bees - which is considered healthier due to its lower sugar content, higher acidity, and greater humidity compared to Apis honey - has become highly coveted, reaching prices ranging from R$80 to R$300 per liter. The demand for this honey is driven by its superior quality, attributed to native bee hives, which generally gather fewer individuals and produce lower quantities compared to the more common European honey bee colonies. While the latter can house between 60,000 and 120,000 insects, native Brazilian bees form swarms of no more than 5,000 individuals. Thus, the more limited production results in an exclusive and valued offer, with quantities ranging from 100 ml to three or four liters of honey being obtained from a single hive.

== Relationship with native peoples ==
Knowledge about these bees and meliponiculture in the Americas dates back to ancient times. In several Latin American countries, except for Chile, there is evidence of the relationship between native peoples and these insects, both through extractive exploitation and rudimentary breeding techniques.

In Central America, descendants of the Mayan and Aztec civilizations maintain a significant relationship with stingless bees, going beyond food use. Some species play important roles in the cosmology and traditional medicine of these cultures, and native bees were domesticated by pre-Columbian peoples, with traditional breeding practices still in use.

In Brazil, contrary to reports of traditional beekeeping in other countries, the practice was practically non-existent. Except for semi-domestication practices documented in the Gorotire village, where the Kayapó extracted honey without harming the bees, extractive and predatory exploitation were common. Before the introduction of the A. mellifera bee and the expansion of sugar production, honey from native bees played a crucial role as the main natural sweetener for indigenous peoples, providing energy on their journeys to hunt and search for food.

== Main Brazilian species ==
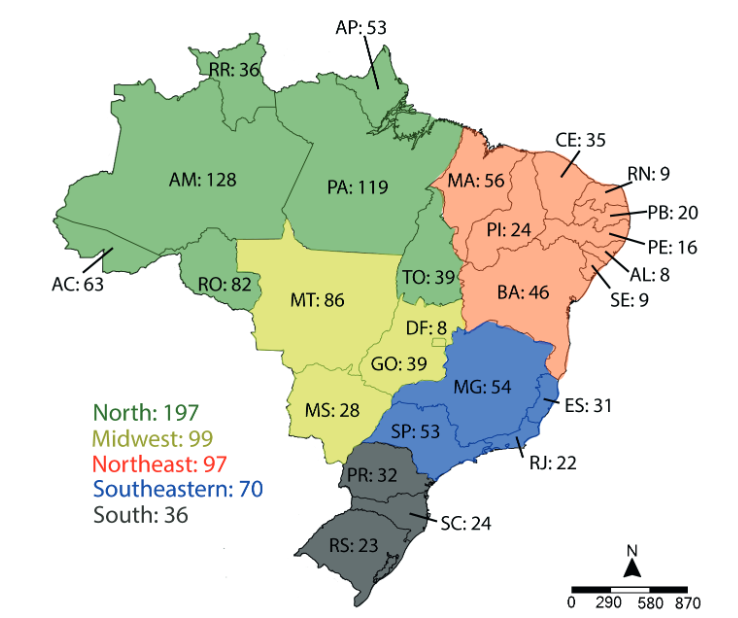
Number of valid species of stingless bees in Brazil. State and region cut-outs. Study published in 2023.

All species of meliponas are eusocial, i.e. they have a work structure divided into castes, where the workers (female bees) carry out most of the activities to support the swarm, such as building and maintaining the brood discs/bunches, collecting and processing food, cleaning and protecting the colony and caring for the young. The queen is responsible for laying the eggs. The males are responsible for fertilizing the princesses (virgin queens) and secondary tasks within the colony.

In Brazil, there are approximately 259 species of stingless bees (studies suggest between 462 and 550 worldwide). Most of this biodiversity is found in the North, which is home to 197 species. The Central-West and Northeast regions have 99 and 97 species respectively. The best known and most managed species are listed below.

Common names (in Portuguese or Indigenous languages)	Scientific names
Scaptotrigonas
Canudo	Scaptotrigona depilis
Benjoi, benjoin	Scaptotrigona polysticta
Mandaguari-preta	Scaptotrigona postica
Mandaguari-amarela	Scaptotrigona xanthotricha
Meliponas
Guarupu, guaraipo	Melipona bicolor
Jandaíra	Melipona subnitida
Manduri	Melipona marginata
Manduri-preta, uruçu, uruçu-boi	Melipona fuliginosa
Mandaçaia (2 species)	Melipona quadrifasciata Melipona mandacaia
Mandaçaia-de-buraco, mandaçaia-da-terra, uruçu-do-chão	Melipona quinquefasciata
Tiúba	Melipona compressipes
Uruçu-nordestina, uruçu-verdadeira	Melipona scutellaris
Uruçu-amarela (3 species)	Melipona flavolineata Melipona rufiventris Melipona mondury
Uruçu-boca-de-renda	Melipona seminigra
Uruçu-preta, uruçu-negra	Melipona capixaba
Plebeias
Mirim-droriana	Plebeia droryana
Mosquito	Plebeia minima
Mirim-guaçú	Plebeia remota
Frieseomelittas
Marmelada	Frieseomelitta varia
Mocinha-preta	Frieseomelitta languida
Others
Jataí-amarela	Tetragonisca angustula
Iraí	Nannotrigona testaceicornis
Borá	Tetragona clavipes

=== Notable species ===
Some other species, although not commonly bred by meliponiculturists, are well known and interact in different ways with meliponaries and agricultural environments.

Common names	Scientific names
Boca-de-sapo	Partamona helleri
Tataíra, caga-fogo	Oxytrigona tataira
Sanharão	Trigona truculenta
Arapuá	Trigona spinipes
Limão, sete-portas	Lestrimelitta limao

=== Brazilian endangered species ===
Conservation status of species by the International Union for Conservation of Nature (IUCN)

According to ICMBio, in 2018 there were four species of meliponine classified as "endangered" (EN) in Brazil.

Red Book of Endangered Brazilian Species 2018
Common names	Scientific names	Occurrence	Status
Uruçu-amarela	Melipona rufventris	GO, MS, MG, SP	EN
Uruçu-amarela	Melipona scutellaris	AL, BA, CE, PB, PE, RN, SE	EN
Uruçu-capixaba	Melipona capixaba	ES	EN
	Partamona littoralis	PB, RN	EN

== Colony capture ==
In 2004, the National Environment Council (CONAMA) published a resolution highlighting the importance of native wild bees to the Brazilian ecosystem. These bees, their nests, and breeding grounds are considered common goods, as provided for in the Federal Constitution of Brazil. The document recognizes the economic relevance of local and regional meliponiculture, as well as the importance of bees in the stability of ecosystems and the sustainability of agriculture. It also highlights Brazil's commitment to the conservation and sustainable use of pollinators, as agreed in the Convention on Biological Diversity.

=== Making trap nests ===
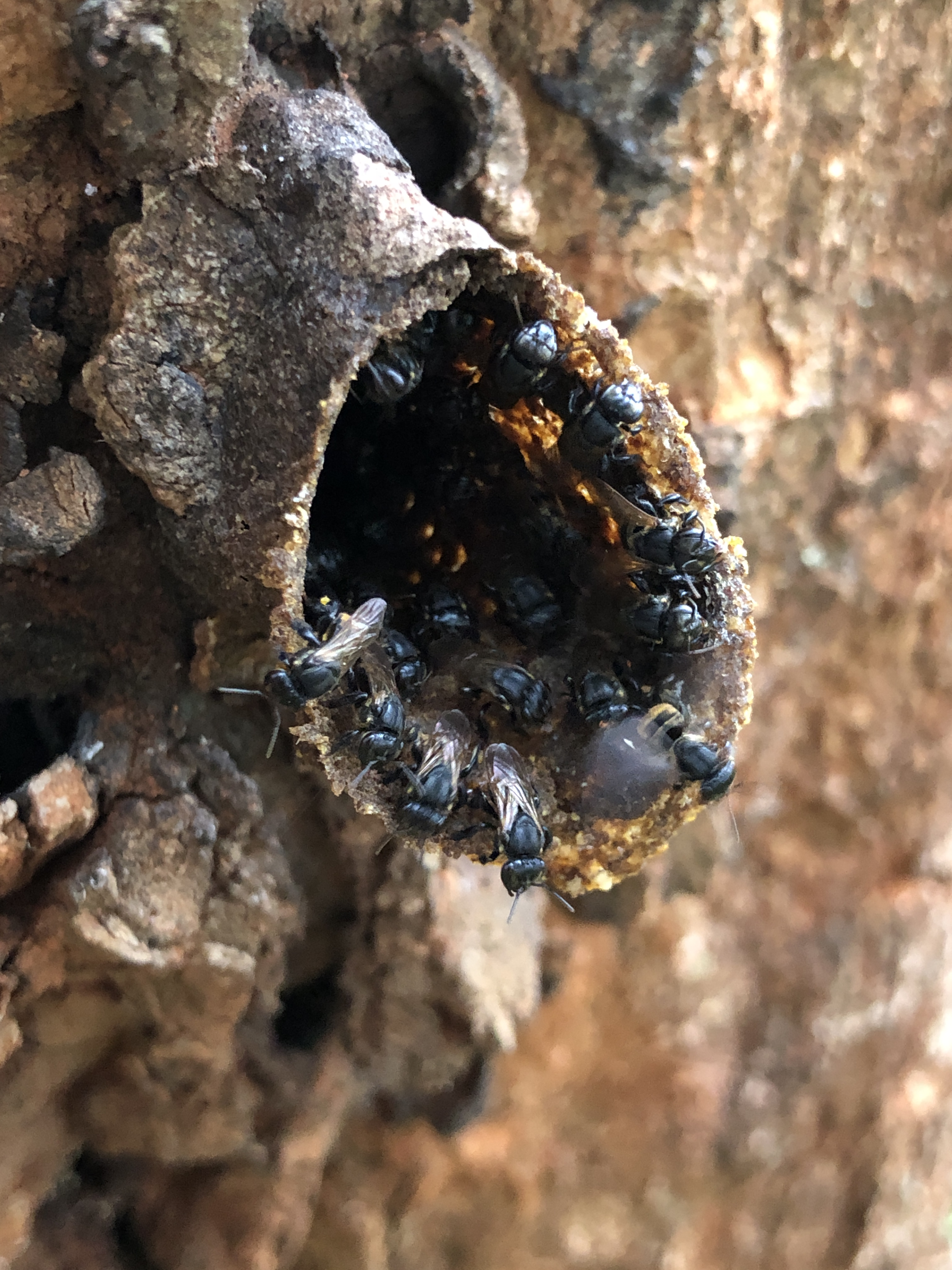
Mandaguari-preta (S. postica) nesting in a tree in Brasília, DF

Resolution 346/2004 allows swarms to be captured from the wild using trap nests or methods that are not destructive to the environment. This means that the extraction and exploitation of natural beehives are prohibited, except in the case of licensed undertakings that incur the deforestation of the area.

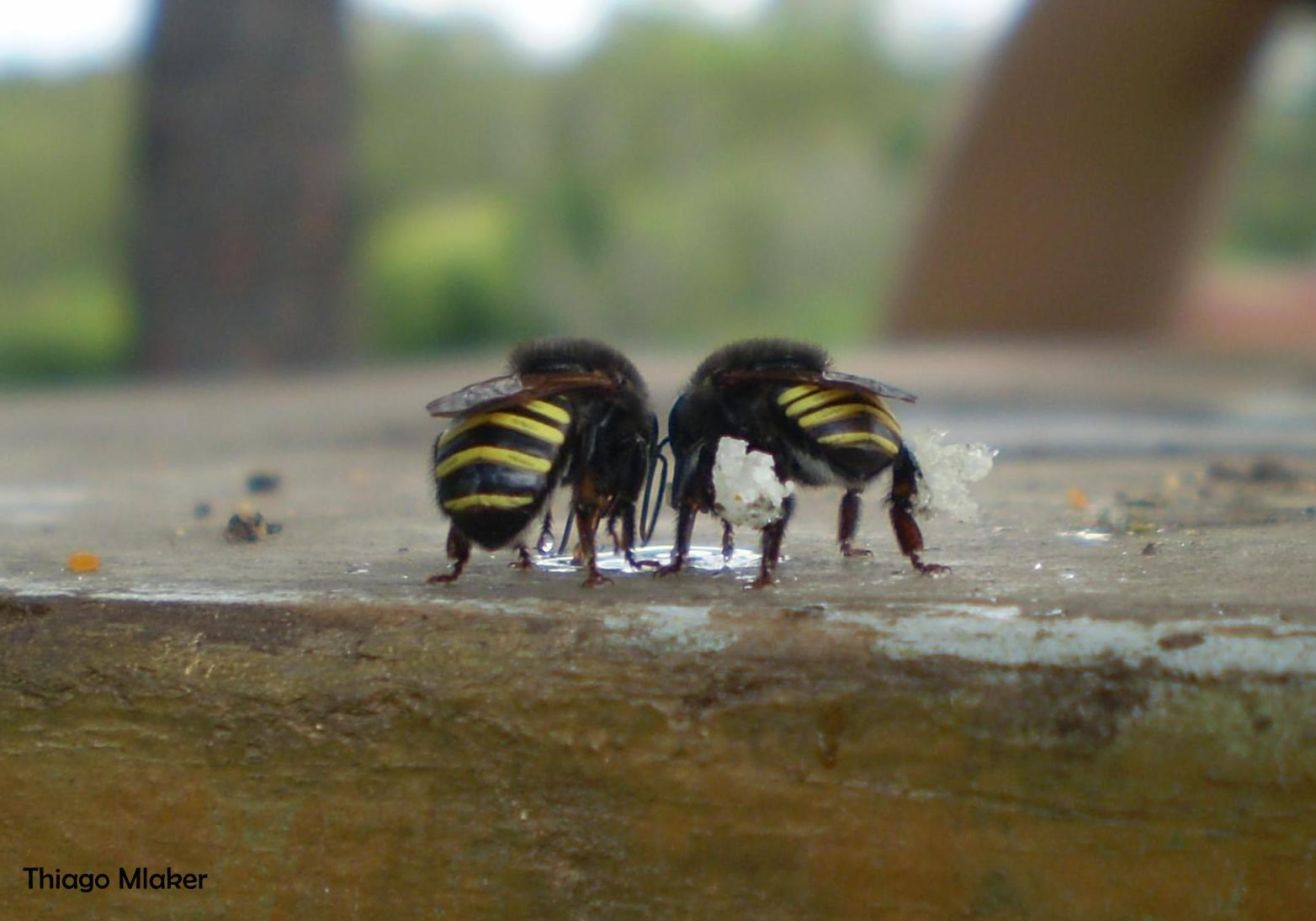
Mandaçaia (M. quadrifasciata) carrying pollen in their corbicula

Nogueira-Neto has a section in his book Vida e Criação de Abelhas Indígenas sem Ferrão (English: Life and Breeding of Indigenous Stingless Bees) that provides information on the removal of natural nests. This section should be interpreted, especially after the CONAMA legislation, as a tutorial for cases of rescuing colonies from trees or structures that are to be removed. The practice of removing natural nests for rational breeding without any reason that endangers the target colony is not permitted under Brazilian law.

Trap nests are containers, boxes, hives, or objects that have the purpose of capturing a bee colony that is naturally swarming (the process of the mother colony duplicating itself, resulting in a daughter colony in a newly available location). Suggestions for materials and tutorials for making these devices can be found in books, such as the Manual Tecnológico de Aproveitamento Integral dos Produtos das Abelhas Nativas sem Ferrão (English: Technological Manual for the Integral Use of the Products of Native Stingless Bees), or on YouTube channels specialized in meliponiculture.

Trap nests can be made in a variety of ways, but in general, meliponiculturists usually use the following materials and techniques.

Objective	Materials used
Colony space	PET bottles, wooden boxes, bamboo stalks, gallons, etc.
Thermal insulation	Cardboard, newspaper, paper, fabric, etc.
Light insulation	Black plastic, garbage bags, etc.
Attractive smell	Attractive liquid
Inlet hole	Simple holes, plumbing "elbows", bamboo pipes, etc.
Closing and assembly	Scissors, seals, adhesive tape, styluses.

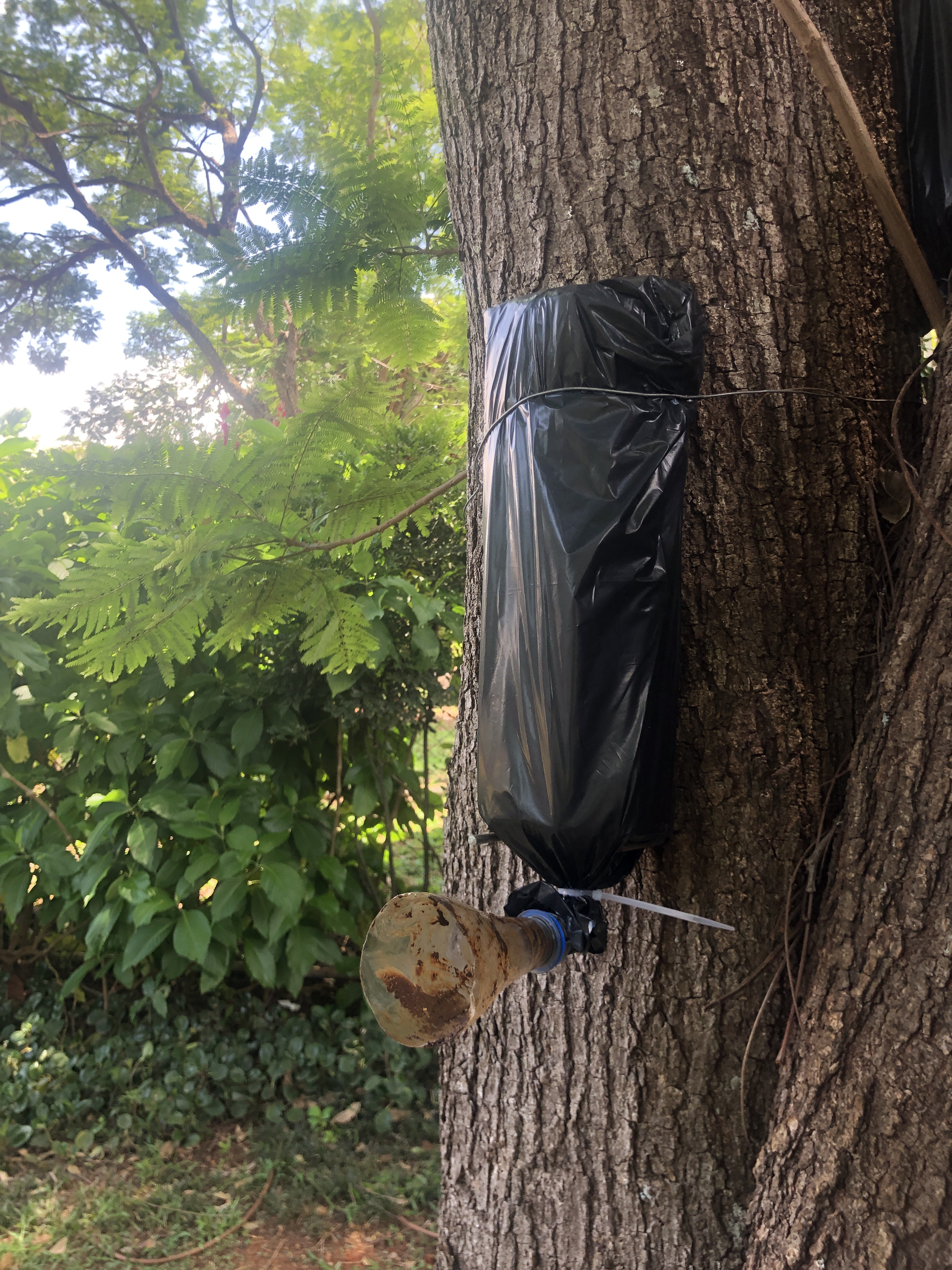
Trap nest with inlet nozzle (optional) installed in a tree

The most common trap nests are made with 1.5 to 5 liter PET bottles soaked inside with an attractive liquid (propolis, resins, geopropolis, and cerumen diluted in alcohol) and wrapped with cardboard or newspaper and black plastic, imitating the hollow interior of trees. To produce the attractive liquid, the beekeeper usually lets the product dissolve for a few weeks, shaking it daily.

=== Installation sites ===
Trap nests should be installed in places where the bee species one wants to catch occurs. It is preferable to place baits during the peak swarming period, which varies according to the region. Sites commonly used for installation have good shading from 10 am on and accessibility.

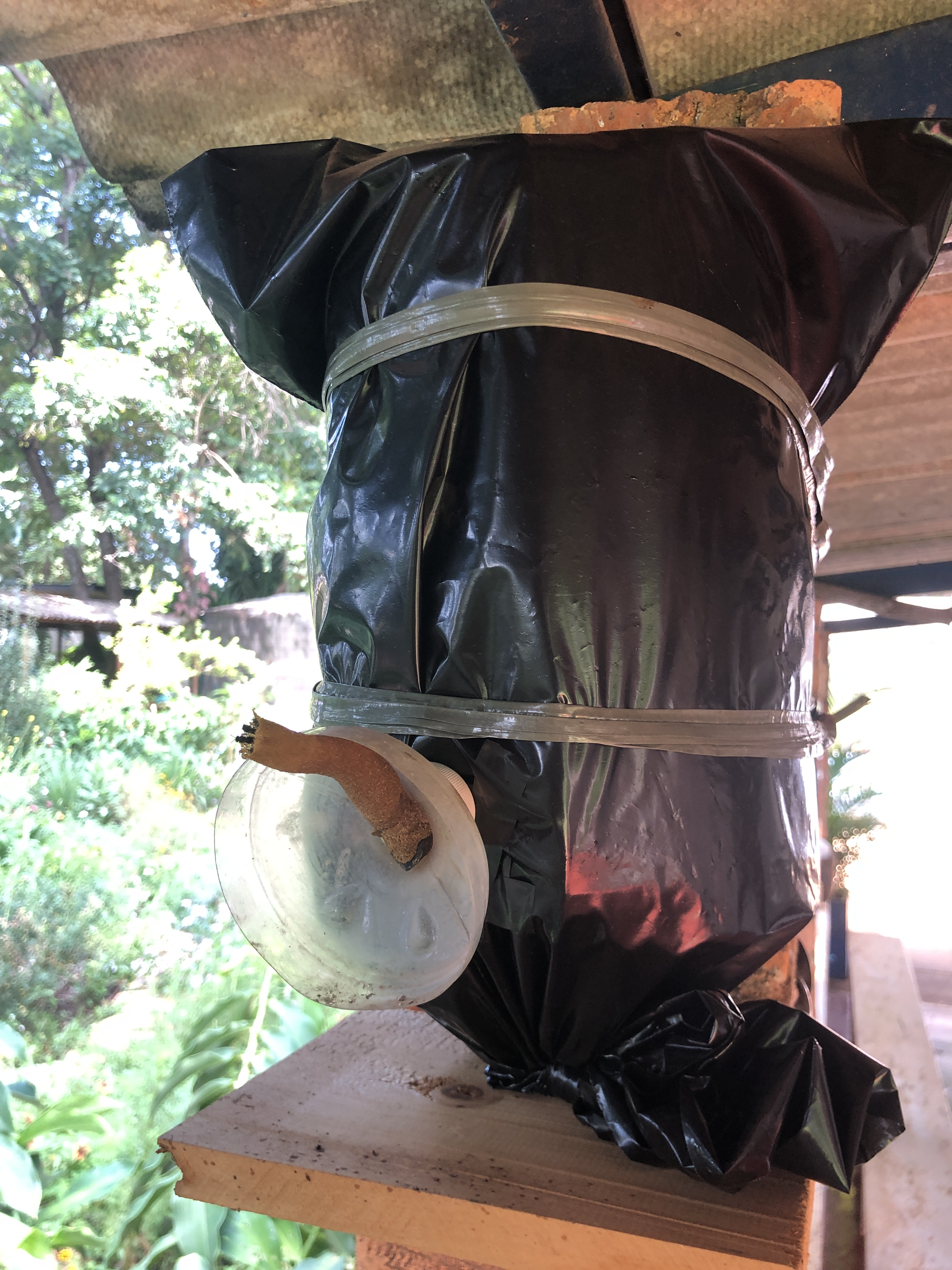
Trap nest with capture of iraí (N. testaceicornis)

The relationship between the mother nest and the offspring nest usually ends when the first young are born. Between 30 and 90 days after the swarm is installed in the trap nest, it should be moved to the final location/meliponary and then transferred to a rational hive (usually wooden boxes), which should be more than 300 meters from the capture site.

The bees should be transported at night, when the workers have not left the hive to forage, or during the day with the entrance to the colony previously closed at night.

== Colony multiplication ==
The biology of many Meliponini species allows their nests to be divided in order to multiply the swarms in the meliponary. The best time to split colonies is during the same period as natural swarming, i.e. when the food supply is increasing. The methods are varied and can involve one or more strong swarms to create a second or third. Care must always be taken when handling the brood disks/bunches, the queen, and the food pots, as they are very fragile. The procedure should be carried out on sunny, windless days.

Swarm multiplication is one of the ways allowed by CONAMA to obtain new swarms of stingless bees. These colonies can even be marketed as an economic alternative in meliponiculture.

In bees of the genus Melipona, some of the workers are born as princesses (virgin queens), while other bee species have the mechanism of laying larger brood cells that give rise to princesses instead of ordinary workers. These cells are called realeiras, or royal cells.

=== Brood disk donation method ===
This is a widespread method used in traditional beekeeping in various regions of Brazil. In this method, the "mother colony" transfers two to four discs of "mature brood" (which has a yellowish color) to start populating a new box, known as the "daughter colony". The mature brood contains bees about to be born, allowing the workers to recover more quickly in the new box.

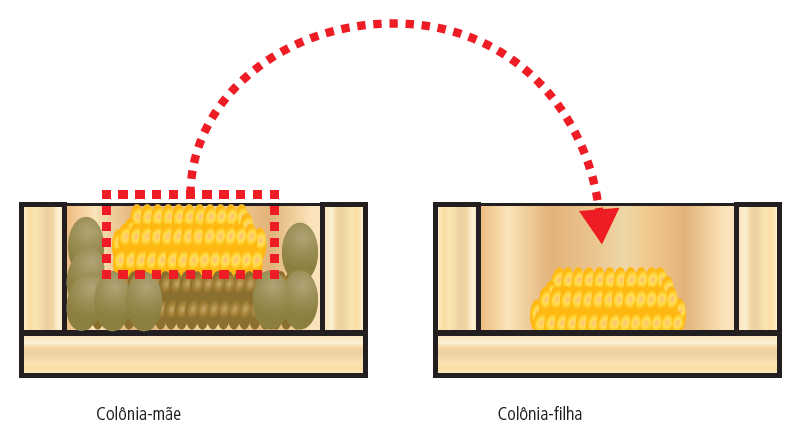
Diagram of the method for donating calf disks

The daughter colony needs to be positioned on the site previously occupied by the mother colony. In this way, it will receive the forager bees that are flying around to help defend and organize the new box. The mother colony should be transported and installed at a distance of at least 10 meters to prevent the queen's pheromones from attracting the queen bees. This will ensure that the queen bees remain in the new box. More details can be found in Villas-Bôas (2018).

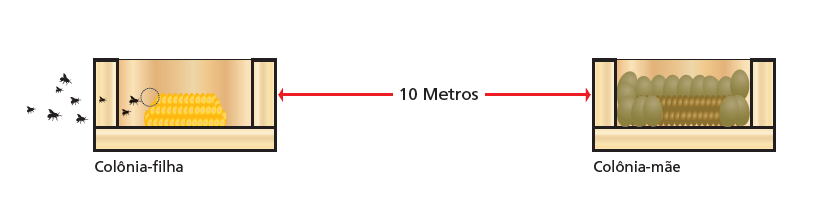
Distance between boxes in the method of donating calf discs

=== Minimum disturbance method ===
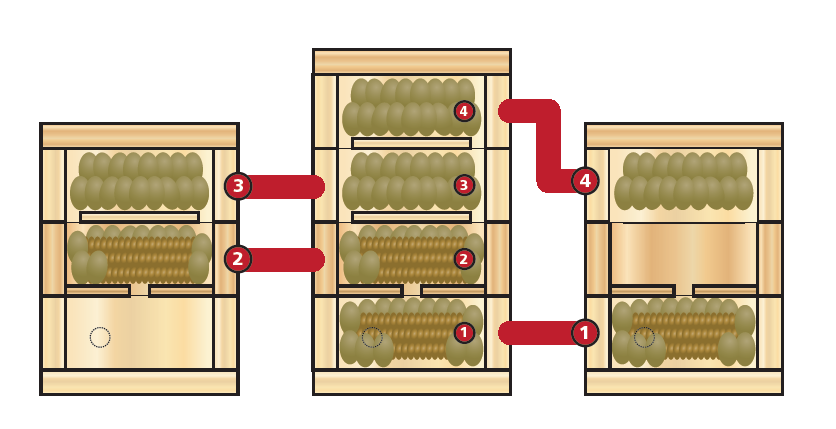
1 and 2: Nest and over-nest modules. 3 and 4: Honey modules.

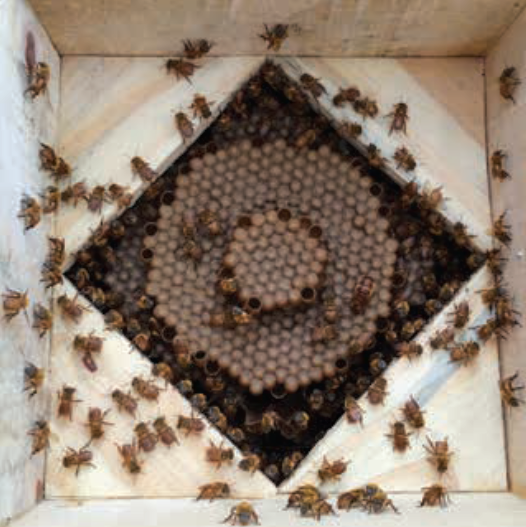
The nest module's choke is square-shaped. It is also commonly made in a circular shape. The idea is that the nest can be built freely, but the auxiliary side structures and food pots are supported by the choke to facilitate handling.

The minimum disturbance method is applied using standardized box models (such as the "Fernando Oliveira" box or INPA box), which stand out for their ability to divide swarms without the need to manipulate the brood combs by hand. This method makes it possible to obtain two colonies from the division of a single one in just a few minutes, resulting in an accelerated recovery of the swarm and a lower incidence of post-division pests. The efficiency of this model is attributed to the standardized nest modules, which have brood disc chokes (circular or rhombus-shaped).

During the multiplication process, the modules are separated, dividing the internal structure of the nest into two halves. The chokers provide lateral support to the upper part, eliminating the need to use your hands to divide the feed pots that are around the brood disks. The sequence of figures illustrates the steps involved in dividing a colony of uruçu-boca-de-renda (M. seminigra), highlighting the use of the minimum disturbance method. The colony in this example has two hives full of food, favoring the splitting process.

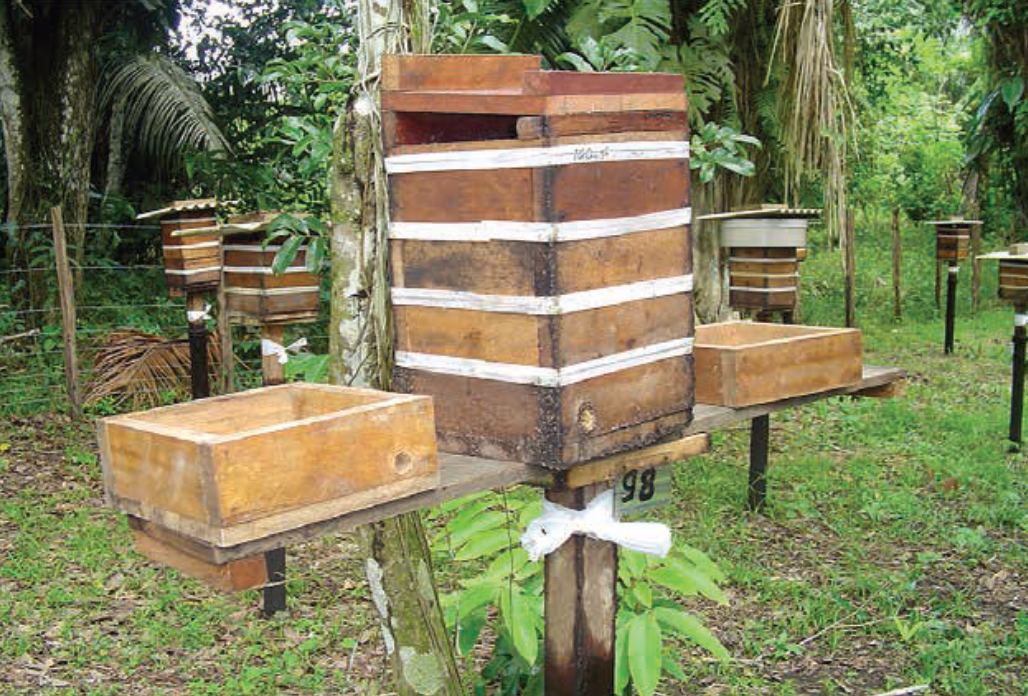
Step 1: box to be divided and new modules positioned

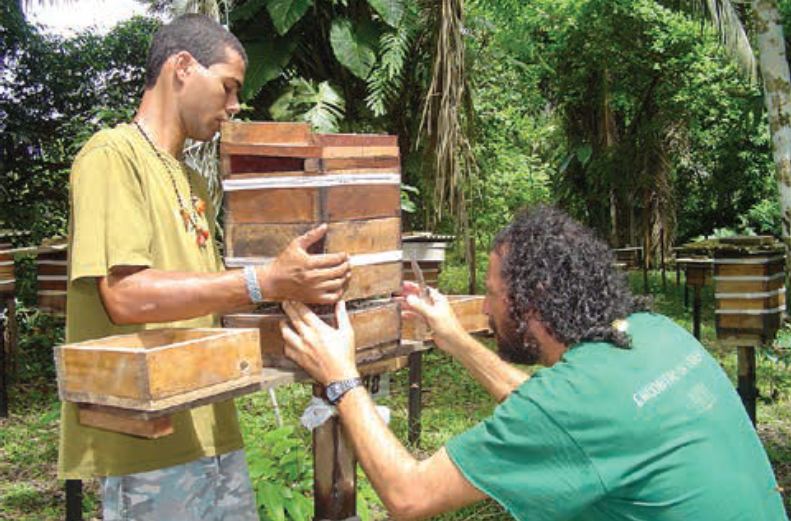
Step 2: separating the nest modules

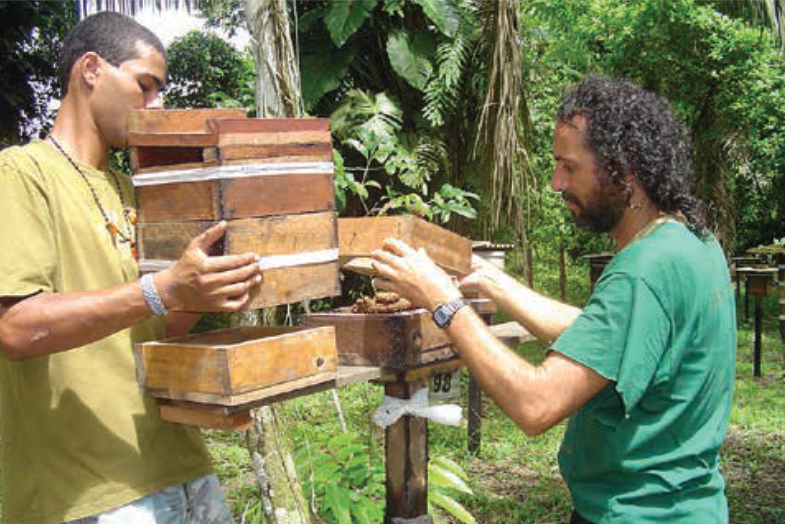
Step 3: nest module goes on top of an empty nest module and over-nest module goes under another empty nest module.

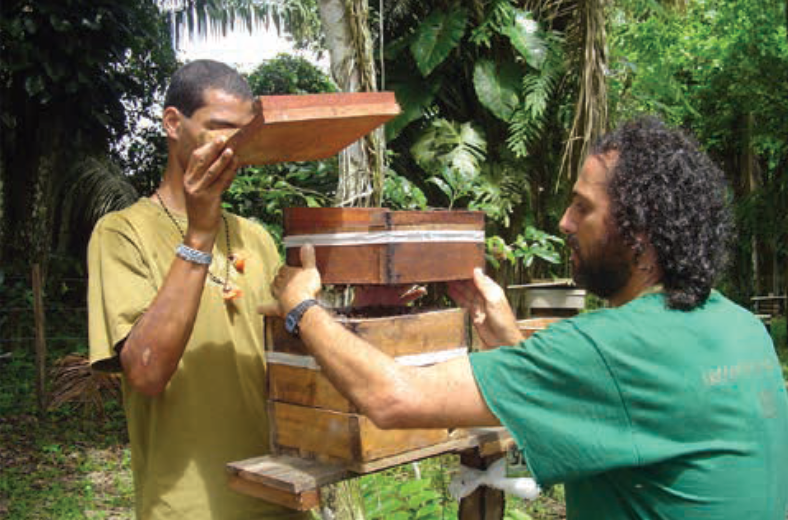
Step 4: separating the honey modules

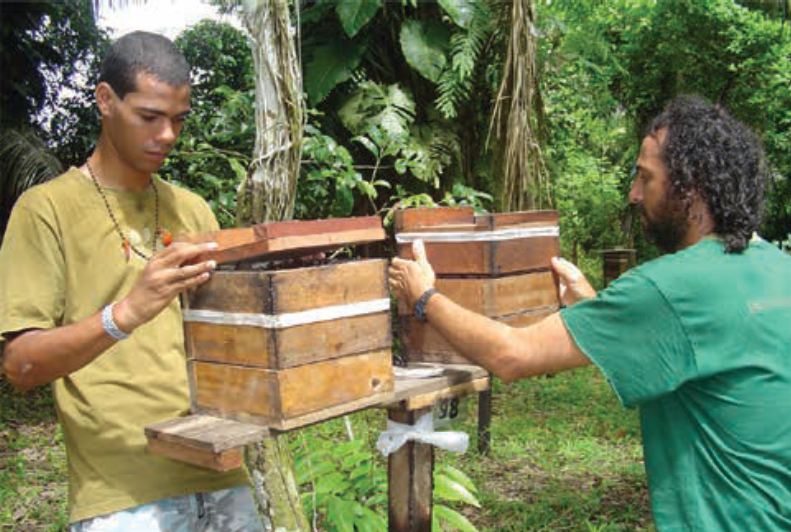
Step 5: allocate one hive module to each box.

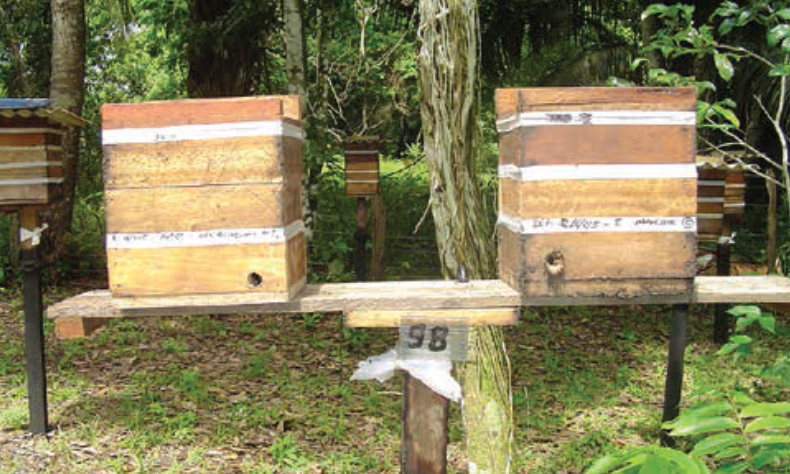
Step 6: division successfully completed and gaps sealed with adhesive tape

== Notable natural enemies ==
In meliponiculture, beekeepers must be aware of the presence of other animals that harm stingless bee colonies. There are many possible enemies, but the most important ones that cause the most damage to meliponaries are listed here. Examples of other unremarkable enemies are: moths, barbers, beetles, parasitoid wasps, spiders, mites, lizards and geckos.

=== Phorids ===
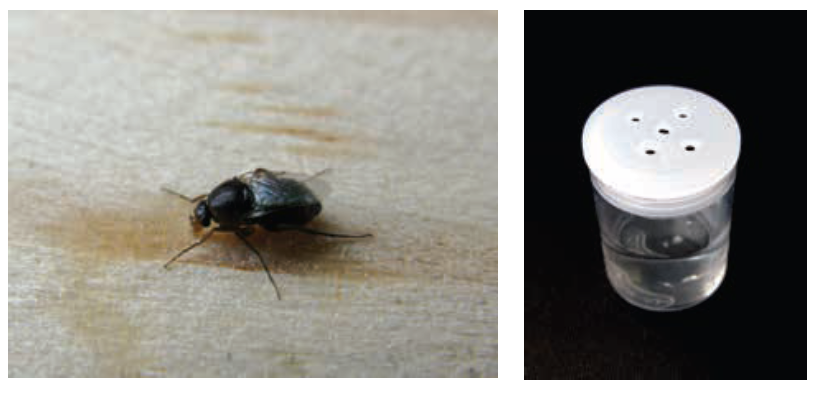
Phoridae and vinegar trap model

Phorids are small flies of the genus Pseudohypocrea (order Diptera, family Phoridae) that infiltrate the hive and lay their eggs in the open jars of pollen and honey. If the appropriate measures are not taken, new phorids will hatch in a few days and the cycle will start all over again, until the swarm is extinct. If detected early, they can be removed manually or using traps containing vinegar.

The recommendation is never to leave the phorid-infested box in the meliponary, as there is a risk of them spreading to other colonies. To prevent the proliferation of flies, food jars, especially pollen jars, should be handled with care and, if broken, removed from the box. All gaps should be sealed with wax or masking tape.

The colonies should be cared for during transfers and splits. This is when phorid infestations can occur. Rainy seasons are more favorable for the development of these flies.

=== Black soldier fly ===
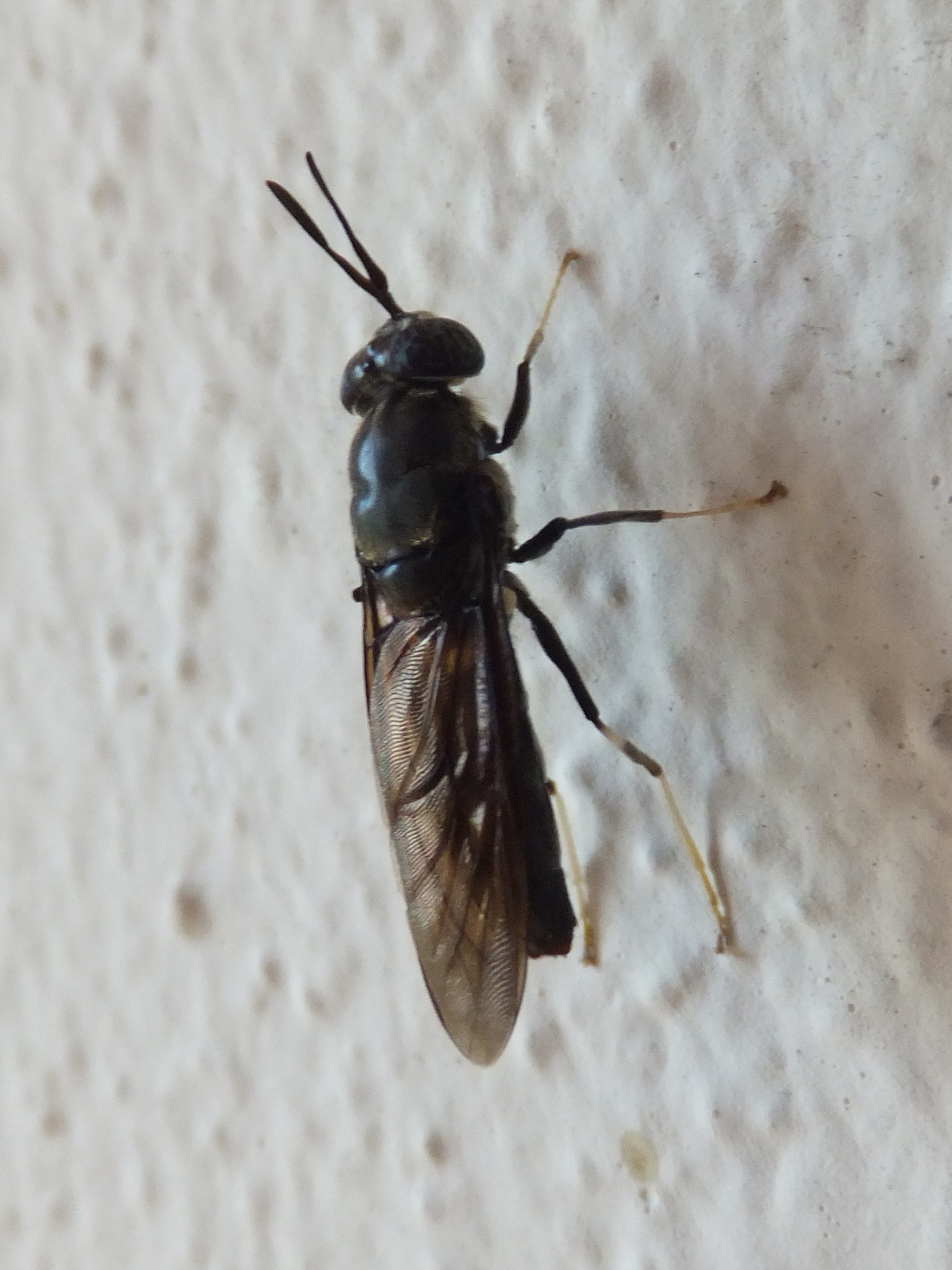
Black soldier fly (H. illucens)

Flies of the Hermetia illucens species lay their eggs in the crevices of the boxes and can extend the tip of their abdomen when laying, thus facilitating access to the inside of the hive. Black soldier fly larvae feed on pollen, feces and other materials found in colonies. In general, robust colonies are able to live harmoniously with the black fly, but in areas where the presence of this insect is significant, beekeepers must remain vigilant, protecting the gaps in the colonies to avoid possible problems.

=== Ants ===
Ants are attracted to the bee colony by the smell of food, making careful handling of boxes and avoiding exposure of pollen and honey pots crucial. Preventing attacks is essential, and careful handling of the boxes is the best defense. Although rare, when attacks do occur, there are intense conflicts between ants and bees. Although stingless bees are usually able to defend themselves, the damage to the bee population can be great.

An effective strategy to prevent such problems is to impregnate the box supports with burning oil, an especially viable alternative in meliponaries with individual supports. Burnt oil, which is easily obtained from oil stations, acts as an effective repellent against ants, preventing them from climbing into the boxes. This approach is not suitable for producers focused on organic honey production, as the use of burning oil is not permitted by the organic certification bodies.

=== Termites ===
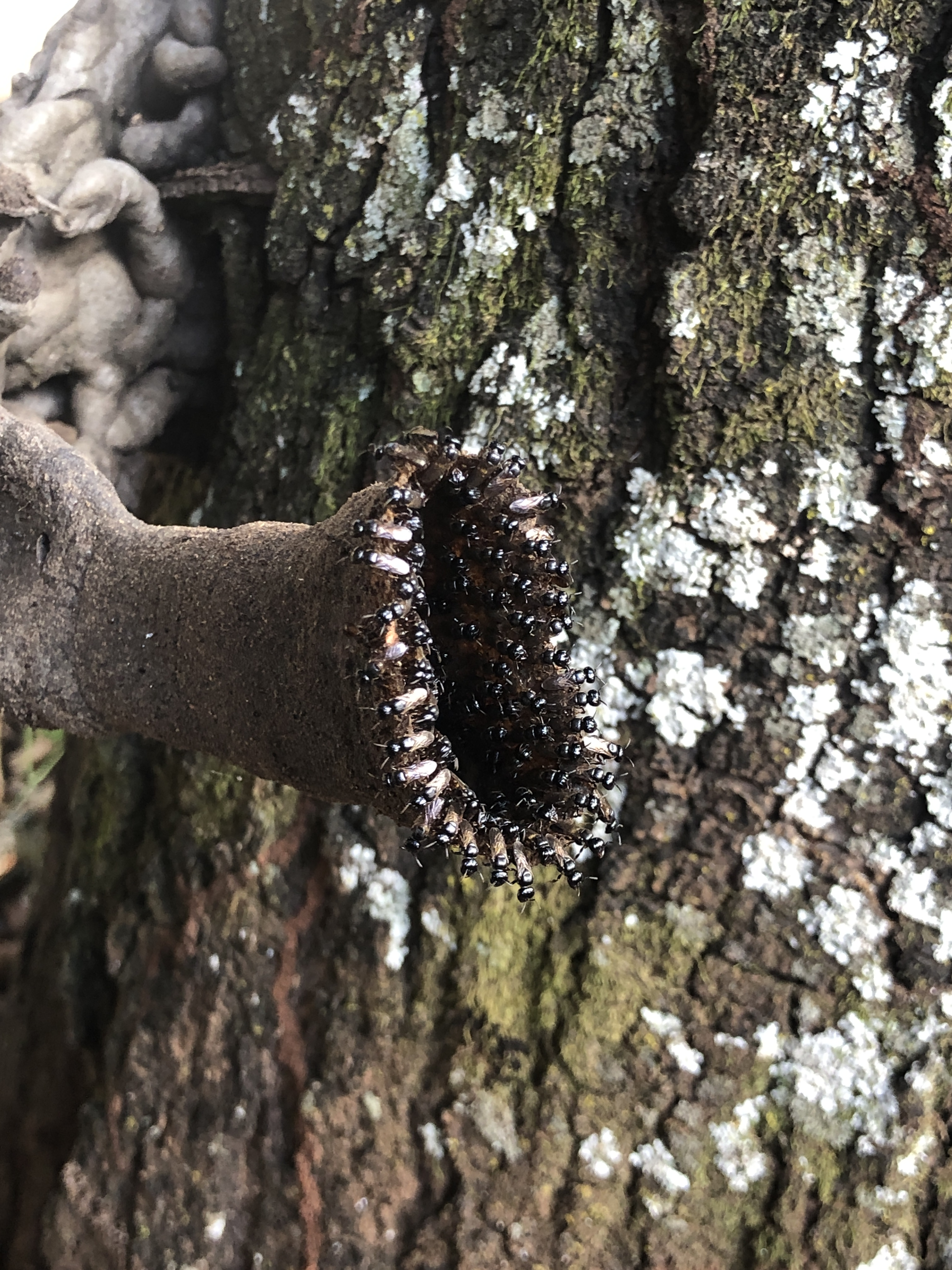
Lemon bee (L. limao) hive entrance

Termites (order Isoptera) do not attack bees or their food pots. The damage they can cause is to the structure of the hives' boxes, as there are many xylophagous species. Generally, termites don't cause major problems for beekeepers, but they are an important element to watch out for.

=== Robber bees ===
Some species of SB have a kleptoparasitic habit. Limão bees (genus Lestrimelitta) are species that specialize in plundering hives, confusing the workers with attack pheromones and stealing the colony's pollen and honey stocks and gnawing on the cerumen structures of the attacked swarm. These bees are popularly known as "robber bees". In Africa, similar behavior is observed in bees of the genus Cleptotrigona.

The literature indicates that some other species may show similar habits of plundering and invasion, such as: turuçu (M. fuliginosa), caga-fogo (O. tataira), guaxupé (Trigona hyalinata), arapuá (T. spinipes), borá (Tetragona clavipes).

== Rational hive ==
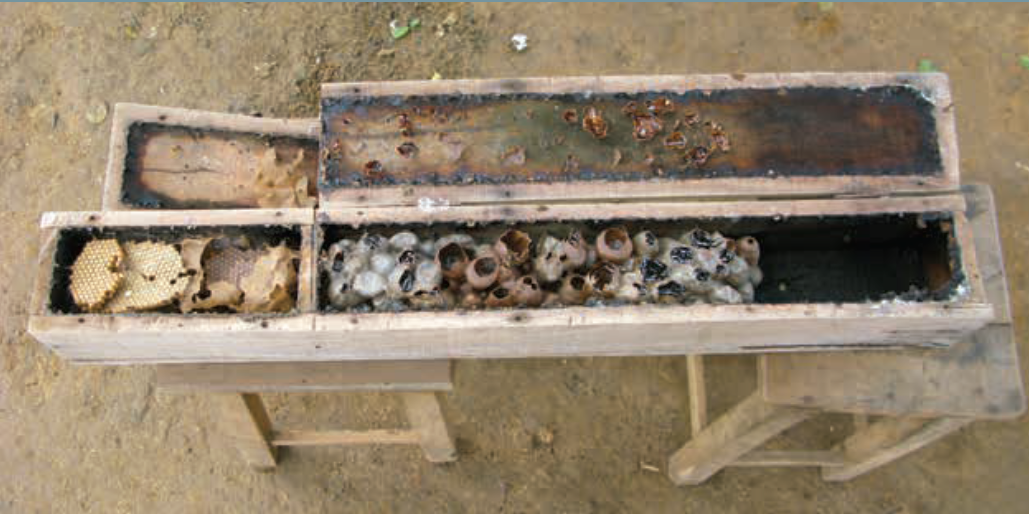
"Huberto Bruening" horizontal hive with a colony of jandaíra (M. subnitida). Note the specific space for housing the nest on the left and the space for storing honey on the right.

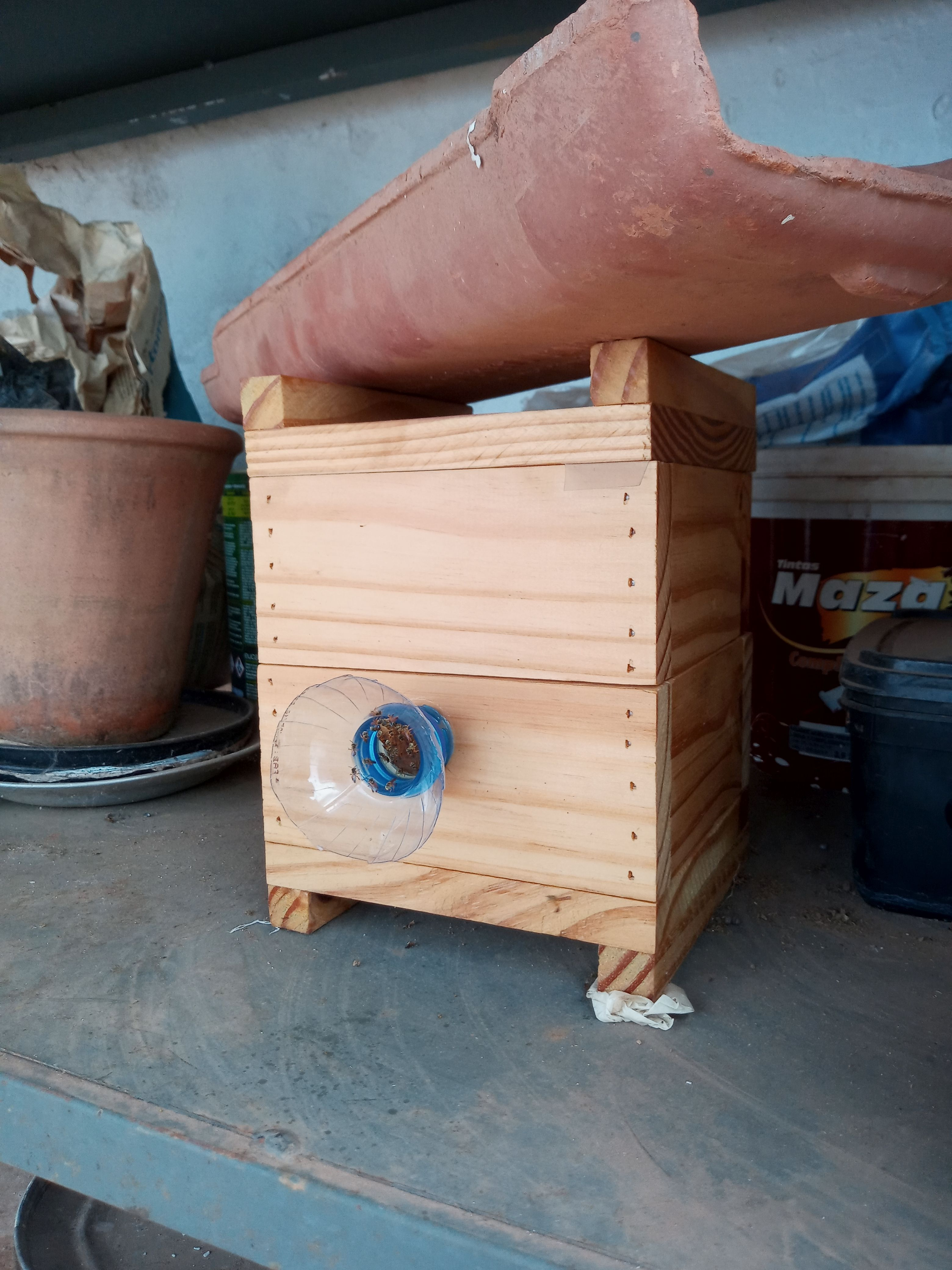
Rational modular wooden hive in the INPA (or "Fernando Oliveira") model, with nest and over-nest. The PET bottle nozzle helps protect against attacks by lizards, geckos and ants.

The rational hive is a structure built to house native bee colonies due to its ease of handling, unlike the rustic hive. Various models have been developed, each with a specific purpose and according to the characteristics of the species. They can be vertical or horizontal; single volume or modular; made of wood, concrete, bamboo or other materials.

In general, the rational hive, when modular, is segmented into two types of compartments: nests and honey modules. The nest can also be subdivided into a nest and an over-nest, in creations aimed at the unnatural multiplication/division of swarms. This is the place where the brood discs/clusters and the queen will be. The honey modul is the compartment where the jars of honey and/or pollen will be stored.

The material used to make the rational box is primarily wood, but there have also been experiments with concrete and other materials that have thermal, acoustic, humidity and light insulation characteristics, seeking similarity to the nesting sites found in nature and protection from predators.

The main objectives of rational boxes are to guarantee protection for the nest, optimize swarm division processes, facilitate the handling and collection of materials and facilitate the transport and handling of the colony.

== See also ==
- Entomology
- Pollination
- List of crop plants pollinated by bees

== Bibliography ==
- Villas-Bôas, Jerônimo (2018). Manual Tecnológico de Aproveitamento Integral dos Produtos das Abelhas Nativas sem Ferrão (PDF). p. 216.
- Nogueira-Neto, Paulo (1997). Vida e Criação de Abelhas Indígenas sem Ferrão (PDF).
- Grüter, Christoph (2020). Stingless Bees: Their Behaviour, Ecology and Evolution. Fascinating Life Sciences. Cham: Springer International Publishing. doi:10.1007/978-3-030-60090-7. ISBN 978-3-030-60089-1.
