= Ptilotrigona lurida =

Scientific classification
- Domain: Eukaryota
- Kingdom: Animalia
- Phylum: Arthropoda
- Class: Insecta
- Order: Hymenoptera
- Family: Apidae
- Genus: Ptilotrigona
- Species: P. lurida

Binomial name
- Ptilotrigona lurida (Smith, 1854)

Synonyms
- Trigona heideri Friese, 1900; Trigona lurida Smith, 1854; Trigona manni Cockerell, 1912; Trigona mocsaryi Friese, 1900; Trigona mocsaryi subsp. lutea Friese, 1903

Species of bee

Ptilotrigona lurida, known as the borá-cavalo, abelha-piranha ("piranha bee"), or corta-cabelos ("hair-cutting bee") in Brazil, is a species of eusocial stingless bee in the family Apidae and tribe Meliponini.

== See also ==
- Tetragona clavipes (borá)
- Tetragona quadrangula (borá-de-chão)
- Tetragona goettei
