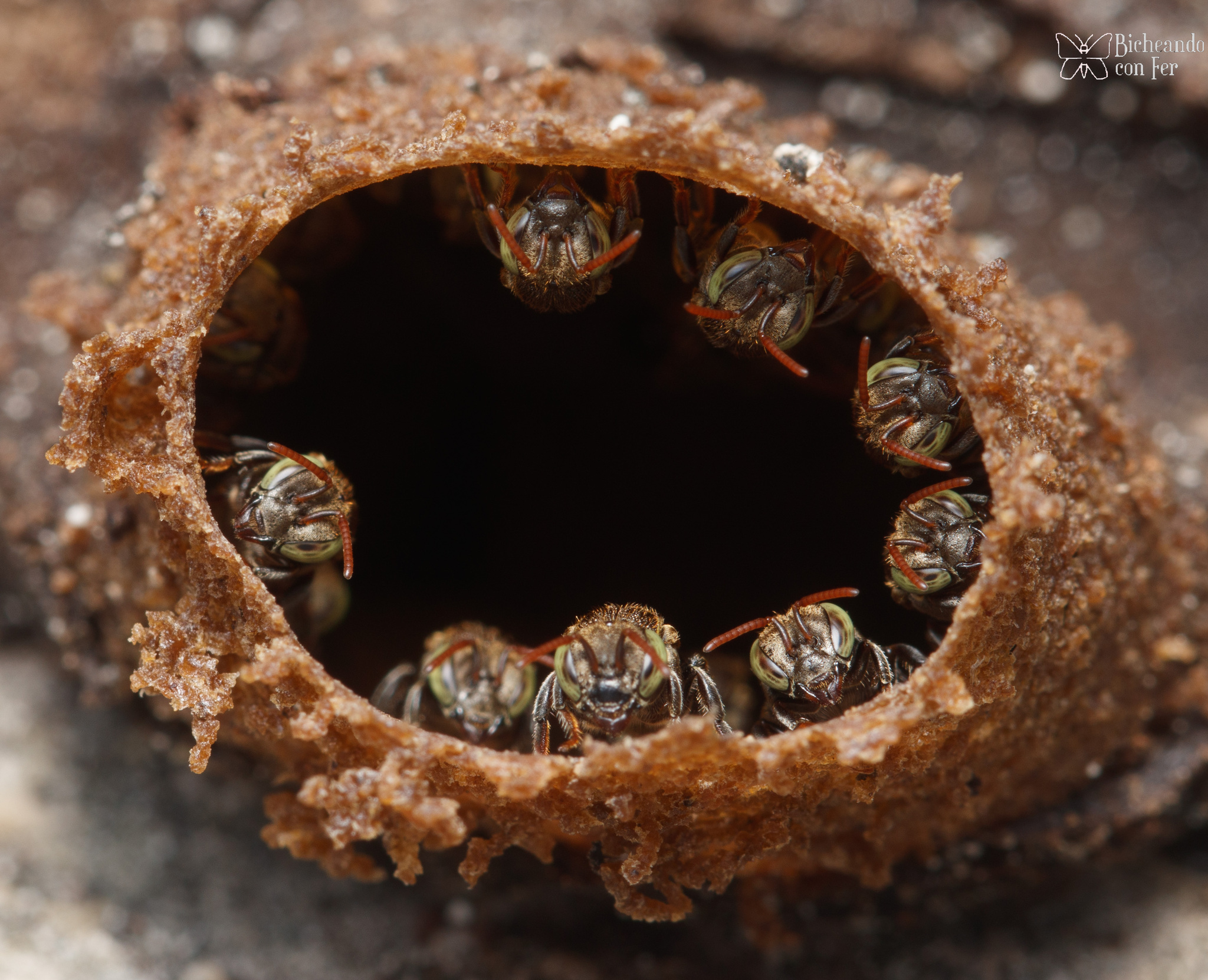
- Nannotrigona perilampoides

Scientific classification
- Kingdom: Animalia
- Phylum: Arthropoda
- Class: Insecta
- Order: Hymenoptera
- Family: Apidae
- Tribe: Meliponini
- Genus: Nannotrigona; Cockerell, 1922

= Nannotrigona =

Genus of bees

Nannotrigona is a genus of bees belonging to the family Apidae. The species of this genus are found in Central and South America.

== Species ==
The following species are recognised in the genus Nannotrigona:

- Nannotrigona camargoi Rasmussen & Gonzalez, 2017
- Nannotrigona chapadana (Schwarz, 1938)
- Nannotrigona dutrae (Friese, 1901)
- Nannotrigona gaboi Jaramillo, Ospina & Gonzalez, 2019
- Nannotrigona melanocera (Schwarz, 1938)
- Nannotrigona mellaria (Smith, 1862)
- Nannotrigona minuta (Lepeletier, 1836)
- Nannotrigona occidentalis Jaramillo, Ospina & Gonzalez, 2019
- Nannotrigona perilampoides (Cresson, 1879)
- Nannotrigona pilosa Jaramillo, Ospina & Gonzalez, 2019
- Nannotrigona punctata (Smith, 1854)
- Nannotrigona schultzei (Friese, 1901)
- Nannotrigona testaceicornis (Lepeletier, 1836)
- Nannotrigona tristella Cockerell, 1922
