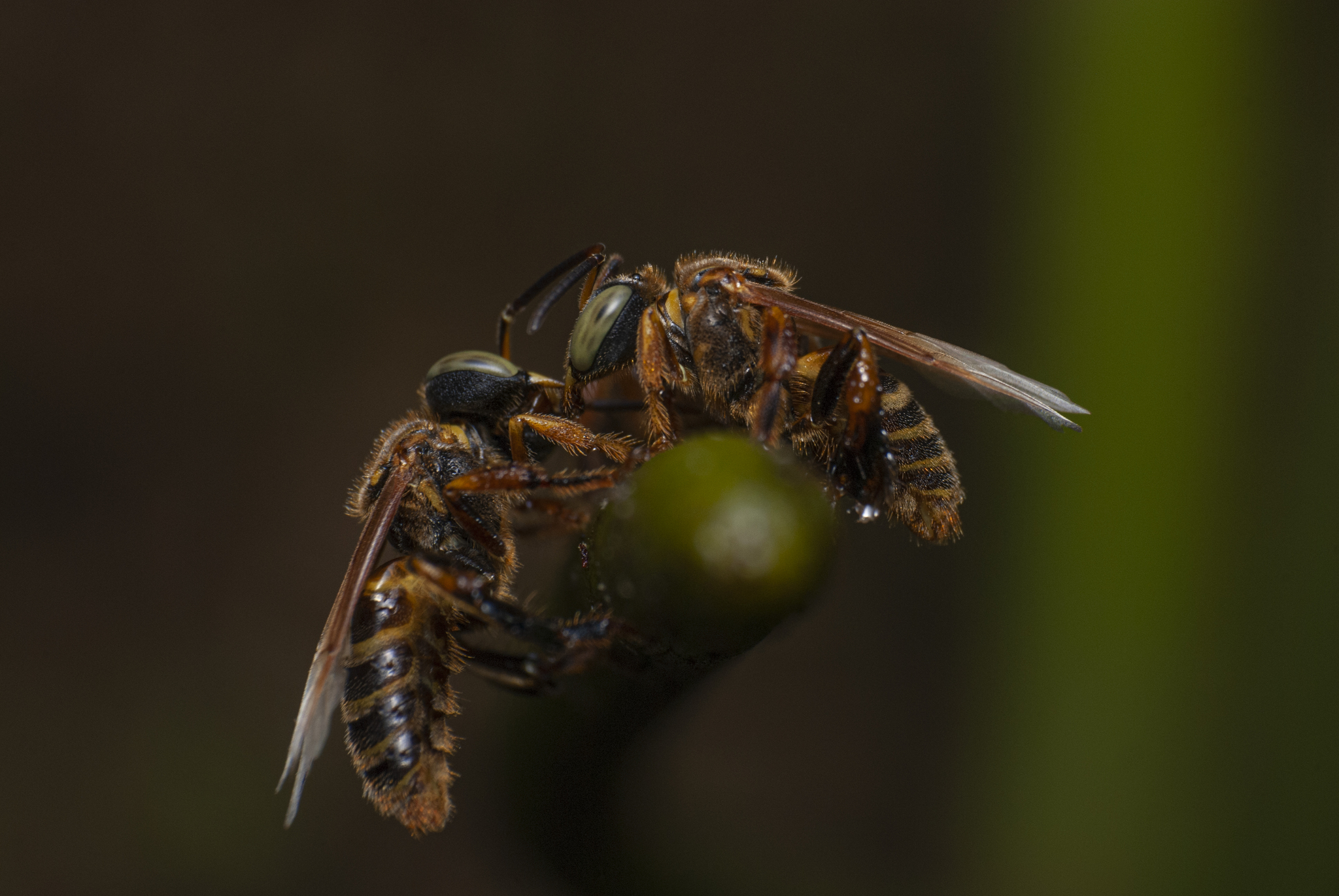
- Tetragona clavipes

Scientific classification
- Kingdom: Animalia
- Phylum: Arthropoda
- Class: Insecta
- Order: Hymenoptera
- Family: Apidae
- Tribe: Meliponini
- Genus: Tetragona; Lepeletier & Audinet-Serville, 1828

= Tetragona =

Genus of bees

Tetragona is a genus of bees belonging to the family Apidae.

The species of this genus are found in South America.

Species:

- Tetragona beebei (Schwarz, 1938)
- Tetragona clavipes (Fabricius, 1804)
- Tetragona dissecta Moure, 2000
- Tetragona dorsalis (Smith, 1854)
- Tetragona essequiboensis (Schwarz, 1940)
- Tetragona goettei (Friese, 1900)
- Tetragona handlirschii (Friese, 1900)
- Tetragona kaieteurensis (Schwarz, 1938)
- Tetragona mayarum (Cockerell, 1912)
- Tetragona perangulata (Cockerell, 1917)
- Tetragona quadrangula (Lepeletier, 1836)
- Tetragona truncata Moure, 1971
- Tetragona ziegleri (Friese, 1900)
