= Tetragona dorsalis =

Scientific classification
- Kingdom: Animalia
- Phylum: Arthropoda
- Class: Insecta
- Order: Hymenoptera
- Family: Apidae
- Genus: Tetragona
- Species: T. dorsalis

Binomial name
- Tetragona dorsalis (Smith, 1854)

Species of bee

Tetragona dorsalis, known as abelha-bico-de-vidro ("glass-mouth bee") in Brazil, is a species of eusocial stingless bee in the family Apidae and tribe Meliponini.
