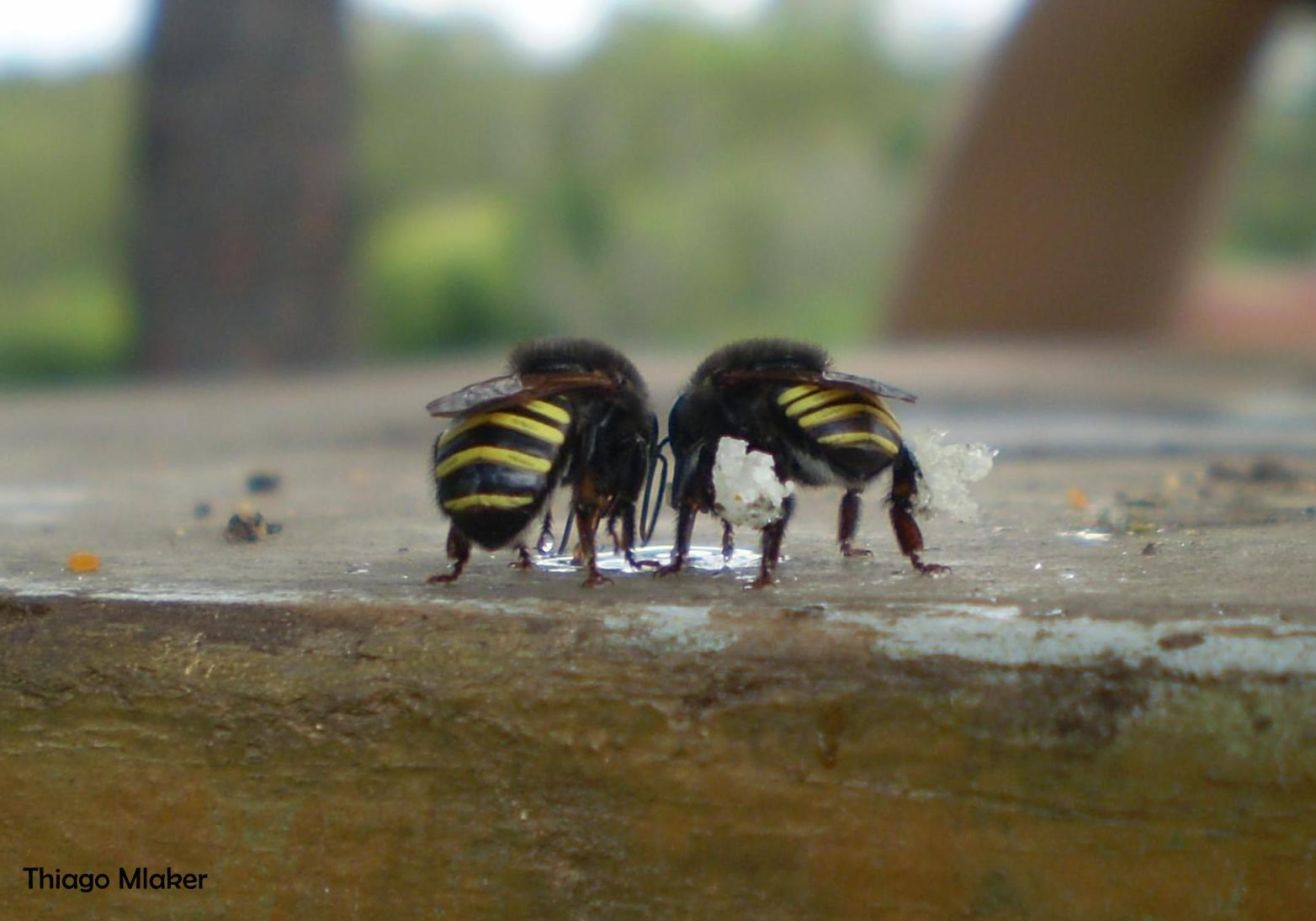

Conservation status
- Least Concern (IUCN 3.1)

Scientific classification
- Kingdom: Animalia
- Phylum: Arthropoda
- Clade: Pancrustacea
- Class: Insecta
- Order: Hymenoptera
- Family: Apidae
- Genus: Melipona
- Species: M. quadrifasciata

Binomial name
- Melipona quadrifasciata le Peletier, 1836
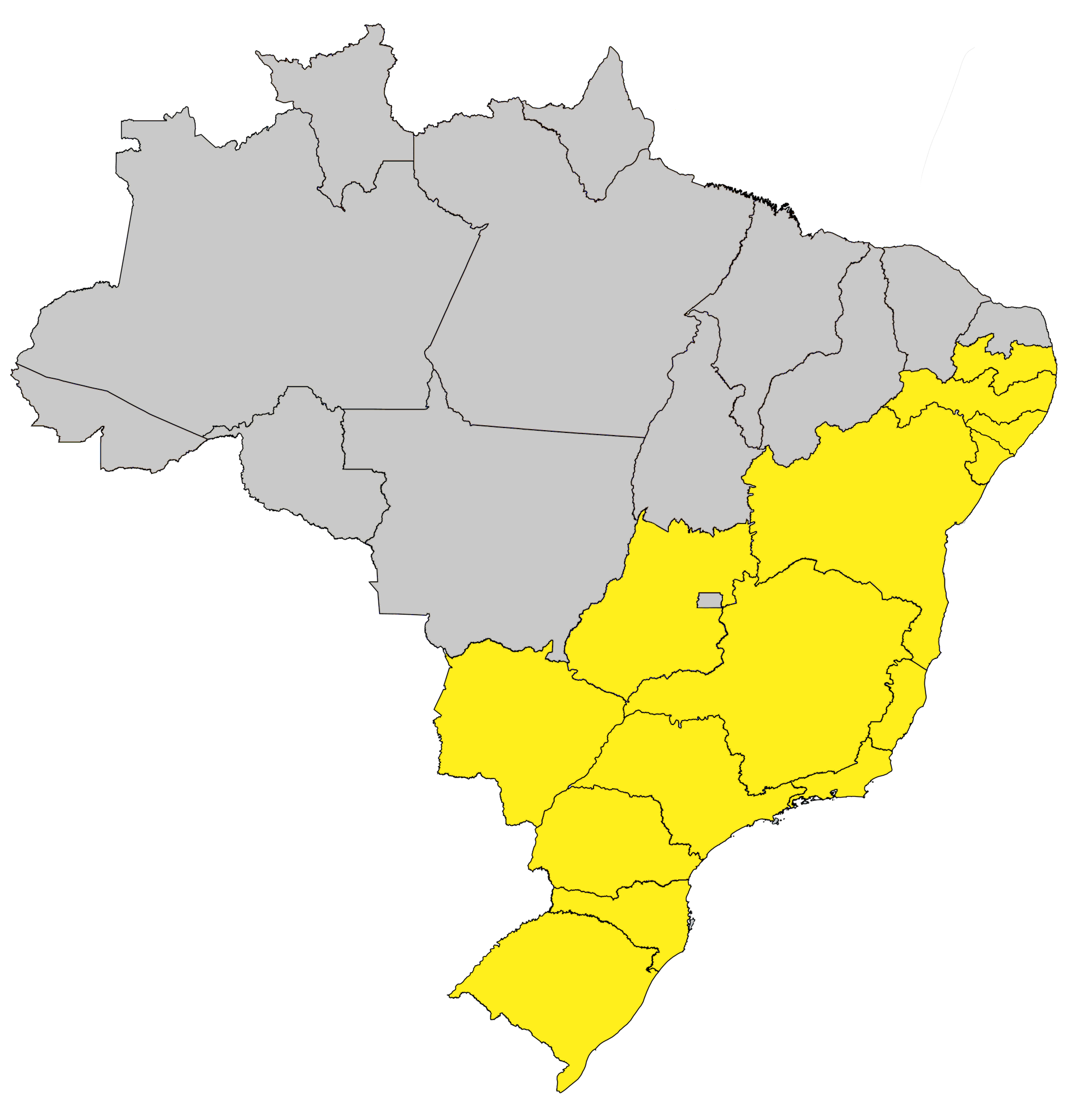
- Range of M. quadrifasciata in Brazil

= Melipona quadrifasciata =

Species of bee

Melipona quadrifasciata is a species of eusocial, stingless bee of the order Hymenoptera. It is native to the southeastern coastal states of Brazil, where it is more commonly known as mandaçaia, which means "beautiful guard," as there is always a bee at the narrow entrance of the nest. M. quadrifasciata constructs mud hives in the hollows of trees to create thin passages that only allow one bee to pass at a time. Because they are stingless bees, M. quadrifasciata are often used as pollinators in greenhouses, outperforming honey bees in efficiency and leading to overall larger yields of fruits that are heavier, larger, and contain more seeds.

== Taxonomy ==
Melipona quadrifasciata is a member of the family Apidae and the order Hymenoptera. M. quadrifasciata is in the subfamily Meliponini which is commonly referred to as "stingless bees". The genus Melipona includes nearly 50 other species. M. quadrifasciata can be categorized into two subspecies: M. quadrifasciata quadrifasciata which occupies the northern range of the species, and M. quadrifasciata anthidioides which are more often found in the southern range. However, there is a large hybrid area where the subspecies overlap.

== Identification and differentiation ==
Melipona quadrifasciata has dark black, rounded bodies with slightly curved antennae and translucent wings. Size is from 10 to 11 mm, and they are more heavily built than the common honeybee. This bee can be identified by the bright yellow stripe pattern from the third to the sixth abdominal tergites. Melipona that produce workers, males, and potential queens are indistinguishable and intermixed, making caste differentiation both environmentally and genetically determined.

=== Queens ===
The abdomens of M. quadrifasaciata queens swell with ovarian development, making older queens larger than workers, which is typical of most social bees. Queens vary slightly in their coloring, having brown eyes and brown hair compared to the black eyes and hair of worker bees.

=== Workers ===
Workers are smaller than the queen. Workers have black eyes and black hair on their thorax and abdomen. Older workers will go out foraging while younger workers, 12–21 days old, will construct and provision cells in the comb.

== Distribution and habitat ==
Melipona quadrifasciata is one of the most common Melipona species in southeastern coastal Brazil, found from the states of Pernambuco to Rio Grande do Sul. This species shows considerable variety in nesting sites and has been recorded nesting in tree trunks from 1 to 3 meters above the soil surface, in the soil in nests of Atta, and in the abandoned mud bird nests constructed on telephone poles. Nests are commonly found in tree holes and incorporate clay. The opening of the nests allows for only one bee to pass through at a time.

== Colony cycle ==
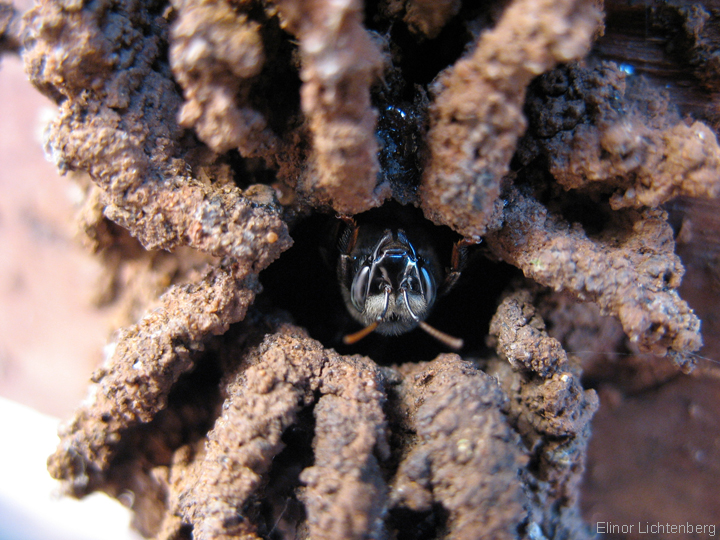
Nest entrance guard

Stingless bees, such as M. quadrifasciata, are highly eusocial bees that are characterized by having perennial colonies that are typically headed by a single-mated queen. The average number of adult workers and queens within a colony is 300–400. There has been a novel case of temporal polygyny within a colony of M. quadrifasciata, where eight egg-laying queens were found to be coexisting in a single colony.

New colonies are established in a slow process when the number of worker bees exceeds 500 or 600 individuals in the parent colony. Then, a number of worker bees start to build a new nest in a tree cavity found to be well suited for this purpose and store honey and pollen in there. When the new nest is ready, a "princess bee" (mated gyne) joins the workers, and if accepted it starts laying eggs and becomes the new queen. As in other Melipona bees, after a while the abdomen of the new queen expands to 3 or more times the initial size (a phenomenon called physogastrism) and it becomes incapable of flying, never leaving the nest again.

== Reproduction ==
This section contains information on cell construction, ovipositioning, and caste differentiation of M. quadrifasciata.

=== Cell construction ===
Young worker bees of the same age group are tasked with cell construction and provisioning of brood cells. An individual can participate in both cell building and provisioning. Each cell is not built exclusively and continuously by a single worker, but by successive activities by multiple workers. Cells are built in a concentric pattern and are finished successively, not synchronously, so at any given time there is diversity in each growing stage.

=== Worker oviposition ===
When a cell has been completed, the queen will fixate on the cell for inspection and push away workers from the cell. A worker will provision food into the cell and quickly retreat. Sometimes, when the queen is not around, a worker will lay an egg in the cell and quickly retreat from the area, similar to when provisioning cells. During worker oviposition, or egg laying, the worker will be quiet with her wings closed and keep her body completely still so as not to attract the queen. Worker oviposition will last an average of 7 seconds. A worker's egg is about 2/3 the size of eggs laid by the queen.

=== Queen oviposition ===
The queen briefly inspects the cell before inserting her metasoma. Usually, if a worker egg is found, it is eaten by the queen. The duration of queen oviposition is notably longer than worker oviposition, lasting an average of 24.5 seconds. After the queen has deposited an egg, there is usually a slight delay in M. quadrifasciata workers before operculation, or closing of the cell, occurs.

=== Caste differentiation ===
It has been found in Melipona quadrifasciata that caste determination is both genetic and environmental. Melipona cells which produce workers (and males) and those which produce gynes (young queens) are indistinguishable and intermixed. Upon emergence, gynes are around the same size as workers, although different structurally. Cells that receive small amounts of provisions produce workers, while cells with larger amounts produce both gynes and workers (KERR 1966). In research done by Kerr, Stort, and Montenegro (1966) it was found that no gynes occurred among pupae weighing less than 72 mg, while above that weight, around 25% of pupae were gynes. When all pupae are above 72 mg, a 3:1 segregation of workers to gynes is observed. In times when food is not adequate and pupae are of lower rate, fewer gynes develop.

The 3:1 ratio of workers to gynes provides evidence of genetic caste determination. To be a queen, a female must be heterozygous at two loci. Homozygosity at either or both loci produces an individual that becomes a worker. A potential queen, having double heterozygosity, can only become a queen if environmental conditions are good and ideal pupae weight can be achieved. A doubly heterozygous offspring will become a worker if food conditions are not favorable.

=== Queen supersedure ===
Potential queens, or gynes, are continually produced due to the genetic and trophic nature of caste differentiation. This provides a failsafe if a new queen is ever needed, however there must also be a device in place to dispose of the excess gynes. It is usually workers that kill excess gynes in Melipona species. However, at a time of queen supersedure in M. quadfrifasciata, several gynes will be killed before a newly accepted virgin queen helps the workers to deal with other virgin gynes that may emerge. After the newly accepted queen is established and the competition is disposed of, the new queen will take her mating flight.

=== Development ===
The full period of development for Melipona quadrifasciata is approximately 38 days; 5 days of embryonic development, 15-day larval stage, and an 18-day pupal stage.

== Communication ==
Melipona quadrifasciata is a highly eusocial bee, making communication imperative for the survival of the colony.

=== Forager recruitment ===
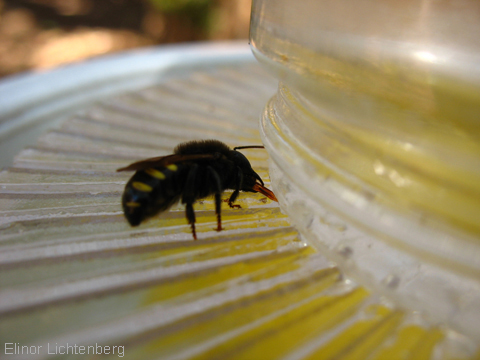
Drinking

Forager recruitment in stingless bees such as M. quadrifasciata is not as acute as in honey bees. In a series of experiments done at by the University of Vienna, it was confirmed that M. quadrifasciata were able to recruit other foragers within a colony and communicate the direction but not the distance of a foraging site. In comparison with other species of bee, M. quadrifasciata was not as great at communicating the location of a foraging site, but this could be due to the abundant and easily encountered food sources in its habitat in the forests of Brazil.

Similar to Melipona bicolor, M. quadrifasciata are mostly active outside of their nest in the morning, when humidity is high and light intensity and temperature are moderate. They forage for food in the first few hours of the morning.

== Relation to humans ==
Melipona quadrifasciata is commonly used in agriculture in South America, but wild bees are feeling the effects of deforestation and pesticides.

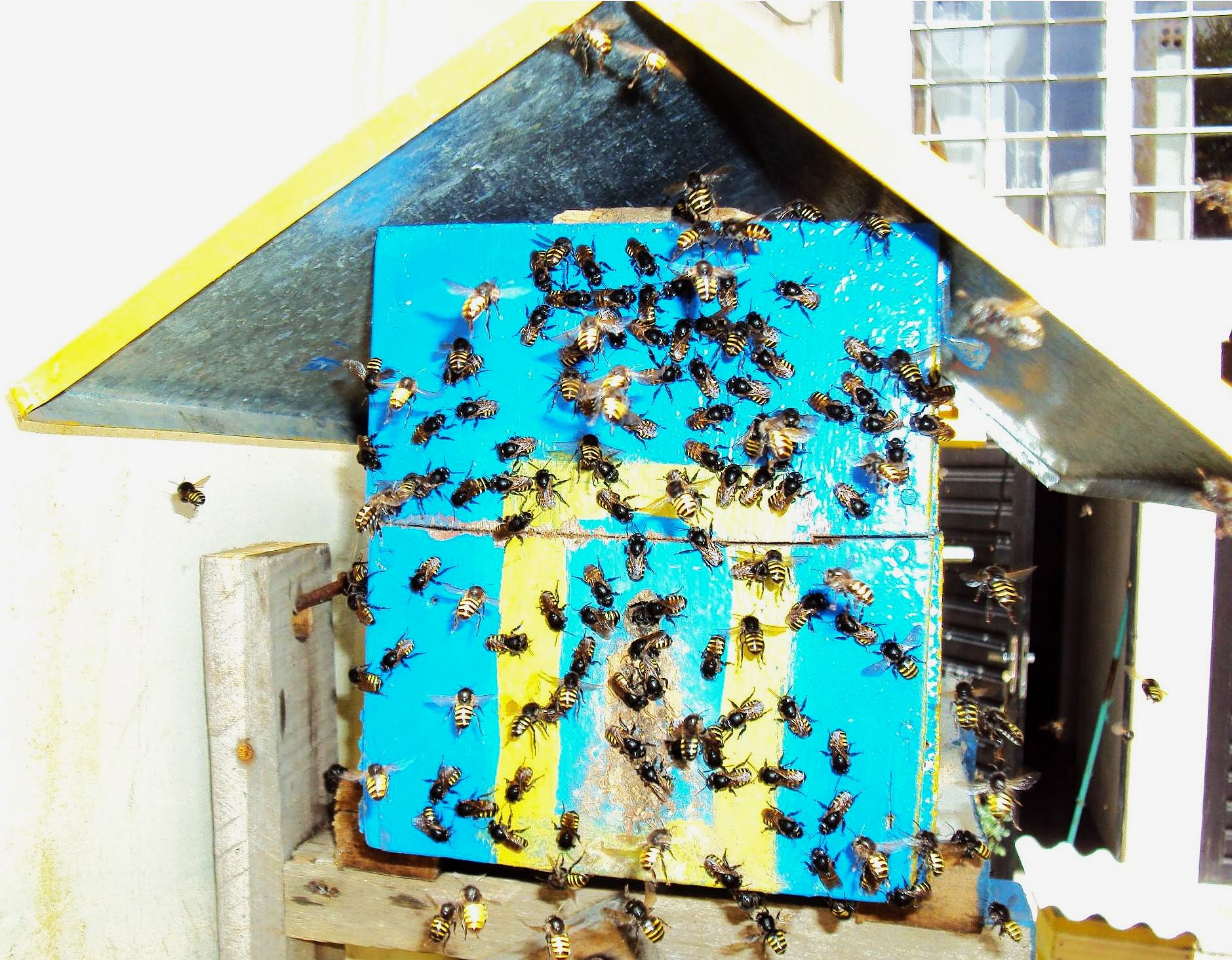
Melipona quadrifasciata hive

=== Greenhouse pollinators ===
The ancient Maya domesticated a separate species of stingless bee. The use of stingless bees is referred to as meliponiculture, named after bees of the tribe Meliponini—such as Melipona quadrifasciata in Brazil. This variation of beekeeping still occurs around the world today. M. quadrifasciata is frequently harvested to be used as a greenhouse pollinator because it is stingless and can easily live in man-made hives. M. quadrifasciata outperformed honey bees as greenhouse pollinators to yield fruits that were larger and carried more seeds than those pollinated by honey bees. The nests of M. quadrifasciata and other stingless bees of the Meliponini tribe are commonly used to harvest honey in Central and South America.

=== Beekeeping ===
This species is well suited for rational beekeeping, as colonies grant the introduction of new queens from other areas, allowing for exchange of queens between beekeepers in different regions of Brazil. Honey from M. quadrifasciata is produced sporadically in the Brazilian state of Bahia as an additional source of income. The honey is typically collected and sold by women, and in a good blooming season a single hive can produce 1 to 1.5 liters of honey. In warm regions honey is produced the whole year round, and production can be considerably higher. M. quadrifasciata honey is used both for consumption and medicinal purposes.

These bees are exceedingly tame, never attacking humans, even to defend their nest. Their normal reaction when the hive is opened is to hide in dark corners; usually they do not attempt to fly away. In strong colonies, a few workers may fly around the intruder, but will avoid touching it. This behavior greatly facilitates the work of beekeepers interested in raising them.

=== Deforestation ===
Cropland expansion and logging in the Brazilian cerrado has reduced the abundance of Meliponini bees. The fragmentation of habitat affects floral food sources and nesting sites. M. quadrifasciata seeks nesting sites in hollows of trees located a few meters up from the ground, creating a rather narrow niche. Only one species of tree in an area of the Brazilian cerrado is federally protected, Caryocar brasiliense, which is widely used by M. quadrifasciata for nesting.

=== Pesticide usage ===
Biopesticides are perceived as environmentally safe due to their natural origins. However, recent studies have shown lethal and sublethal risks to local pollinators as unintended consequences of biopesticide usage. M. quadrifasciata is an important native pollinator in Brazil, and was therefore used to study the effects of biopesticides on pollinators. It was found that the pesticides spinosad and imidacloprid—commonly used against crop pests—greatly impaired worker respiration, group activity, and flight in M. quadrifasciata.
