= Ptilotrigona =

Scientific classification
- Kingdom: Animalia
- Phylum: Arthropoda
- Clade: Pancrustacea
- Class: Insecta
- Order: Hymenoptera
- Family: Apidae
- Tribe: Meliponini
- Genus: Ptilotrigona; Moure, 1951

Genus of bees

Ptilotrigona is a genus of bees belonging to the family Apidae.

The species of this genus are found in South America.

Species:

- Ptilotrigona lurida (Smith, 1854)
- Ptilotrigona occidentalis (Schulz, 1904)
- Ptilotrigona pereneae (Schwarz, 1943)
