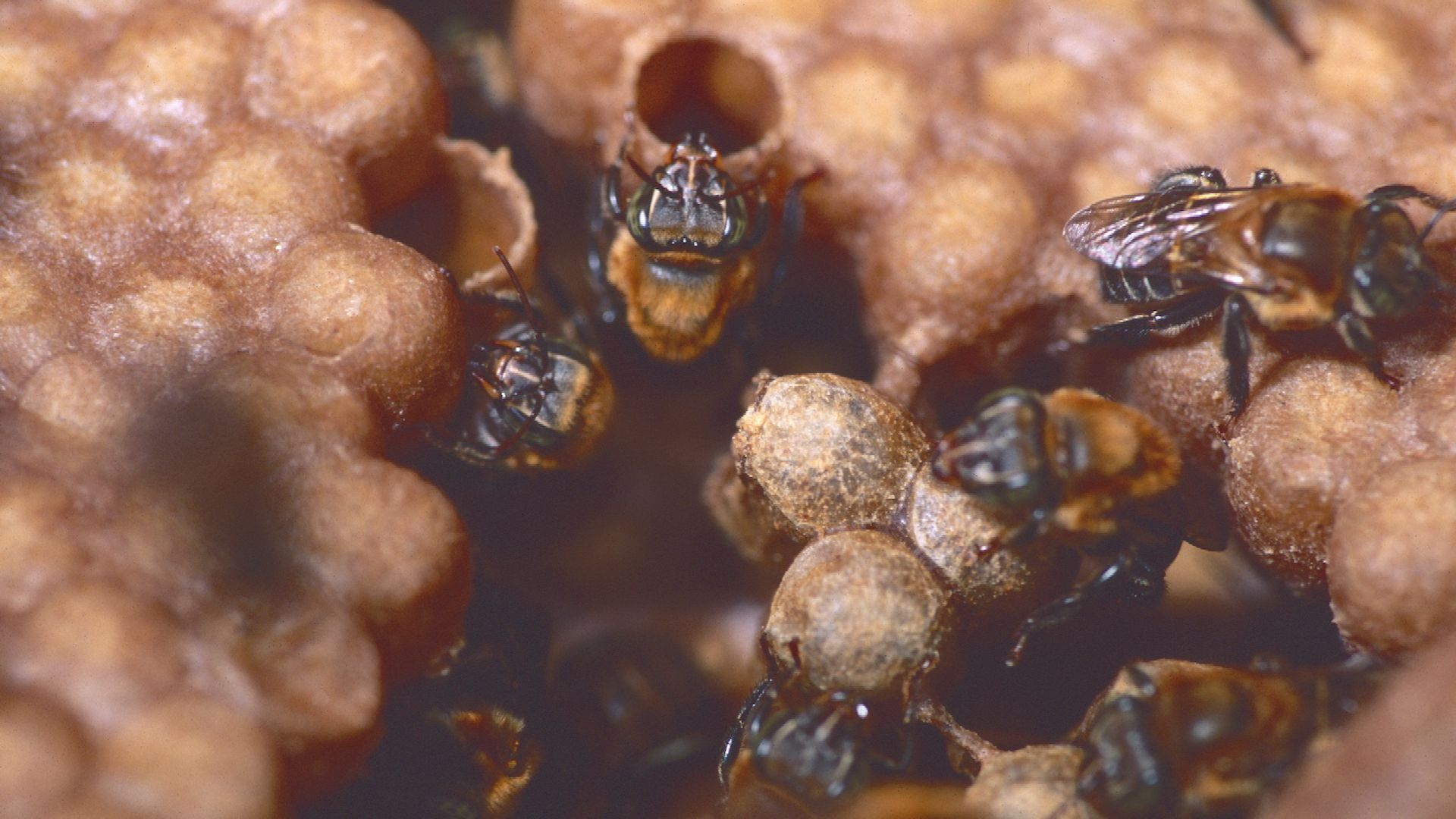
- M. bicolor workers in nest

Scientific classification
- Kingdom: Animalia
- Phylum: Arthropoda
- Class: Insecta
- Order: Hymenoptera
- Family: Apidae
- Genus: Melipona
- Species: M. bicolor

Binomial name
- Melipona bicolor Lepeletier, 1836
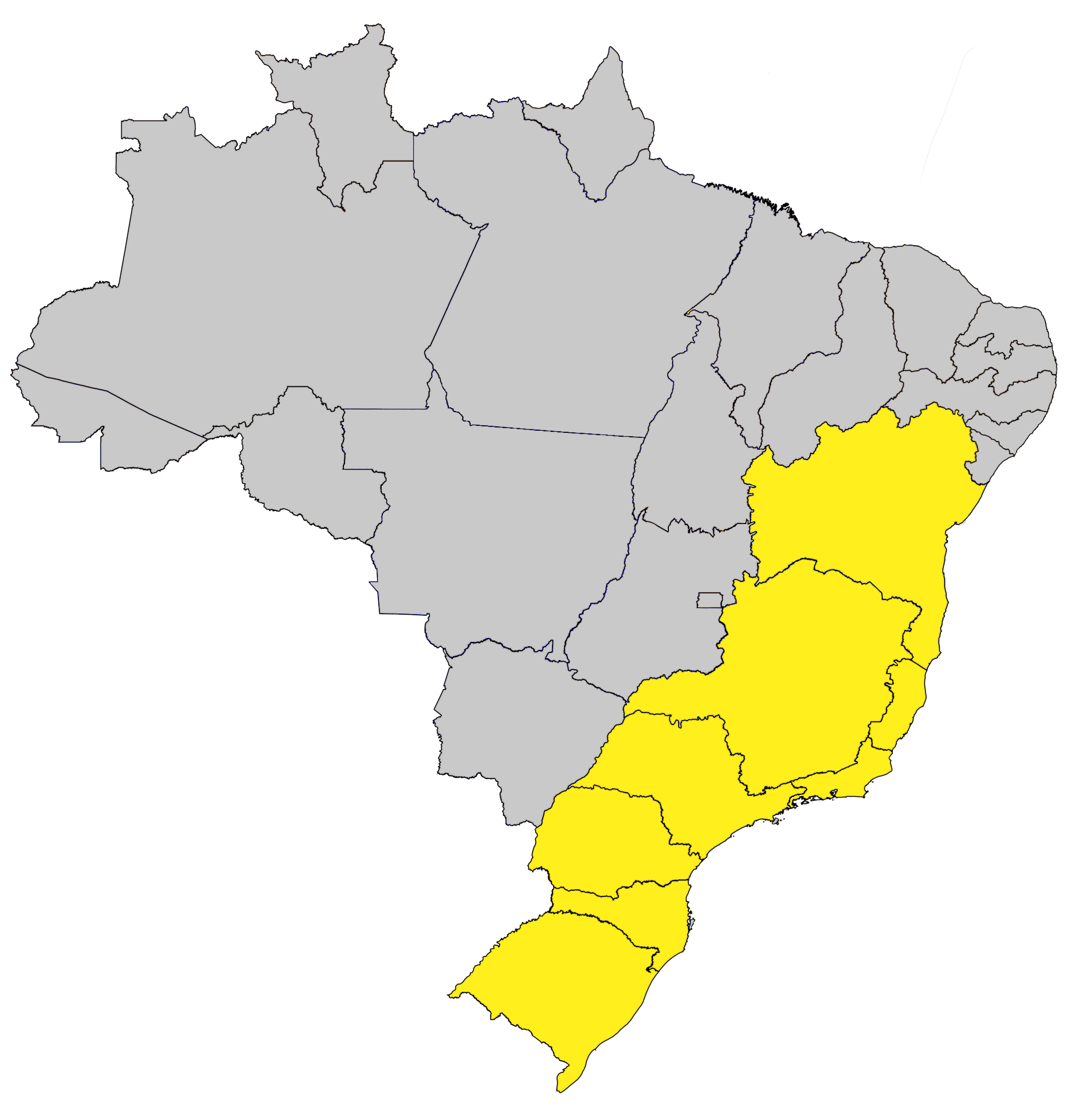
- Range of M. bicolor in Brazil

= Melipona bicolor =

Species of bee

Melipona bicolor Lepeletier, 1836, commonly known as Guaraipo or Guarupu, is a eusocial bee found primarily in South America. It is an inhabitant of the Araucaria Forest and the Atlantic Rainforest, and is most commonly found from South to East Brazil, Bolivia, Argentina, and Paraguay. It prefers to nest close to the soil, in hollowed trunks or roots of trees. M. bicolor is a member of the tribe Meliponini, and is therefore a stingless bee. This species is unique among the stingless bees species because it is polygynous, which is rare for eusocial bees.

== Taxonomy and phylogeny ==
M. bicolor belongs to the genus Melipona and the tribe Meliponini, which comprises about 500 species of stingless bees. Although they are called stingless, these bees do have a stinger, but it is extremely small and cannot be used for defense. M. bicolor is closely related to the other 40 known species in the genus Melipona.

== Description and identification ==
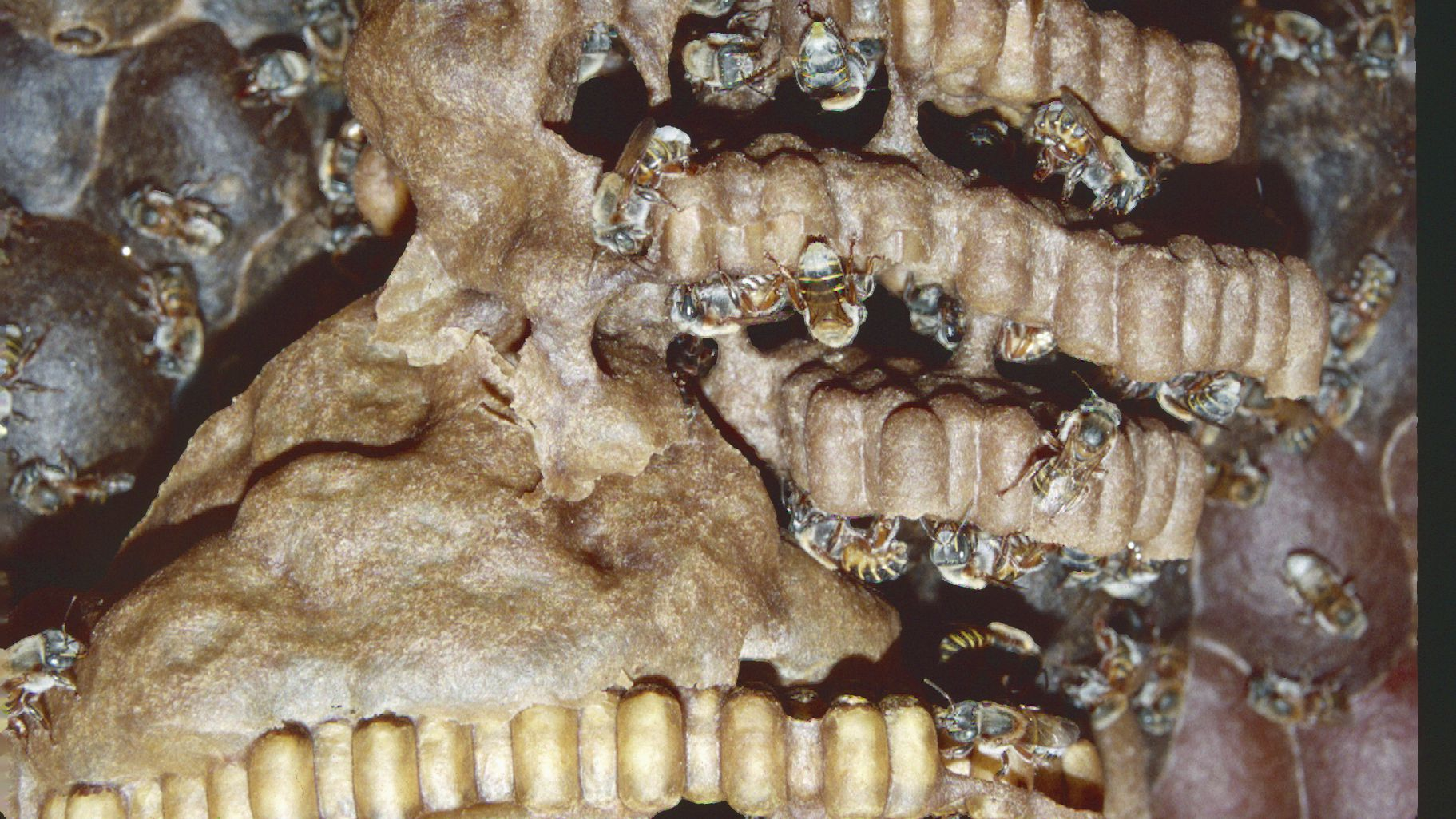
M. bicolor bees in the nest

M. bicolor is about 8 to 9mm long and have a stocky body. Coloration can vary from yellow to dark yellow. The males have either black or green eyes.

=== Nest structure ===
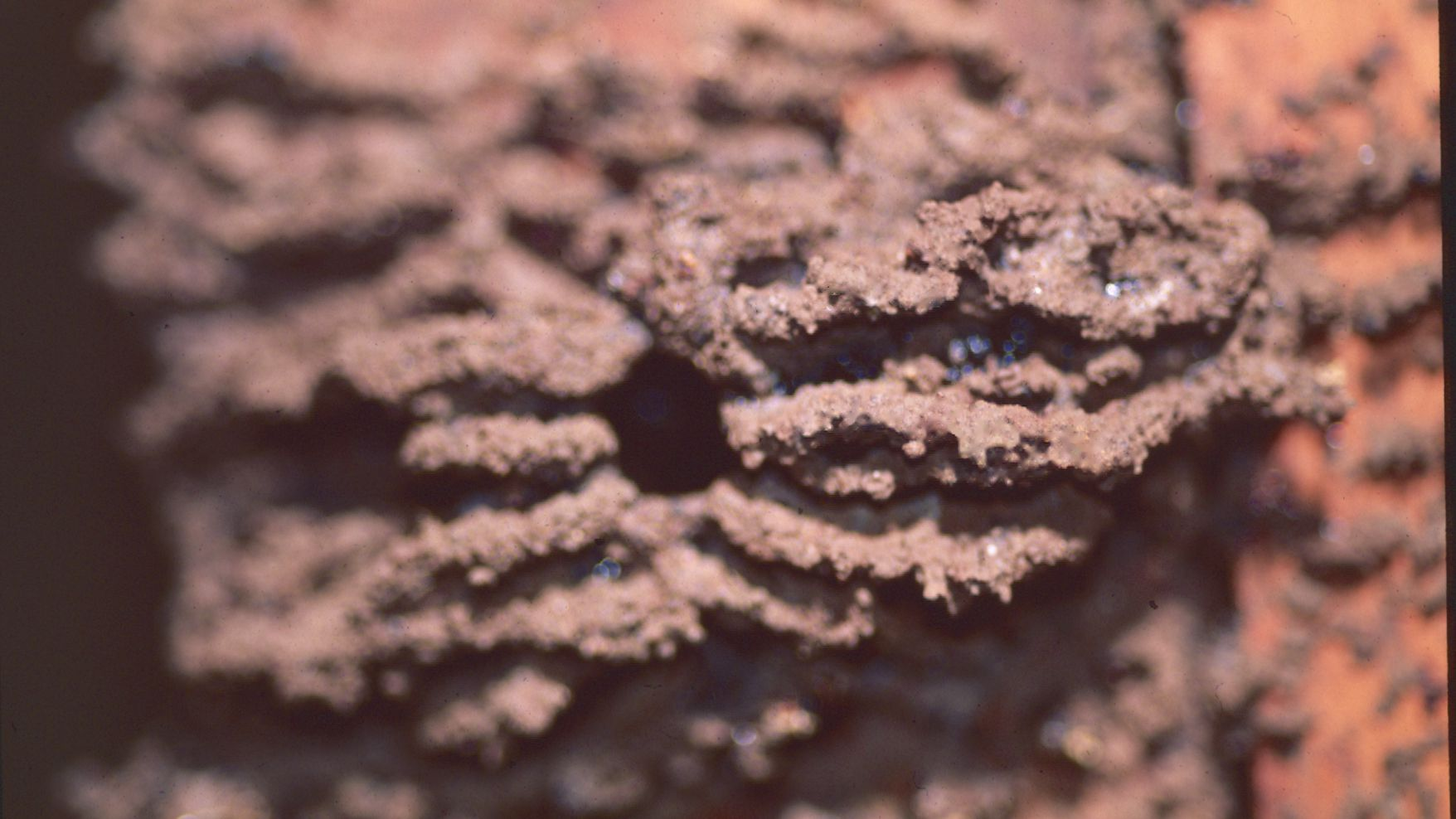
The entrance to a M. bicolor nest

As with all Melipona species, M. bicolor build well-protected nests inside pre-existing cavities. Their nests typically have a single entrance, which is long and narrow and penetrates deep into the nest. The nest cavity consists of two parts: a well-developed involucrum, surrounding a nest consisting of several layers of horizontally arranged combs, and outside the involucrum, which house a number of food pots. A significant amount of food can be stored in these pollen and honey pots. The pots can be large, getting as big as 4 cm in diameter. The pots sizes do vary with the state of the colony however.

==== Interior ====
Inside the nest, the brood combs are constructed sequentially; these combs are removed as soon as the brood emerges from the cells. M. bicolor engage in a process called Provision and Oviposition Process, or POP. This process encapsulates nest construction, mass provisioning, egg laying, and cell closure.

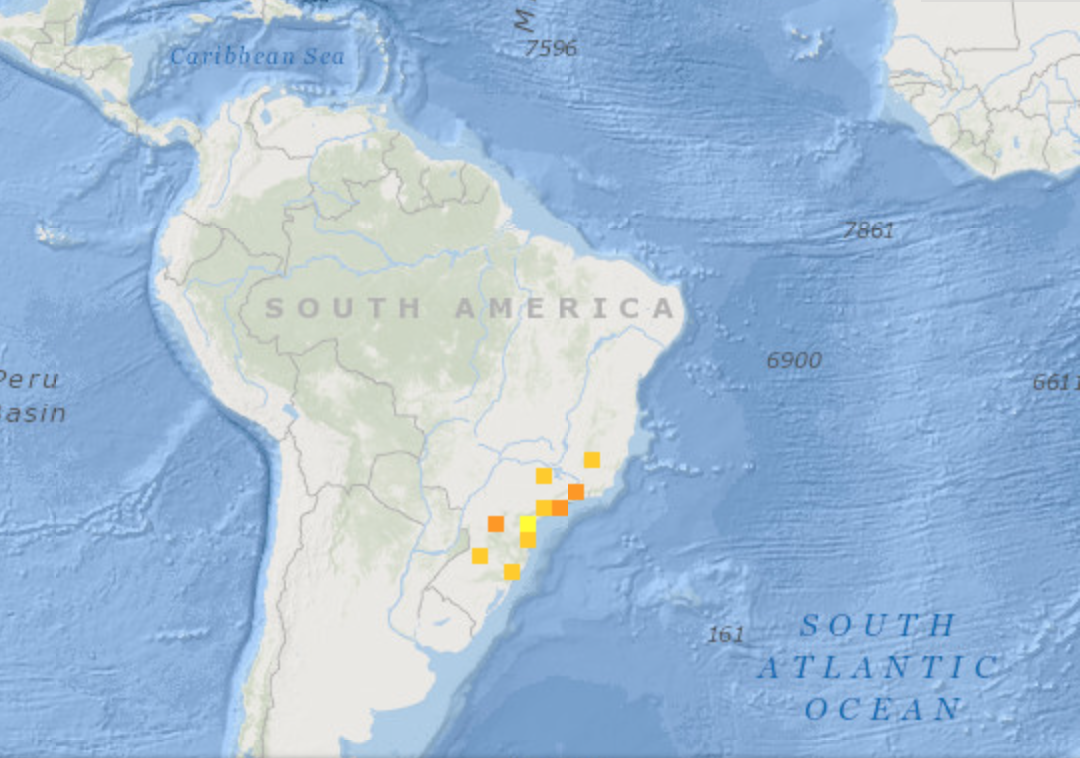
Distribution of M. bicolor

== Distribution and habitat ==
M. bicolor live predominantly in forests and rainforests in South America, particularly Brazil. They build their nests close to the soil, often in hollow roots or tree trunks. Although common in the past, they are now a relatively rare species due to the destruction of the rainforest in which these bees used to live, mainly because the growing of the cities and for agriculture.

The colonies of M. bicolor are very sensitive to the moisture level in the air, and cannot survive in dry areas. This is also the reason the nests are usually built in the lower and more humid part of tree trunks.

== Colony cycle ==
The queen lays her eggs during POP, and as with other Hymenoptera, the haplo-diploid system of sex determination makes it possible for the queen to choose whether to produce a male or female egg. This is possible due to the spermatheca, which permits or withholds sperm, to fertilize the egg as it passes along the oviduct. During POP, workers fill the cell with liquid food that is a mixture of pollen and nectar. After the cells are filled, the queen lays her egg on top of the liquid and the worker closes the cell. Once the eggs hatch, the larvae eat the food and pupate.

== Behavior ==
=== Division of labor ===
Common amongst eusocial bees, females make up the worker and queen populations. The workers are responsible for tasks including nest defense, brood care, colony maintenance, and provisioning. The queen influences the physiology and behavior of the workers, which are infertile females. The only role the males plays is in reproduction; his function is to mate with the queen and supply the necessary genetic complementation for reproduction.

=== Communication ===
==== Chemical signaling ====
In Melipona bees, there exists a precise system of chemical communication in order to maintain the organization of the various activities constantly being performed by individuals. This chemical communication is based on the production of pheromones, which are substances with intra-specific action. Numerous exocrine glands across the bee body produce these pheromones.

==== Sound signaling ====
Melipona bicolor also communicates through sound, particularly between foraging parties. As a member of the foraging party happens upon an area of high-quality food, it increases the length and frequency of emitted sounds in order to attract other members of the party towards the food source. The recruitment sounds also increase in duration as the distance to the food source increases. Sound production offers a way for members of a foraging party to communicate, even when out of site of each other, while maximizing the group's ability to acquire food.

=== Mating behavior ===
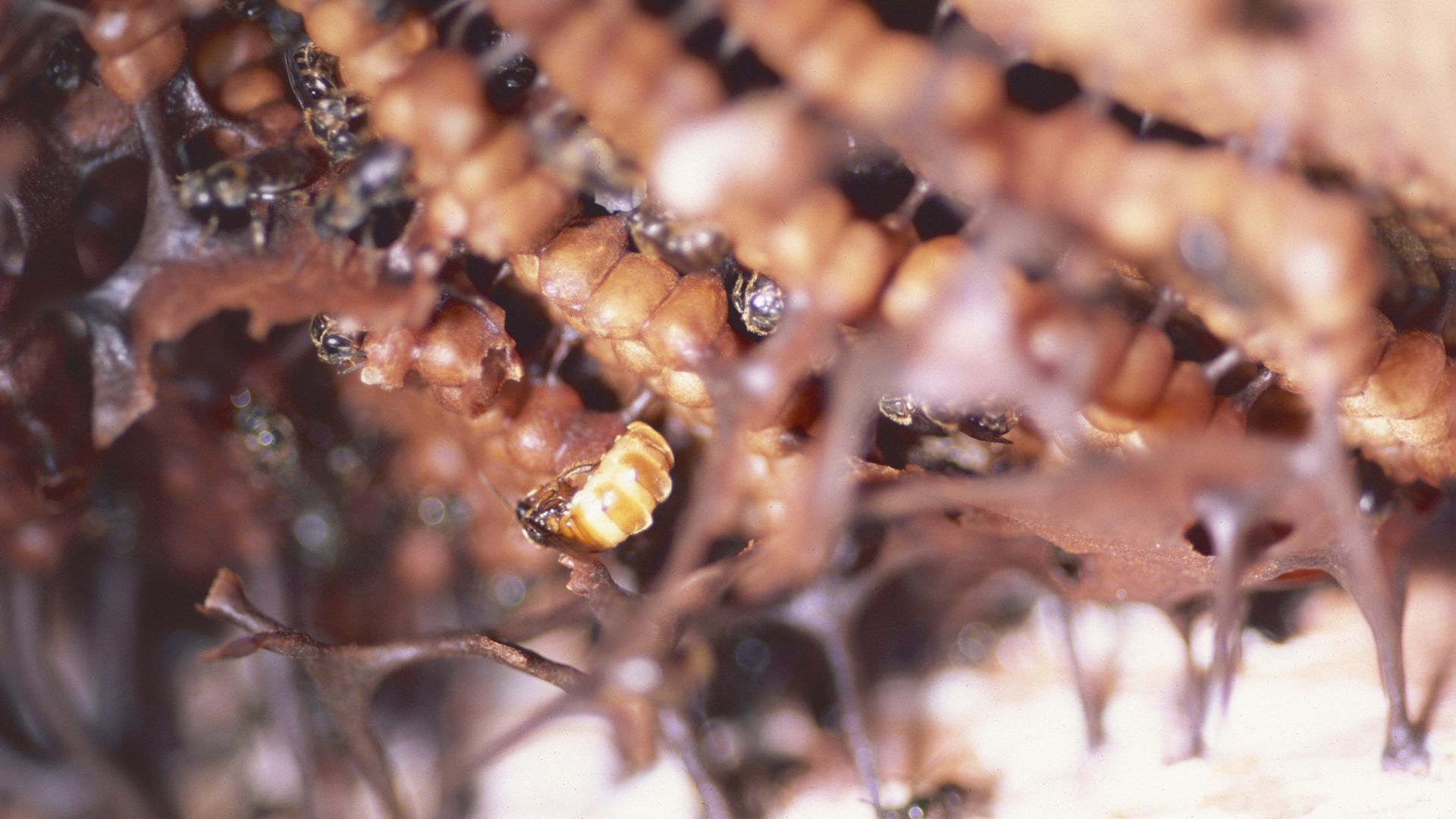
M. bicolor Queen

==== Queen bees ====
M. bicolor exhibits a rare case of mating amongst stingless bees. It is facultatively polygynous, meaning one or more physogastric queens can be found in the same colony. These queens interact with each other within the colony. They may rest together in a common court, and exhibit an interesting behavior when active. During the patrolling phase, a queen attempts to touch the abdomen of another queen. The other queen turns her abdomen away, and what follows is the two queens circling one another, trying to touch the other's abdomen. This circling behavior typically ends with the queens standing side by side with their heads toward the cell. In a polygnous colony, the queens are almost always in motion.

==== Virgin queens ====
Virgin queens are also tolerated in M. bicolor. They have not only been observed walking around the nest, but also standing close to one of the egg-laying queens during POP. This suggests a more egalitarian dominance relationship amongst the species.

==== Polygyny ====
There is an advantage to polygyny during situations where a colony must rapidly produce brood cells, such as during periods of food scarcity. Under these conditions, the queens are limited in their egg production and rely on the larval food from the brood cells. Polygyny allows for a greater production rate for the colony. It is speculated that alternating periods of significant flowering of food plants and food shortages are the ecological condition that favors polygyny.

=== Flight activity ===
M. bicolor are mostly active outside of their nest in the morning, when humidity is high and light intensity and temperature are moderate. They forage for food in the first few hours of the morning, a trend similar to that of the species Melipona quadrifasciata. However, they tend to collect mud and resin mostly in twilight. Further, they typically exit the nest with debris during the first hours of the morning, and again at twilight. Temperature is the most important environmental factor concerning the external activity of Melipona bees. M. bicolor also exhibit greater flight activity when the relative humidity is high. This may because of their habitats of high humidity, and being accustomed to fog. The strength of the colony also affects the times when the workers are most active.

== Kin selection ==
=== Worker–queen conflict ===
In some cases, workers of many species of stingless bees, including M. bicolor are able to lay eggs and produce male offspring. M. bicolor worker bees can lay two morphologically distinct type of eggs: some have a patterned chorion, and others are unpatterned. If the worker lays an unpatterened egg, she typically leaves the cell, which gives the queen the ability to eat this egg. However, sometimes workers lay patterned eggs after the brood cell is filled with food, and quickly close the cell right after. The worker could lay these eggs either before the queen has oviposited, or soon after, which would result in two eggs in the same brood cell. If the queen does not eat the eggs, the worker typically succeeds in producing male offspring.

== Interaction with other species ==
=== Predators ===
The predators for M. bicolor include many of the same predators for other Meliponini species, such as birds, lizards, spiders, and mammals such as tayras and kinkajous. Since they are a species of stingless bee, they do not have a great defense against predators.

=== Diet ===
M. bicolor is polylectic, meaning the species gathers pollen from many different species of flowering plants. However, they prefer pollen from Myrtaceae, Melastomataceae, and Solanaceae. While sex determination in Melipona is genetic, food plays a vital role as it can maximize the queens' production. Excess pollen is harvested during the winter, which allows the colony to produce more larval food.

== Human importance ==
=== Agriculture ===
M. bicolor produces a honey similar to most Melipona bees species, which is distinct from Apis honey, and is thus frequently reared by meliponine beekeepers. But this is not as common as with the species from the Amazon region, where M. bicolor bees are not found. That region has great potential for production of stingless bee honey; with the recent initiatives towards sustainable development of the Amazon rain forest, the production of honey is bound to increase.

Since M. bicolor is a very tame species of stingless bee, they are great for beekeeping. Each colony can produce about 2 liters of a tasteful honey for season, or even more in warm regions.
