= Tetragona quadrangula =

Scientific classification
- Kingdom: Animalia
- Phylum: Arthropoda
- Class: Insecta
- Order: Hymenoptera
- Family: Apidae
- Genus: Tetragona
- Species: T. quadrangula

Binomial name
- Tetragona quadrangula (Lepeletier, 1836)

Species of bee

Tetragona quadrangula, also called borá-de-chão ("ground borá" bee) in Brazil, is a species of eusocial stingless bee in the family Apidae and tribe Meliponini. It is endemic to Brazil.
