= Cleptotrigona =

Scientific classification
- Kingdom: Animalia
- Phylum: Arthropoda
- Class: Insecta
- Order: Hymenoptera
- Family: Apidae
- Clade: Corbiculata
- Tribe: Meliponini
- Genus: Cleptotrigona; Moure, 1961
- Species: C. cubiceps

Binomial name
- Cleptotrigona cubiceps (Friese, 1912)

Synonyms
- Trigona cubiceps Friese, 1912; Lestrimelitta cubiceps Friese, 1912; Lestrimelitta cubiceps (Friese); Trigona curriei Cockerell, 1917; Lestrimelitta curriei (Cockerell); Cleptotrigona curriei (Cockerell)

Genus of African stingless bees

Cleptotrigona is a monotypic genus of cleptoparasitic stingless bee, represented by its only species Cleptotrigona cubiceps, sometimes referred to as the African robber bee. It is found in Africa.

== Description ==
The worker of Cleptotrigona cubiceps is a very small, dark brown to black stingless bee, with a body length of 3.5–4.0 mm. It lacks a pollen basket (corbicula) and the associated penicillum. The head is relatively large and shiny, and the scutum has a black, velvety vestiture. The mandible has one or two anterior teeth and one large posterior tooth. The forewing has two closed cells and a distinct radial sector (Rs) vein.

== Distribution and ecology ==
Cleptotrigona cubiceps is found in Sub-Saharan Africa, with records from Uganda, Cameroon, Kenya, South Africa, Angola, Tanzania, and Liberia. It is a kleptoparasite, invading the nests of other stingless bees to lay its eggs. It is believed to parasitize bees of the genera Hypotrigona and probably Liotrigona.
