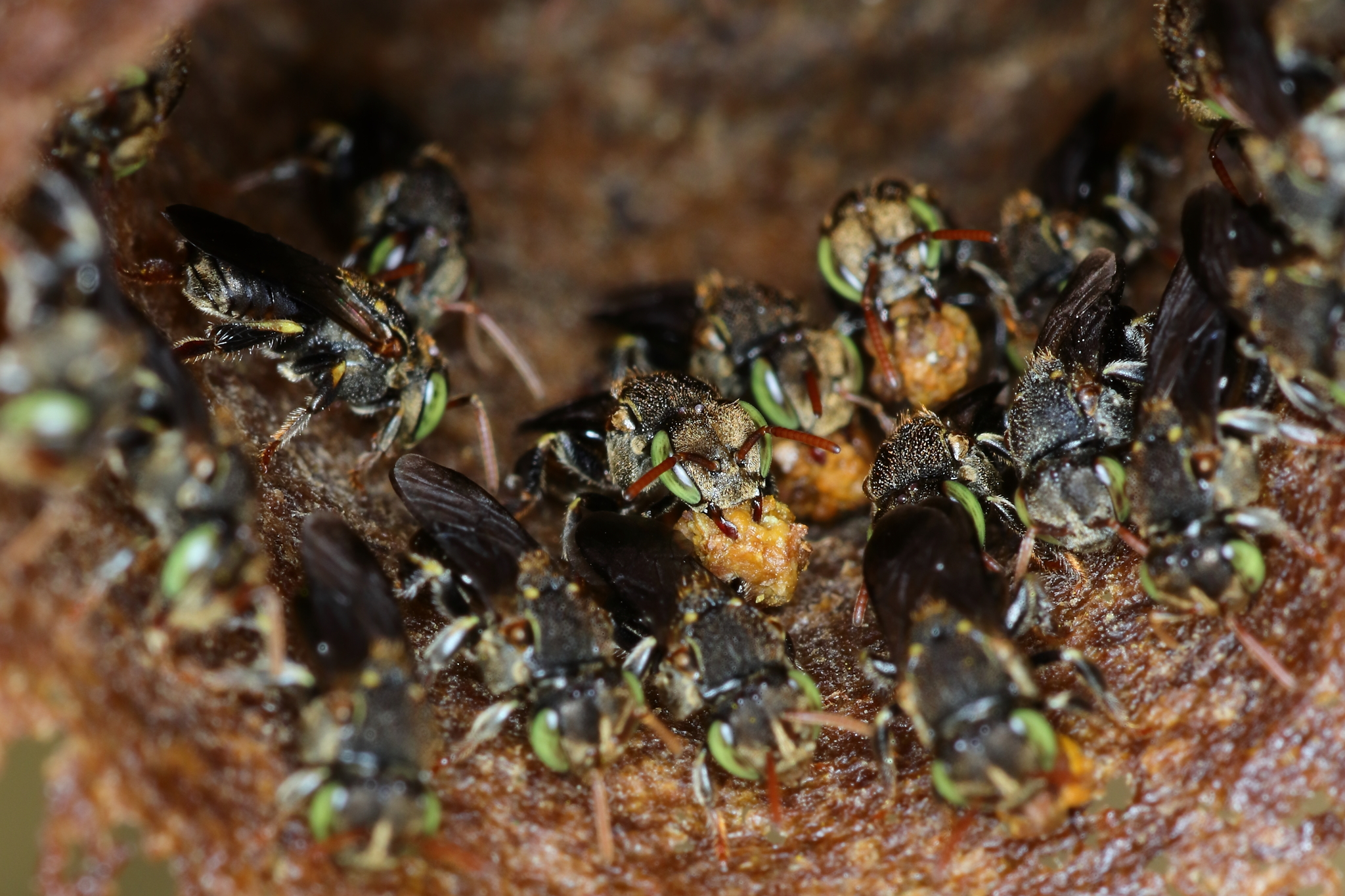
- N. testaceicornis at their hive entrance

Scientific classification
- Domain: Eukaryota
- Kingdom: Animalia
- Phylum: Arthropoda
- Class: Insecta
- Order: Hymenoptera
- Family: Apidae
- Genus: Nannotrigona
- Species: N. testaceicornis

Binomial name
- Nannotrigona testaceicornis le Peletier, 1836
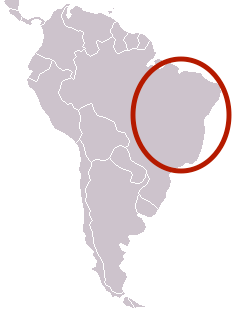
- Range of N. testaceicornis

= Nannotrigona testaceicornis =

Species of bee

Nannotrigona testaceicornis is a eusocial stingless bee species of the order Hymenoptera and the genus Nannotrigona. Its local common name is abelhas iraí. This species has a large geographic distribution and occupies different biomes, including urban areas, around Neotropical America. The bees of this species nest in trees or artificial cavities because of this broad distribution. N. testaceicornis is important for agriculture because it will pollinate a vast number of plant species year round.

== Taxonomy ==
Nannotrigona testaceicornis is a member of the family Apidae of eusocial bees within the order Hymenoptera. The subfamily Meliponini is commonly referred to as "stingless bees." The genus Nannotrigonna has about nine known species and ranges from Sonora, Chihuahua, and San Luis Potosí, Mexico, to Santa Catarina, Brazil, and Paraguay.

== Description ==
Nannotrigona testaceicornis bees are black and generally have grey hairs with a coarse and wrinkled thorax. Along with the rest of the genus Nannotrigonis, they are about 3 to 5 millimeters long. There is much variation within the species genotype, leading to variation in the venation of the wings. Colonies consist of about 2000 to 3000 individuals. Nests are made in tree cavities or in artificial sites, and the brood cells are in combs. The nest entrances are rather large for such small bees and are usually lined by workers looking outward. These openings are in contrast to the entrances of many other small Meliponini which are so small that one or a few workers can block them.

== Distribution and habitat ==
Nannotrigona testaceicornis is a neotropical eusocial bee that has a large geographic distribution, primarily throughout Brazil. It can occupy various different biomes, including urban areas. Due to this variability, different genomes can occur within the species according to the conditions of the biome. This can be seen mostly in the N. testaceicornis patterns of wing venation. Because of their occupation of urban areas, N. testaceicornis can live in self-made and artificial hives. Most stingless bees construct their nests in pre-existing cavities using several types of materials. N. testaceicornis often use artificial cavities from human constructions to build their nests. The constant presence of N. testaceicornis in the human environment promotes competition for nesting places, leading to intensified aggressive interactions between colonies within the species.

== Colony cycle ==
Caste determination in stingless bees is more variable than in honey bees. In Melipona, queens may be reared in both royal cells and small cells. Ones reared in small cells are smaller than normal queens, since they emerge from brood cells in which normally only workers and males are reared. Just like normal queens, miniature queens can successfully mate and head colonies. Queens and workers are produced in identically sized cells, and are typically produced in great excess of colony needs.

Nannotrigona testaceicornis have low investments in queens similar to those of species that rear their queens only in royal cells. The production of miniature queens can be explained by the caste conflict hypothesis. It assumes that selfish females reared in normal-sized cells become queens, instead of workers, because they have direct benefits in reproduction. If the mated queen dies during reproductive diapause, there are new queens in the nest available to be selected by workers. The selected miniature queen can mate and replace the dead one, assuring the future of the colony.

== Abdominal extracts ==
Abdominal extracts are differentiated between males and workers, but both come from the Dufour's gland, which is a large, wide, pear-shaped sac. The main chemical component of workers' abdominal extract is geranylgeranyl acetate while the extract from males' abdomens is (Z)-9-nonacosene. Experiments have shown that (S)-(+)-2-heptanol and (S)-(+)-2heptanol/(S)-(+)-2-nonanol (1:1) attract N. testaceicornis workers. However, males do not respond to these chemicals, implying that these compounds do not function as alarm or recruitment pheromones.

== Behavior ==
=== Communication ===
A zigzag run and the jostling of nestmates inside the nest as well as airborne sounds and vibrational signals are observed as communication methods for N. testaceicornis, rather than a scent trail. Both the vibrations and the jostling by the workers stimulate the nestmates to leave the nest and search for food. Depending on the profitability of the food source, workers will adjust their activity to recruit more or less nestmates. When a worker has been successful in finding a food source, it will return to the nest and begin bumping into nestmates and will stop for trophallaxis emitting thorax vibrations and airborne sounds, which can even be heard by the human ear.

=== Role differentiation ===
Female N. testaceicornis will have two sets of chromosomes (diploid), receiving one set from the queen and the other from a male drone. Meanwhile, drones have one set of chromosomes (haploid), resulting from an unfertilized egg. The worker N. testaceicornis will primarily act as guards of the nest and search for food while the drones and queen stay inside the nest.

=== Caste determination ===
Caste determination in stingless bees is still not fully understood. There are two main theories of determination, and there is not enough conclusive data to establish which one is correct for N. testaceicornis.

One theory stipulates that female larvae have the potential of following diverse pathways in development. Workers build royal cells for queen, but queens may also emerge from normal cells where males and workers emerge from. The queens in royal cells contain more food for the larvae, while the normal cells do not. In the normal cells, the larvae ingest less food and are therefore of smaller size and labeled as “miniature” or “dwarf” queens.

The other theory formulates that during development, female larvae have the decision of becoming a worker or a queen and therefore have the power of self-determination. The miniature queens would still gain a higher pay-off being a small queen rather than a worker since they then have the potential to be selected by the workers as the next queen when the active queen dies.

=== Interspecies aggression ===
During a dispute, a swarm from one colony of N. testaceicornis will form a cloud of individuals near the active colony. A few individuals in the swarm will fly in the direction of the tube entrance of the active colony's nest, where they are met by the active colony’s guards. The attempted invasion promotes the formation of groups of two to four swarm and resident bees to fall to the ground and continue to fight until death. The active colony’s nest entrance will then be closed off by the residents. The failing swarm of N. testaceicornis will change their strategy and occupy an abandoned nest.

=== Sociality ===
Nannotrigona testaceicornis defend by biting their predators and gather in large colonies of 2000 to 3000 individuals due to the lack of a toxic stinger. The more individuals in a colony, the more guards the colony has to watch the nest. In the day time, these guards will take shifts to block the entrance of the nest from unrelated individuals. At night, the guards will then seal the cerumen tube entrance.

== Importance to humans ==
=== Historical significance ===
Nannotrigona testaceicornis was the first Meliponini whose communication about food sources was proven. Numerous people had noted the sudden appearance of large numbers of stingless bees on sweets that had been exposed without attracting bees, and therefore assumed communication. In 1953, W. E. Kerr put a dish of sugar syrup a few meters from a series of nests of N. testaceicornis. No bees found it until one worker was taken to the dish and allowed to return to its hive, more and more bees arrived at the dish over time. These bees were also found to be inhabitants of a single hive.

=== Agriculture ===
Nannotrigona testaceicornis, along with other stingless bees, are used as crop pollinators in greenhouses, especially during the winter season. They have been discovered to be polylectic, collecting pollen from the flowers of a variety of unrelated plants, making then great pollinators.
