= Tetragona goettei =

Scientific classification
- Kingdom: Animalia
- Phylum: Arthropoda
- Class: Insecta
- Order: Hymenoptera
- Family: Apidae
- Genus: Tetragona
- Species: T. goettei

Binomial name
- Tetragona goettei (Friese, 1900)

Species of bee

Tetragona goettei, known as borá-mansa in Brazil, is a species of eusocial stingless bee in the family Apidae and tribe Meliponini.
