= Tetragona clavipes =

Scientific classification
- Kingdom: Animalia
- Phylum: Arthropoda
- Class: Insecta
- Order: Hymenoptera
- Family: Apidae
- Genus: Tetragona
- Species: T. clavipes

Binomial name
- Tetragona clavipes (Fabricius, 1804)

Species of bee

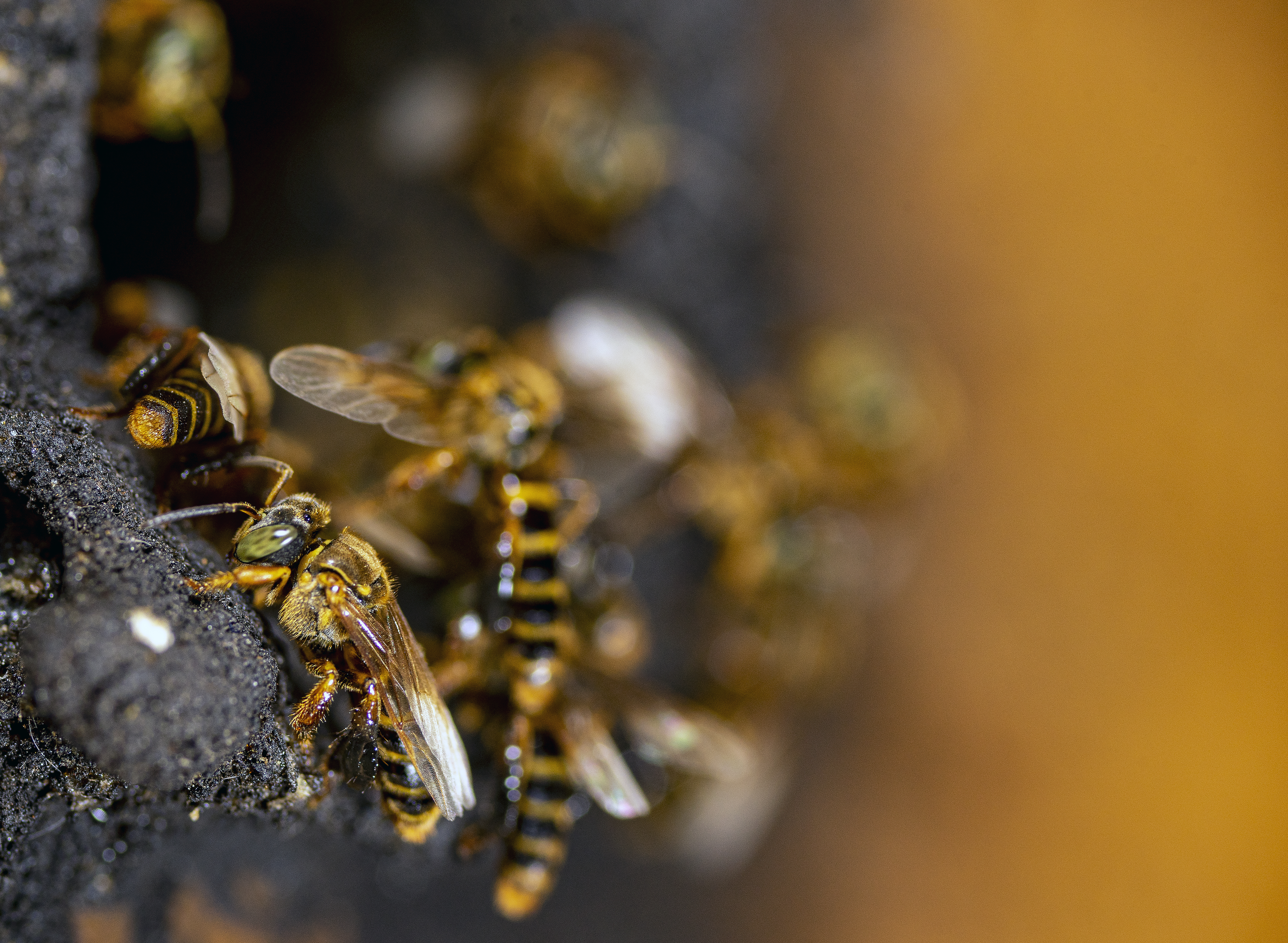
Tetragona clavipes

Tetragona clavipes, called borá or vorá in Brazil, is a species of eusocial stingless bee in the family Apidae and tribe Meliponini. In Brazil, it has been recorded in the northern state of Roraima.
