= Lakes380 =

New Zealand research programme

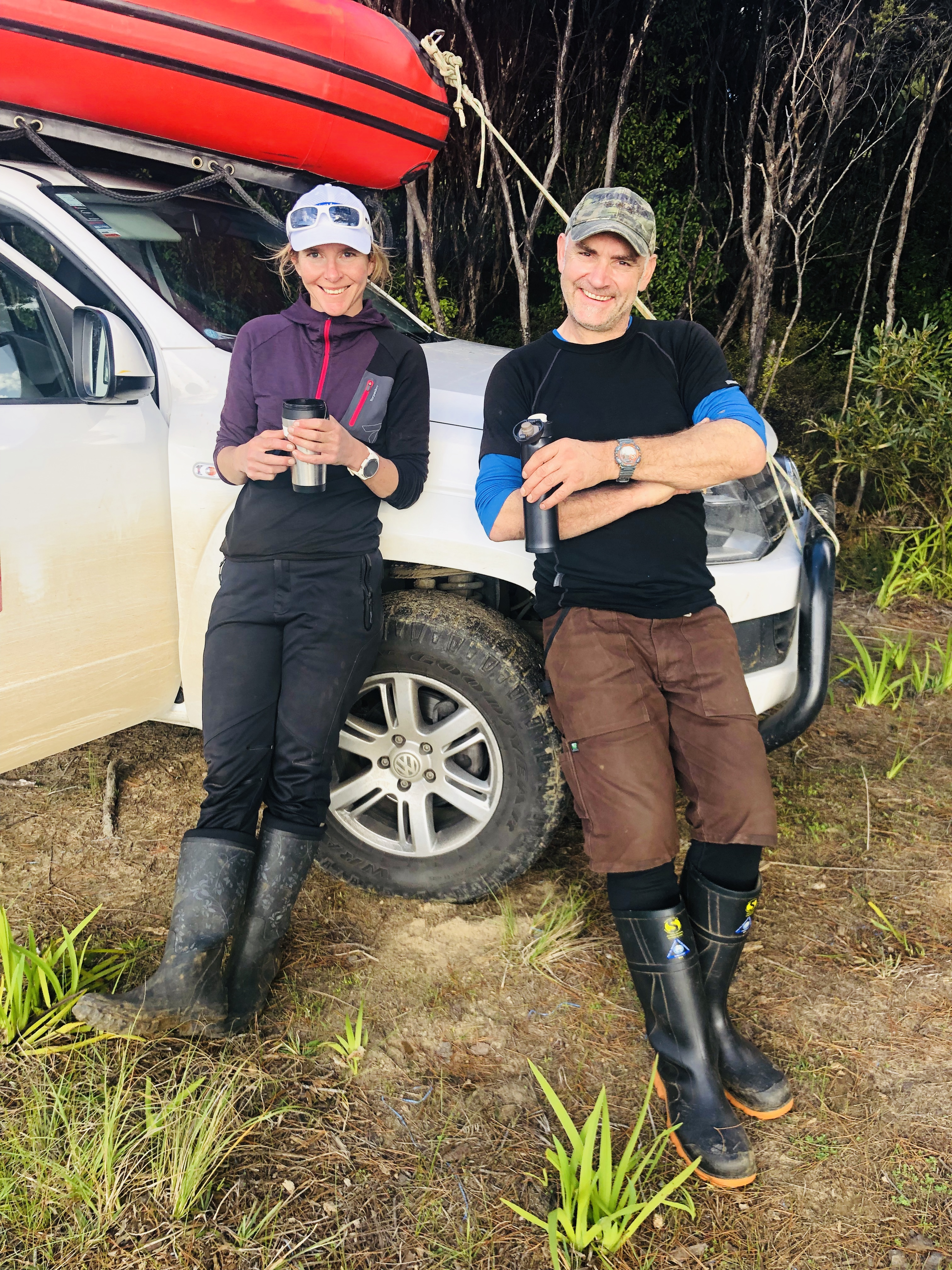
- Lakes380 co-leads Susie Wood (Cawthron) and Marcus Vandergoes (GNS Science)
- Project type: Collecting and analysing lake sediments and water samples, as well as interviews and field visits.
- Funding agency: Ministry of Business, Innovation and Employment (MBIE)
- Location: New Zealand regions
- Project coordinator: Marcus Vandergoes GNS Science, (Lakes380 programme co-leader); Susie Wood Cawthron Institute, (Lakes380 programme co-leader)
- Duration: 2017 – 2022
- Website: lakes380.com

Lakes380 – Our Lakes' Health: past, present, future is a New Zealand limnology research project focussed on determining the health, wellness and history of about 10 per cent of New Zealand's 3800 lakes, by collecting surface water, sediment samples and sediment cores and using many different techniques including environmental DNA (eDNA), and other core scanning methods to analyze them. By drawing on both traditional Māori knowledge and biophysical science, it was intended to provide a public resource to assist the development of restoration and management plans for these lakes. The project is jointly led by GNS Science and the Cawthron Institute and works with a wide range of New Zealand and international participants and partners. It was initially a five-year (2017–2022) programme, funded by an Endeavour Fund grant from the Ministry of Business, Innovation and Employment.

== Description ==
In the "Public Statement", as part of the funding application, it was noted that there was a lack of scientific knowledge about the health of approximately 95% of New Zealand lakes and an effective way to gain information would be to examine sediment cores to uncover their environmental history using the latest techniques such as eDNA and high-resolution scanning. The data would characterise current lake health, explore rates and drivers of change over the last 1000 years and provide a deeper understanding to inform the restorations of the ecological vitality of the lakes.

It was proposed that the data from this project would be used by "government agencies to undertake strategic assessments of water quality and health risk, prioritise mitigation strategies, characterise biodiversity, assess the distribution and impact of invasive species, and inform environmental policy. Regional councils, iwi/hapū and other communities will use this new knowledge to assist in setting informed and achievable restoration aspirations".

The project acknowledged the importance of building a close working relationship with iwi and hapū, drawing on the knowledge of Māori as a result of their historical relationships with the lakes.

== Research team ==
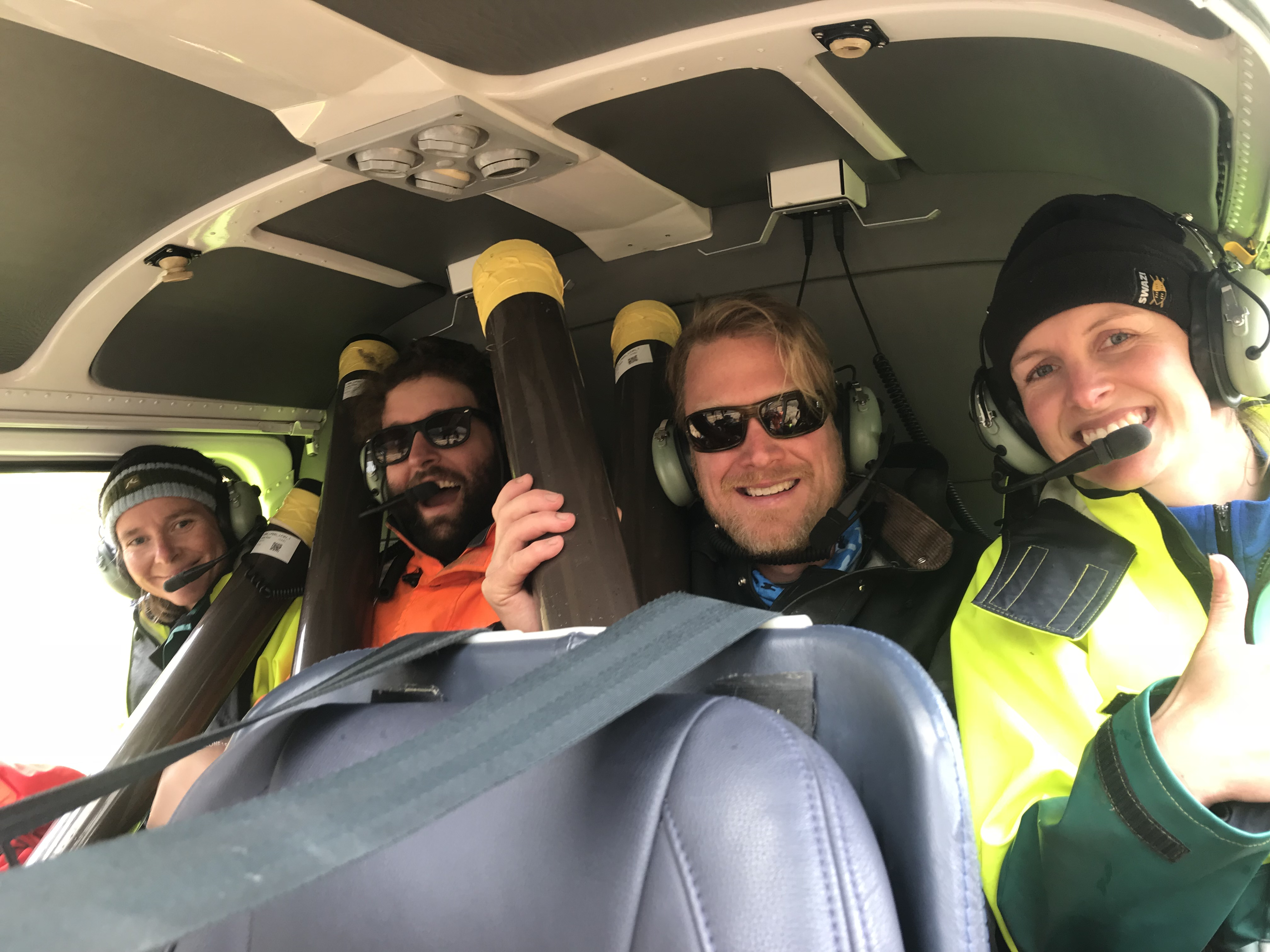
Lakes380 team Lake Peel Kahurangi National Park

The team is co-led by Susie Wood (Cawthron Institute) and Marcus Vandergoes (GNS Science) and has experts with a range of scientific expertise from universities and research organisations in New Zealand and overseas. It is supported by a Science, Advice and Implementation Group to provide guidance on strategy, quality and performance and prioritization of research directions. The project also has national and international collaborators and is in partnership with over 20 New Zealand organisations.

== Aims ==
- Obtain a nationwide health overview for about 10% (380) of New Zealand's lakes.
- Collaborate with iwi and hapū to learn from their knowledge of the lakes to inform "joint aspirations for environmental reconstructions".
- Collate data for use by government agencies, regional councils and communities to develop plans to restore and protect lakes.

== Methodology ==
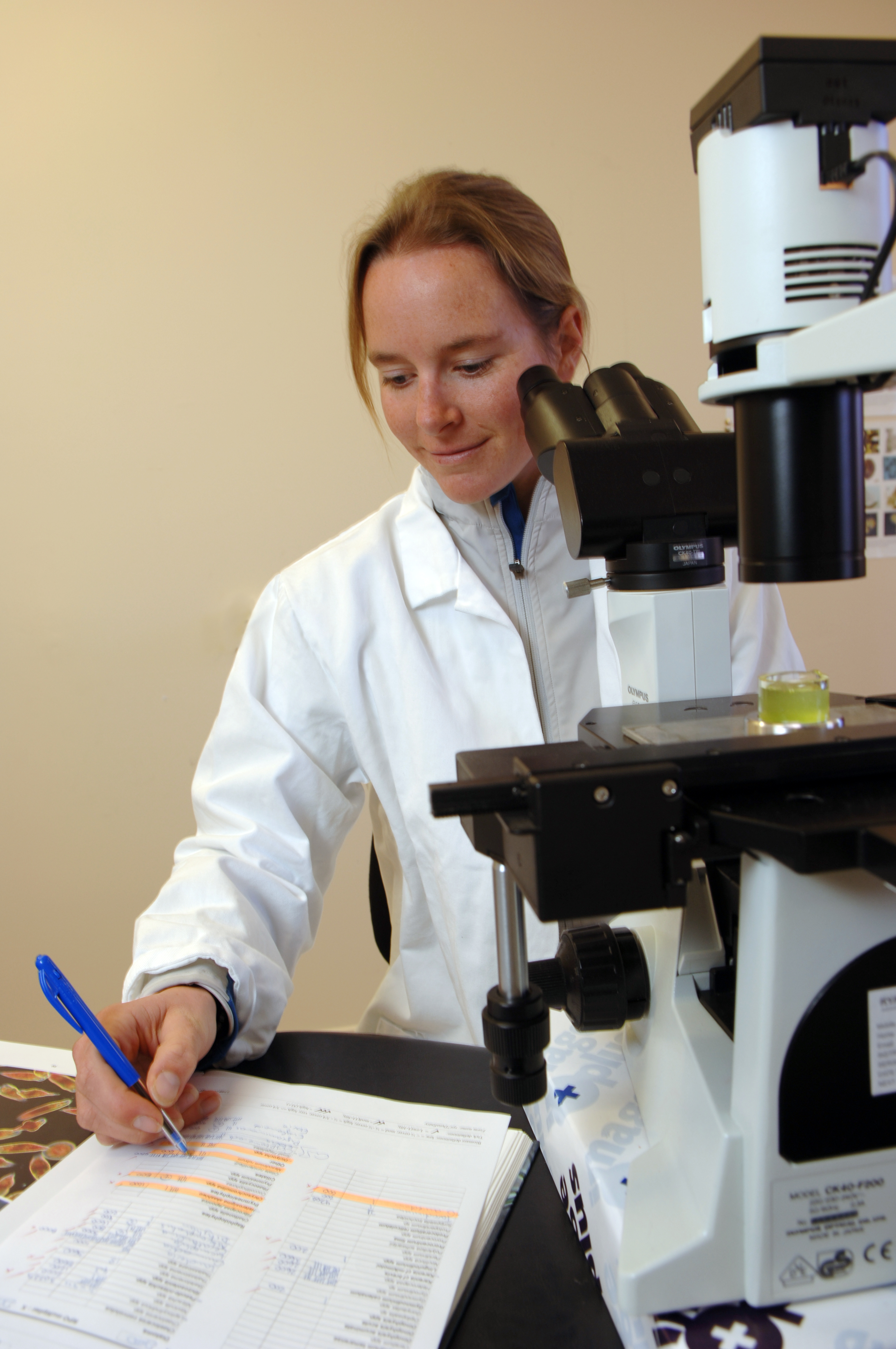
Analysing samples June 2019

Lake bottom sediment and water samples and sediment cores were gathered from New Zealand lakes, with the samples then analysed using a range of methods to determine what lived in the lake, its current health, and to explore how and why the health of the lake had changed. Susie Wood explained that the sediments build up over time in a lake and hold a record of the lake and its surrounding catchment, and using a range of scientific techniques allowed the team to "recreate hundreds of years of history...like a storybook, going back in time". Marcus Vandergoes from GNS Science, said the cores were stored and scanned in a specially-built facility where the analysis of the samples of the material showed past, current and future ecological and environmental change. He noted that some samples were sent to institutions around the world to be analysed and half of each core was stored at −20 °C.

In the introduction to a presentation at European Geosciences Union's General Assembly in 2021, members of the research team explained the difference between the traditional paleolimnological methods of gathering data on sediments and the application of environmental DNA techniques. While Lakes380 used both methods, a key part of the project involved using 16S rRNA gene metabarcoding to explore how the microbial community had changed, particularly with regard to human intervention. It was stated that combining these molecular methods with "hyperspectral scanning and pollen data" increased the understanding of when and why these changes occurred.

There was a significant social science aspect to the project, including public access to lakes. In this subproject, the team aimed to "evaluate legal and practical access to lakes in the Lakes380 dataset for members of the public ... [with the lakes] ... selected based on geographic spread, altitude, species, catchment land cover, and cultural significance". It was shown that 33% of the lakes had good access while 28% could not be legally accessed due to private property issues. The importance of this work has been noted because "barriers to access lakes leads to the loss of lake knowledge, stories, cultural practices and enables lake degradation".

== Regional sampling ==
In 2019, Lakes380 scientists gathered data from four lowland shallow lakes in the Southland region with a goal of using data to improve understanding of the current and historical conditions in the lakes.

In 2020, around 26 lakes in Waikato were sampled in a campaign regarded by Wood as the largest work of this sort ever in the region. Vandergoes said that each sample would provide important information about the nature and causes of how the lakes had changed. He explained that "Lake sediments are natural archives that continuously record environmental history, providing measures of current and historical Aquatic ecosystems and water quality."

During the same field sampling campaign, Lakes380 joined with a team from the University of Waikato to gather samples from three lakes to determine the effect of prehistoric earthquake activity and provide information on the potential risk to the city of Hamilton in 2020. The study established that lake sediments in the area included layers of volcanic ash (tephra) and that five layers of this in the cores showed possible signs of liquefaction, indicating that there may have been previously unrecognised earthquakes in the Hamilton lowlands over the past 20,000 years. Professor Lowe from Waikato University said that although Hamilton was known for having a low to moderate earthquake risk, this may now need to be revised, and "by studying the nature of the tephra layers using CT scanning and geotechnical methods, we aim to calculate the intensity of shaking and develop a new understanding of seismic hazard in and around Hamilton".

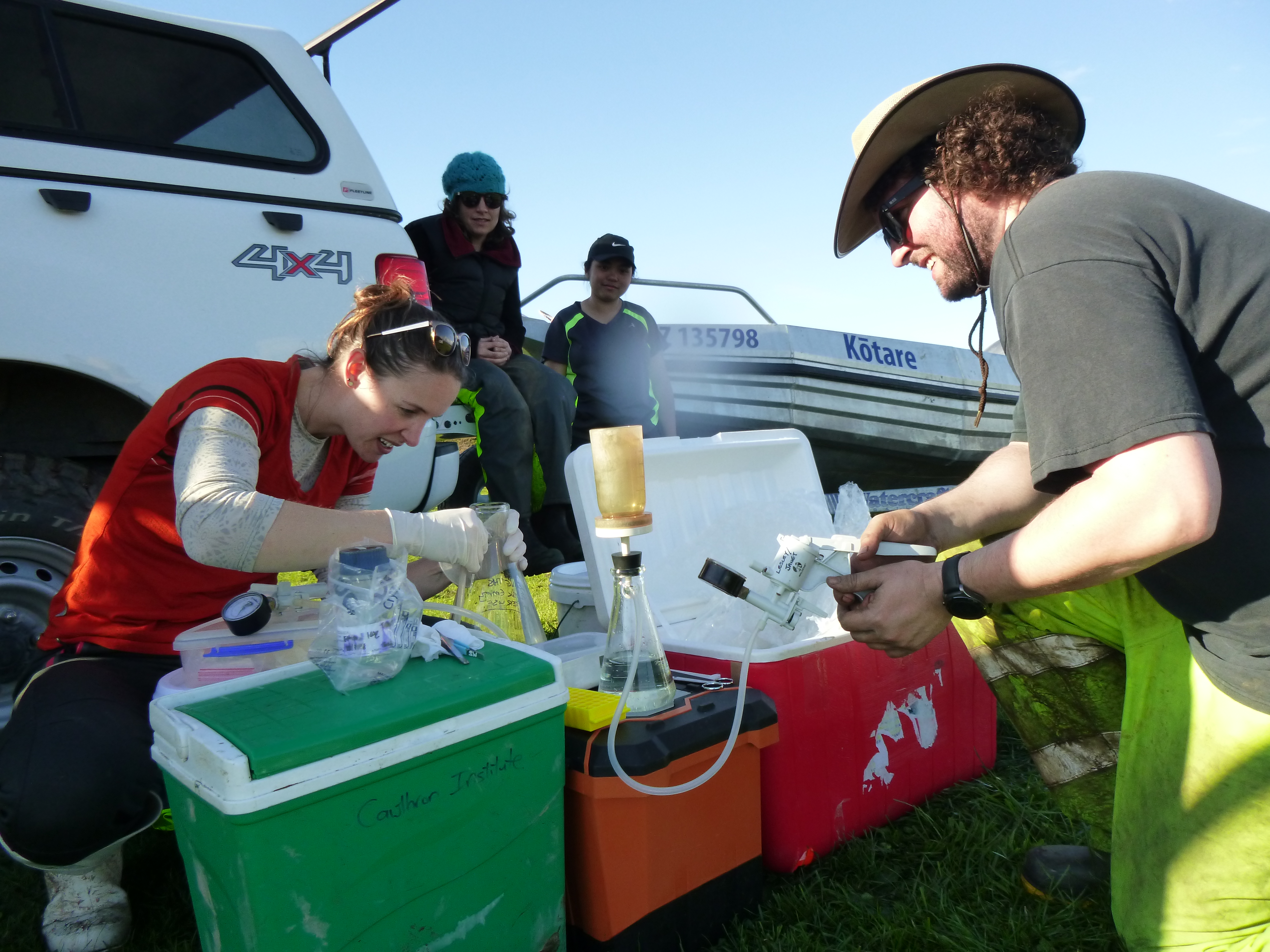
Lake380 fieldwork at Waiorongomai in Wellington Region

On 1 July 2020, the Otago Daily Times reported that samples collected from Queenstown lakes had revealed history going back thousands of years, providing what the University of Otago paleoclimatologist Chris Moy said was important information about how climate, environment and ecosystems in the area had changed over time. The sediment cores were analysed at the University of Otago, and other lakes in the region were also sampled.

Sampling was undertaken of lakes in the Rotorua area in 2019 and 2021 to gather evidence on how the arrival of humans and the eruption of Mount Tarawera in 1886 had impacted the ecosystems. As of February 2021, the findings had shown the bacterial communities within Lake Ōkataina had not returned to their pre-eruption state, and that in most of the lakes, there had been an increase of algae – possibly due to changes in land use and the introduction of other animals and plants. Nicki Douglas, Te Arawa Trust Environmental Manager, said that although alarming, the results were expected and the information could be used to enforce better biosecurity to protect the lakes as taonga for future generations.

Lake Rotoiti, in the Tasman region, has been noted by Wood as one of the most "pristine" in the country and she felt that the research, by working on lakes like this showed the importance of protecting the lake.

== Working with tangata whenua ==
The Lakes380 project built in-depth relationships with iwi in the Wairarapa and Rangitikei districts as part of weaving together traditional knowledge, science and local history, and worked on a joint website to encourage conversations about the wellbeing of Wairarapa lakes. Environment manager Rawiri Smith of Ngāti Kahungunu ki Wairarapa, said the lake stories had provoked changes in thinking and behaviour based on "common humanity rather than through confirmation or enforcement", and Charlotte Šunde of the Cawthron Institute noted that "digital storytelling like this is a fairly new and very effective way of bringing lake stories to a wide audience, reaching far beyond the impact of scientific publications".

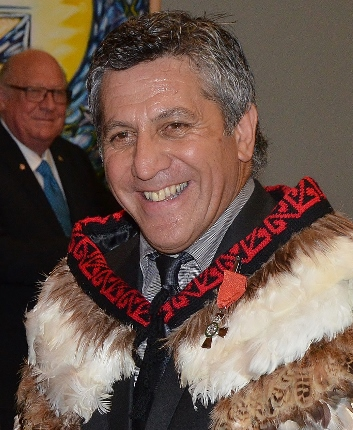
Harry Burkhardt

As the Lakes380 team travelled around Aotearoa, they worked closely with iwi in each region. For example in 2019, Lakes380 scientists collaborated with Ngāti Kurī to study the health of the lakes in Northland, which had dune lakes that were highly threatened aquatic habitats. Harry Burkhardt, the chair of the Ngāti Kuri Trust, said the project would help to get systems in place that will "protect the area's unique biodiversity and enhance the iwi's relationship with the natural world".

In May 2021, Ngāti Apa ki te Rā Tō, as mana whenua and kaitiaki of Nelson lakes, welcomed people to an information session to share knowledge of the work being done by Lakes380. Ngāti Apa ki te Rā Tō shared stories of their connections with the lakes, and the Lakes380 team showed how sediment cores are collected and how they allow the history of lakes to be explored.

When Ngāti Kahungunu ki Wairarapa launched a programme in August 2023 with the aim of understanding the water quality and diversity of Lake Wairapapa combining "scientific techniques and mātauranga Māori", they involved the Cawthron Institute and GNS Science to continue work they had done previously with Lakes380 that had provided information on the drivers of degradation of other lakes in the area. Scanning of sediment cores in these lakes showed how the water quality had changed historically [providing] "time-stamped data including what animals, plants, algae, and insects were present in and around the lake in each period and how changes in land use and management practices around the lake might have impacted the water quality." Examples from the time of post-European settlement included the effect of the burning of beech and podocarp forest causing layers of charcoal in the cores and introduced perch and trout, said by a leader of the team, [to have] "caused a big shift in the communities of bacteria that lived in the lake, indicating these fish are a major driver of the severe cyanobacterial blooms the lake [experienced] most summers." Ra Smith, the Environmental Manager for the iwi, said the ultimate goal was for "Lake Wairarapa to obtain its own tino rangatiratanga – or flourishing growth within its own ecosystem."

== Educational opportunities ==
In 2019, the Partnership Through Collaboration Trust collaborated with scientists from Lakes380 and created a series of workshops for students. For the workshops held in Whanganui, the key learning points were: how to collect and assess a sediment core; understanding what cyanobacteria are and how they can be managed; and the use of environmental DNA to measure the biodiversity of lakes. Learning the traditional knowledge of Māori of the lakes was facilitated by Mike Paki who represented local iwi. Another workshop involved lake sediment analysis in Rotorua where students were taught how environmental DNA is utilised to gather data from sediment samples, and what the different layers in the core represent, for example, the grey ash that is believed to have come from the eruption of Mount Tarawera in 1886.

Lakes380 supported a number of university students. As part of her studies toward gaining a Master of Science, McKayla Holloway, from Victoria University and an employee of the Cawthron Institute, visited Lake Troup in Doubtful Sound to work as a part of the Lakes380 team gathering samples. The work proved challenging because of boulders below the surface of the lake, but Holloway said it was a "mission to find out the secret lives of New Zealand's lakes ... [that are] ... used for recreation as well as a source of drinking water, irrigation, and electricity generation ... [and] .. provide essential habitat for our freshwater species and have high cultural significance".

Amy Bridges, a student at Victoria University of Wellington, worked with the Lakes380 team to follow up on oral histories which suggested that two lakes may have been affected by tsunamis in the past. Samples from Lake Whakaki in Hawke's Bay were not able to be dated because they were a mixture of reeds and shells. While those from Lake Moawhitu on D'Urville Island didn't show direct proof of tsunami, the work done was acknowledged as being useful for future research that could look at the grain sizes to figure out possible causes of this mixing. Bridges said, "it is still possible that a tsunami did occur, so further research focusing on sediment from other parts of the lake could provide more insight".

As a result of a partnership with GNS Science, BLAKE, a New Zealand organisation established in recognition of Sir Peter Blake, awarded an Ambassador Programme to Soltice Morrison, noting that she would work with Lakes380 and "learn about environmental reconstruction and monitoring techniques and contribute to the effort to understand the health of New Zealand's lakes through time to the present day ... [assisting with] ... the field collection and laboratory analytics teams".

== Related awards ==
In the Queen's Birthday Honours 2021, Emeritus Professor Carolyn Burns CBE from Otago University was awarded Dame Companion of the New Zealand Order of Merit for services to ecological research. Burns was involved with the Lakes380 project in their Science, Advice and Implementation Group. She had also used the samples collected by the Lakes380 team, to study the factors that allowed two invasive species of Daphnia to spread into some New Zealand lakes, concluding from the evidence, that "it's looking as though dispersal might be related to distance to the nearest road – how accessible lakes are to humans".

== Gallery ==
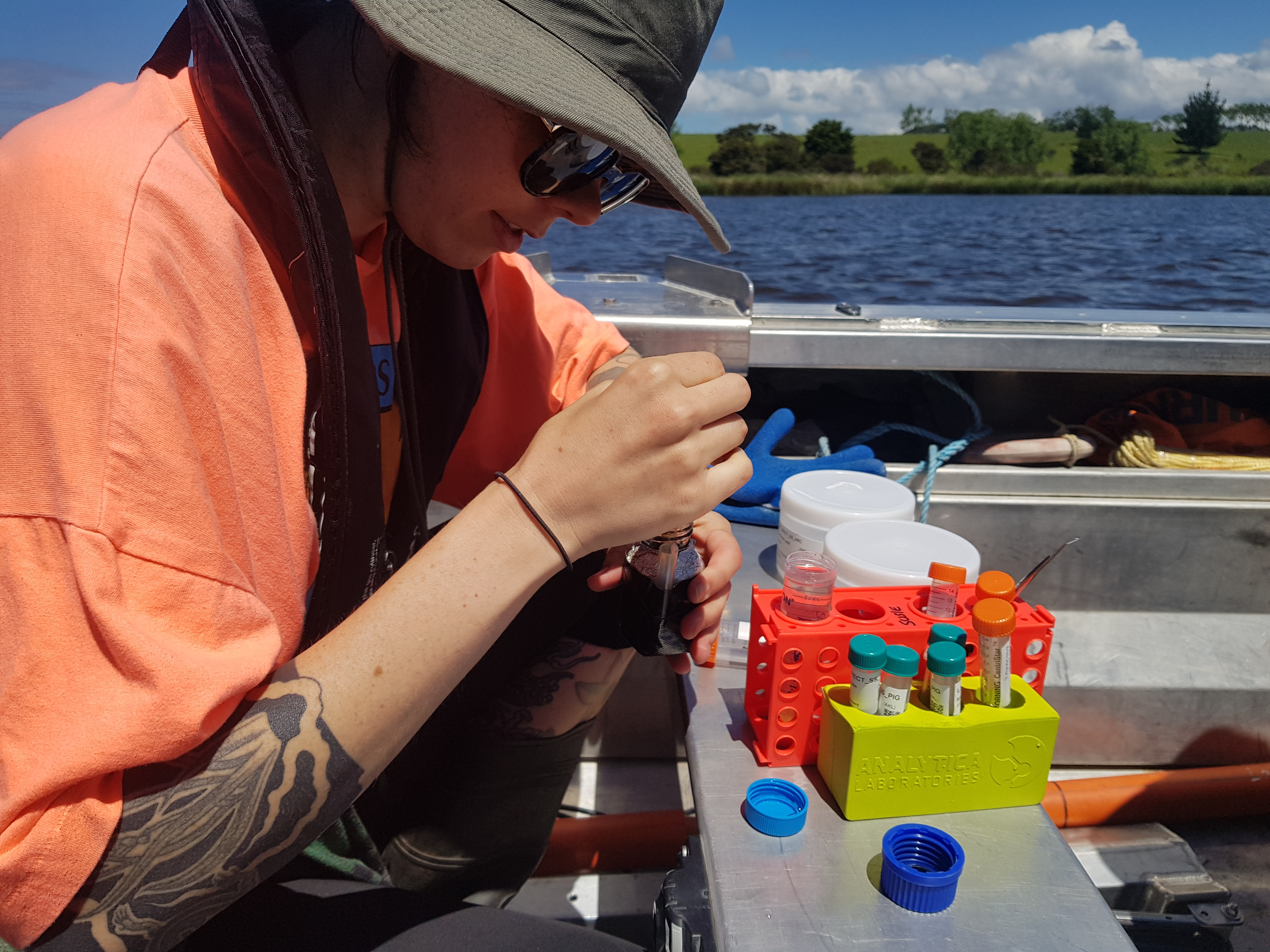
Lake Tomarata, Auckland

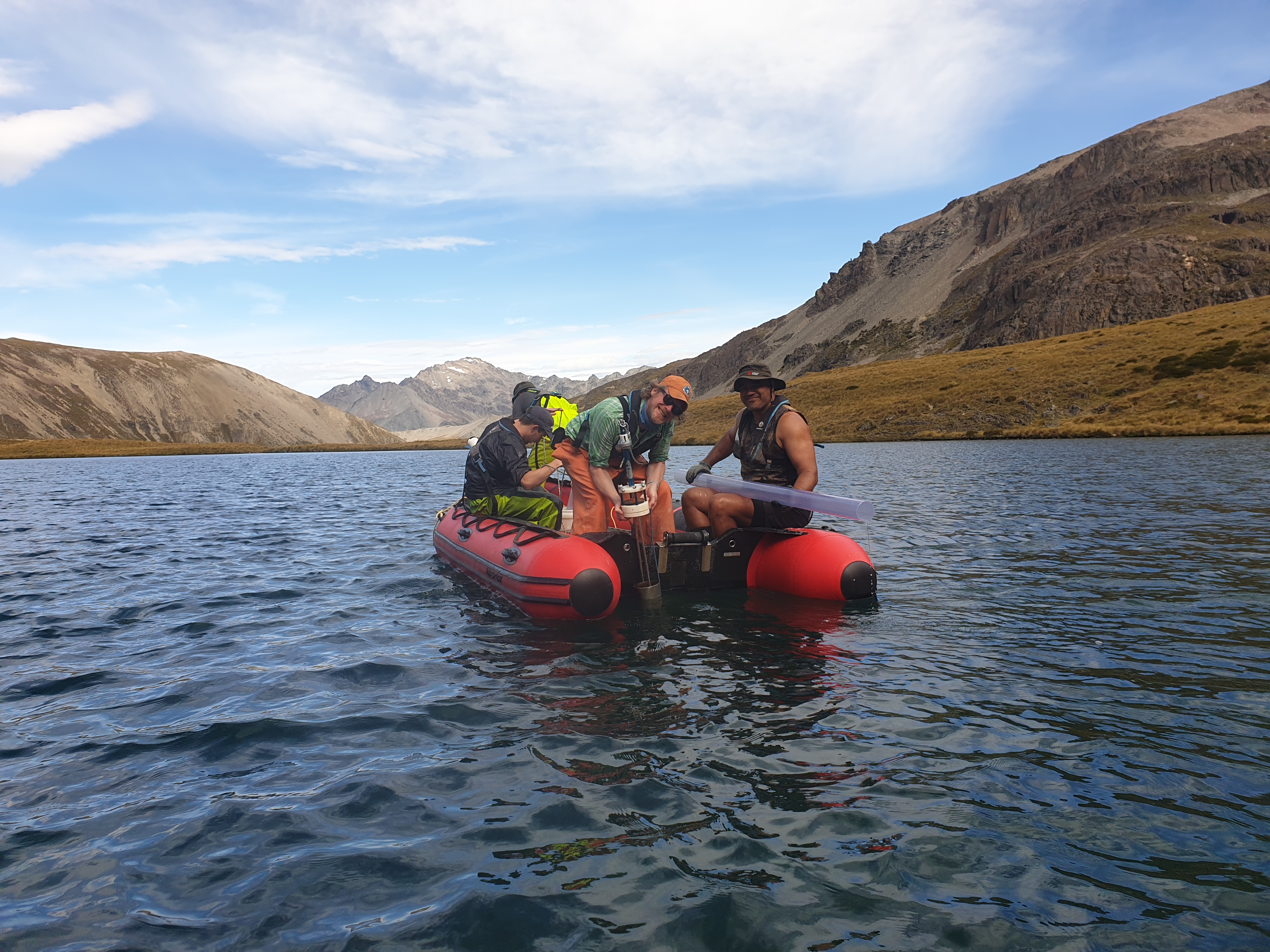
Lake Dumbbell in Canterbury region

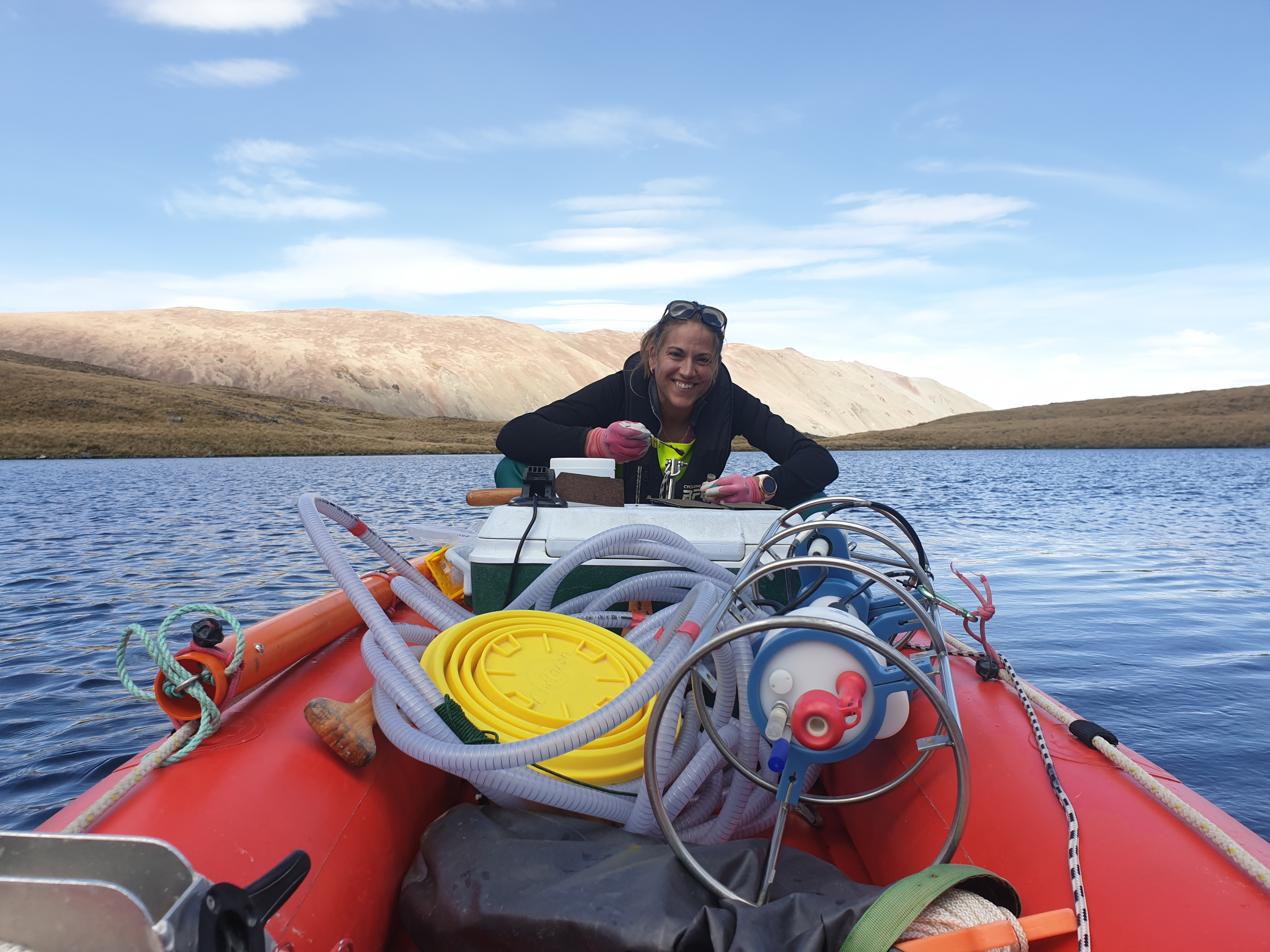
At a highland Canterbury lake

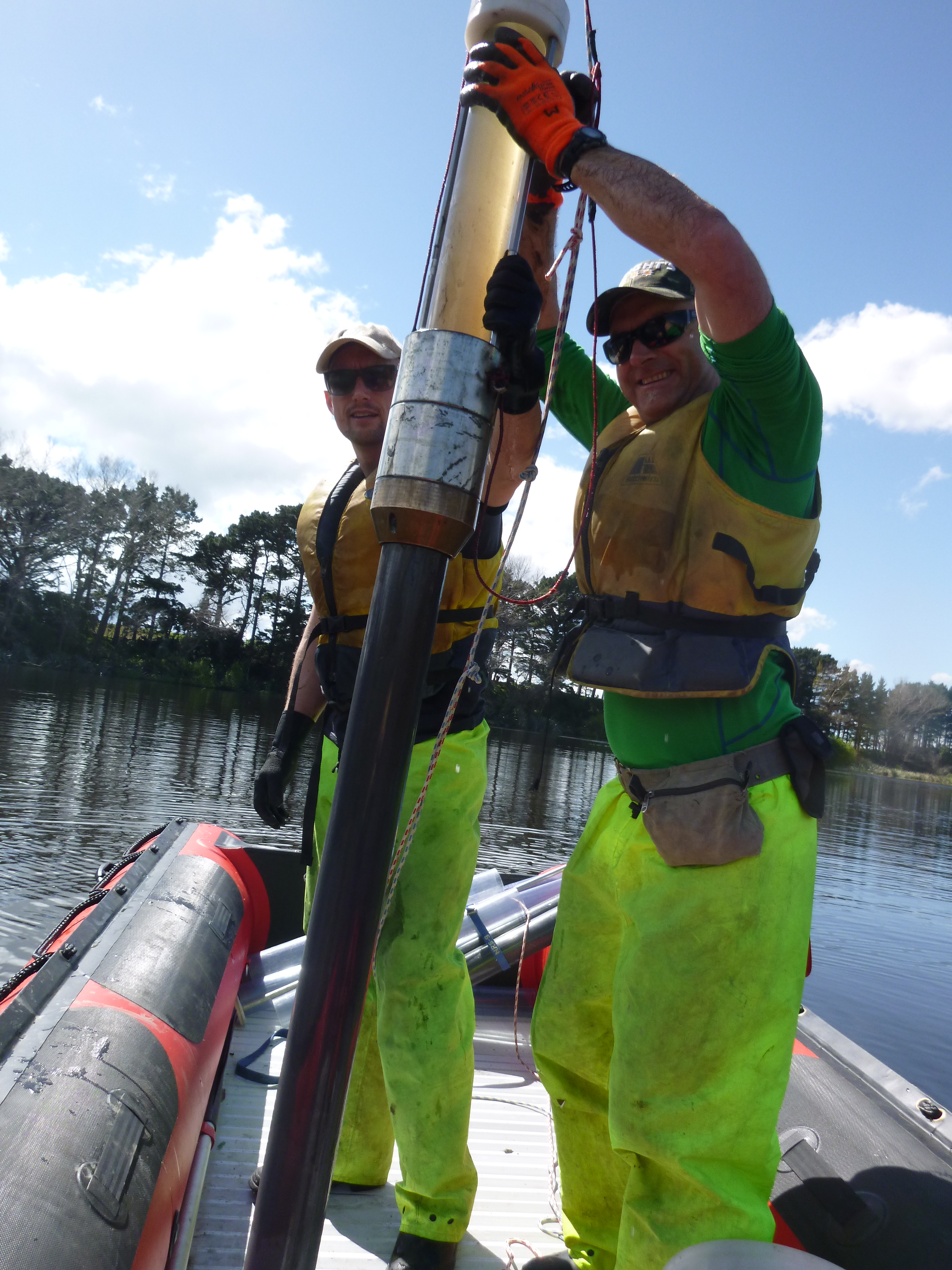
Lake Nganoke
