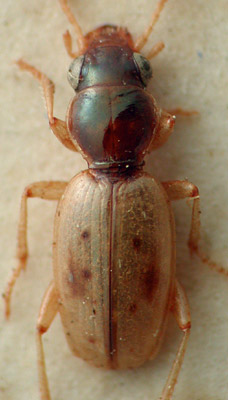

Conservation status
- Nationally Critical (NZ TCS)

Scientific classification
- Kingdom: Animalia
- Phylum: Arthropoda
- Clade: Pancrustacea
- Class: Insecta
- Order: Coleoptera
- Suborder: Adephaga
- Family: Carabidae
- Genus: Bembidion
- Species: B. tillyardi

Binomial name
- Bembidion tillyardi (Brookes, 1927)

Synonyms
- Cillenum tillyardi; Zecillenus tillyardi

= Bembidion tillyardi =

Species of beetle

The Back Beach beetle (Bembidion (Zecillenus) tillyardi) is a small critically endangered species of ground beetle, found only in the intertidal sand of Back Beach, a small sandspit near Nelson, New Zealand.

== Discovery ==
The Back Beach beetle was described in 1927 by Albert E. Brookes from specimens collected in 1925 at Tahuna Beach, Nelson by the director of the Cawthron Institute, R. J. Tillyard. Brookes named the new species Cillenum tillyardi in Tillyard's honour. Cillenum tillyardi was later renamed Zecillenus tillyardi, but Zecillenus in turn became a subgenus of the very large carabid beetle genus Bembidion.

== Description ==
This small flightless species is approximately 4 mm long and 1.3 mm wide. It occurs in 1–2 mm wide burrows at the high-tide mark in sandy sediment without too much mud.

== Conservation ==
Bembidion tillyardi has so far only been recorded from Back Beach, a sandspit on an inlet behind Tahuna Beach, Nelson. The beach is relatively recent in origin: originally the Waimea River outlet was on its landward side, and it was the eastern end of a long sandbank stretching back to where Rabbit Island is now. When the Waimea River carved a new outlet through the bank in 1875, sand began to accumulate in the Tahuna area, with dunes building up at the start of the 20th century, and the Back Beach inlet appearing by 1914. A recreation ground was created, and the area hosted car racing on the beach until the 1960s.

External videos
- Nelson Nature: saving the Back Beach beetle (Entomologist Ian Millar searches for B. tillyardi)

In recent years, the main channel in the Waimea estuary has been moving eastward, gradually eroding away Back Beach. B. tillyardi's habitat is also threatened by sea level rise and the depositing of fine sediment that the beetle cannot tolerate. Another threat to this species is recreational use of the beach, especially illegal use of off-road vehicles. B. tillyardi was given "Nationally Critical" status by the Department of Conservation.
