= Kathleen Curtis =

New Zealand mycologist

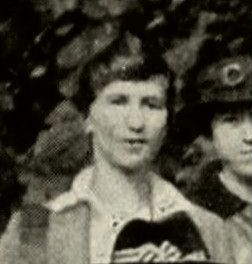
- England 1918
- Born: 15 August 1892; Foxton, New Zealand
- Died: 5 September 1994 (aged 102); Nelson, New Zealand
- Education: Imperial College London
- Known for: Plant pathology
- Spouse: Theodore Rigg (m. 1966; died 1972)
- Scientific career
- Fields: Mycology
- Institutions: Cawthron Institute
- Thesis: (1919)
- Doctoral advisor: John Bretland Farmer; Vernon Herbert Blackman
- Author abbrev. (botany): K.M.Curtis

Kathleen Maisey Curtis, Lady Rigg (15 August 1892 – 5 September 1994) was a New Zealand mycologist and was a founder of plant pathology in New Zealand.

== Biography ==
=== Early life and education ===
Curtis was born in Foxton on 15 August 1892 and was educated at Lyttelton West School from 1899 to 1902, Auckland Girls' Grammar School and Auckland University College. She graduated in 1914 with a BA with a Senior Scholarship in botany, and in 1915 was awarded an MA with first-class honours in botany. As a result of the high quality of her academic work she was awarded the 1851 Exhibition Scholarship. Curtis was also awarded the Orient Steam Navigation Company's travelling scholarship, which paid her fare to the Imperial College of Science and Technology, London, and the National Research Scholarship, which she declined. As a result of these awards she was able to travel to London in 1915 to further her study. The Exhibition Scholarship was later extended.

Curtis was the first New Zealand woman to graduate with a DSc. Her degree was gained in 1919 at Imperial College London for research on the potato wart disease (Synchytrium endobioticum). She was awarded the Huxley Medal for her thesis research, which was cited as the most outstanding result in mycological research that had been presented for ten years. Curtis' research remains one of the classic contributions to plant pathology and one of the most significant early contributions to plant science made by a New Zealand researcher. At the time of its publication the research was a contribution to the world pool of knowledge but was not a direct contribution to New Zealand plant pathology because it was not until 1970 that the potato wart disease was recorded in New Zealand.

=== Career ===
Curtis was a founding member of the Cawthron Institute. Although the Cawthron Institute was officially opened on 2 April 1921 Curtis had already accepted employment as mycologist in April 1920, working in the Department of Biology. Curtis would work for the Cawthron for the entirety of her career. In 1928 she was promoted to head of the newly formed Department of Mycology at Cawthron and, in 1929, attended the Imperial Mycological Conference in London. Her achievements were recognised by her election, in 1936, as the first woman fellow (later senior fellow) of the Royal Society of New Zealand. Curtis was also elected a fellow of the Linnean Society of London for her contributions to botanical research. She represented Cawthron at the 1948 Australian and New Zealand Association for the Advancement of Science conference in Hobart.

Between 1921 and 1952 Curtis published 27 research papers on a range of topics in mycology and plant pathology, mainly in relation to the Nelson region. She described the puffball fungus Claustula fischeri in 1926. Especially notable was her research on the black spot disease of apples and pears (Venturia inaequalis), and she was the first scientist in New Zealand to undertake research on the subject of resistance in plants to disease. She was also the first to draw attention to the significance of virus diseases in New Zealand. Curtis retired in 1952.

=== Later life and death ===
In 1966 Curtis married Sir Theodore Rigg, an agricultural chemist and scientific administrator, who was a widower following the death of his first wife, Esther Mary White, seven years earlier. He died in 1972.

In 1994 Curtis had her portrait painted, as a young DSc graduate, by Colin Allen. This painting was hung in the New Zealand Royal Society's headquarters in Wellington. The Bishop of Nelson, Peter Sutton, paid tribute to her service to science at the Thomas Cawthron Memorial Lecture in 1994 and, following her death at Nelson on 5 September that year, conducted her funeral service at St Barnabas' Church, Stoke. Curtis' ashes were buried in Marsden Valley Cemetery.

In 2017, Curtis was selected as one of the Royal Society Te Apārangi's "150 women in 150 words", celebrating the contributions of women to knowledge in New Zealand.

== See also ==
- Timeline of women in science
