= Theodore Rigg =

Agricultural chemist, scientific administrator (1888–1972)

Sir Theodore Rigg KBE
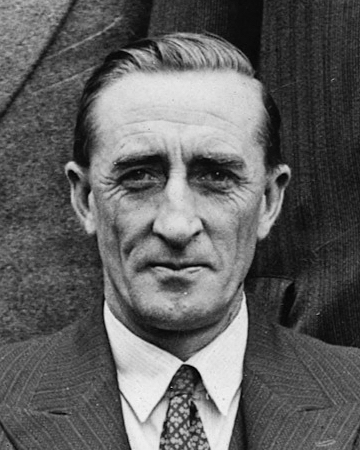
- Rigg in 1936
- Born: 6 April 1888; Settle, Yorkshire, England
- Died: 22 October 1972 (aged 84); Nelson, New Zealand
- Resting place: Marsden Cemetery, Nelson
- Education: Wellington College; Victoria University College; St John's College, Cambridge
- Spouses: Esther Mary White (m. 1919; died 1959); Kathleen Maisy Curtis (m. 1966)
- Children: 2
- Relatives: Helen Hughes (daughter)
- Awards: Honorary DSc, University of Western Australia (1947); Honorary DSc, University of New Zealand (1957)
- Scientific career
- Institutions: United States Department of Agriculture; Cornell University; Cawthron Institute
- Academic advisors: Thomas Easterfield

Sir Theodore Rigg KBE (6 April 1888 – 22 October 1972) was a New Zealand agricultural chemist and scientific administrator.

== Biography ==
Rigg was born in Settle, Yorkshire, on 6 April 1888, the son of John Rigg, a merchant and a staunch Quaker, and Hannah (née Wilson). On 20 February 1890, he and his family emigrated from England, sailing from London on the SS Doric and settling in New Zealand in the Wellington suburb of Newtown.

Rigg was educated at Newtown School and Wellington College. He entered Victoria College, where he was a chemistry student under Professor Thomas Easterfield; he graduated MSc with first-class honours in 1911. Next, an 1851 Research Fellowship gained Rigg a place at St John's College, Cambridge, where he was awarded a BA in agricultural research in 1914.

Rigg had followed his father into the Quakers and so, when war began, he looked for humanitarian work and joined a relief organisation of the Society of Friends. He distributed food and money to the needy in France, Albania, Montenegro and Russia, and was able to use his organisational and agricultural skills to assist in the farming recovery and the relief of refugees. While serving in Samara, Russia in 1917, he met Esther Mary White, a former teacher from Philadelphia; they eventually worked together until they left Russia in 1919.

In 1920, back in New Zealand, Rigg joined the foundation staff of the Cawthron Institute, Nelson, under the directorship of his former mentor, Easterfield. He became a leading figure in all aspects of agricultural research. He was appointed head of the Department of Agriculture and Chemistry in 1924, assistant director in 1928 and director of the Institute in 1933, on the retirement of Easterfield.

During his career Theodore Rigg gained many honours and distinctions, including fellowships of the Royal Institute of Chemistry (1925), the New Zealand Institute (1932), and the Royal New Zealand Institute of Horticulture (1947); and honorary doctorates of science from the University of Western Australia (1947) and the University of New Zealand (1957). He was appointed a Knight Commander of the Order of the British Empire in the 1938 New Year Honours. In 1953, he was awarded the Queen Elizabeth II Coronation Medal.

== Family ==
Theodore Rigg married Esther Mary White in Philadelphia on 8 October 1919. They had two daughters: Esther Mary in 1922 and Helen Hannah in 1929.

Rigg’s first wife died on 15 October 1959. He married Kathleen Maisey Curtis on 2 December 1966. She was a retired mycologist, formerly at the Cawthron Institute, and elected first female Fellow of the Royal Society of New Zealand in 1936. Kathleen died on 5 September 1994 in Nelson, aged 102.

Theodore Rigg died on 22 October 1972. His ashes are interred at Marsden Valley Cemetery, alongside those of his two wives.
