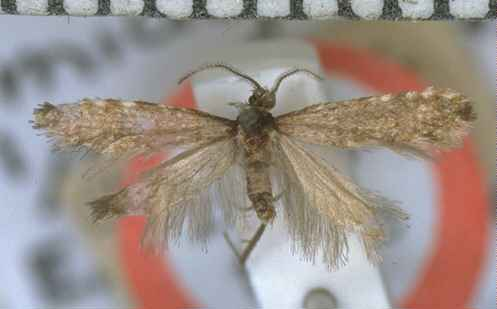
- Male holotype specimen

Scientific classification
- Kingdom: Animalia
- Phylum: Arthropoda
- Class: Insecta
- Order: Lepidoptera
- Family: Psychidae
- Genus: Reductoderces
- Species: R. microphanes

Binomial name
- Reductoderces microphanes (Meyrick, 1888)

Synonyms
- Mallobathra microphanes Meyrick, 1888; Taleporia microphanes (Meyrick, 1888); Mallobathra fragilis Philpott, 1927

= Reductoderces microphanes =

Species of moth

Reductoderces microphanes is a moth of the family Psychidae. This species is endemic to New Zealand. R. microphanes is a bagworm moth and its larvae likely feed on lichen or algae. Historically there has been some confusion over the identification of this species with George Hudson mistakenly describing and illustrating unnamed species and then attributing those descriptions and illustrations to this species. Charles Edwin Clarke discussed this species stating that it and its close relatives were active and able to be collected in damp mists before sunrise.

== Taxonomy ==
This species was first described by Edward Meyrick in 1888 using a male specimen collected in Christchurch in August and named Mallobathra microphanes. In 1915 Meyrick revised New Zealand Tineina and maintained this placement. In 1928 in his book The butterflies and moths of New Zealand, George Hudson discussed and illustrated moths purporting to be this species under the names Taleporia microphanes and Mallobathra fragilis. In 1971 J. S. Dugdale removed this species from the genus Taleporia and placed this species within the genus Reductoderces. In 1988, J. S. Dugdale stated that both descriptions and illustrations by Hudson of Taleporia microphanes and Mallobathra fragilis in his 1928 book The butterflies and moths of New Zealand referred to unnamed species rather than to Reductoderces microphanes. In 1988 Dugdale also synonymised Mallobathra fragilis with Reductoderces microphanes. The placement by Dugdale of this species into the genus Reductoderces was confirmed in the Inventory of New Zealand Biodiversity. The holotype specimen is held at the Natural History Museum, London.

== Description ==
Meyrick described the species as follows:

Male. — 9 mm. Head, palpi, and antennae light fuscous; palpi moderate; antennal ciliations 2 1/2. Thorax fuscous. Abdomen grey. Legs grey-whitish. Forewings elongate, costa slightly arched, apex rounded, hindmargin extremely obliquely rounded; rather dark fuscous, irrorated with very obscure grey-whitish spots; costa with four more distinct small white spots on posterior half: cilia whitish-fuscous, basal half except towards anal angle fuscous obscurely spotted with whitish. Hindwings light grey; cilia 1 1/2, grey-whitish.

== Distribution ==
This species is endemic to New Zealand. It has been collected in its type locality of Christchurch as well as in Dunedin.

== Behaviour ==
Charles Edwin Clarke stated that the adults of this species are active and able to be collected in damp mists before sunrise.

== Host species and habitat ==
It is likely that the larvae of this species are lichen or alga-browsers. The larvae of this species inhabit long, flanged cases which can be found on cliff-faces, tree trunks or stones.
