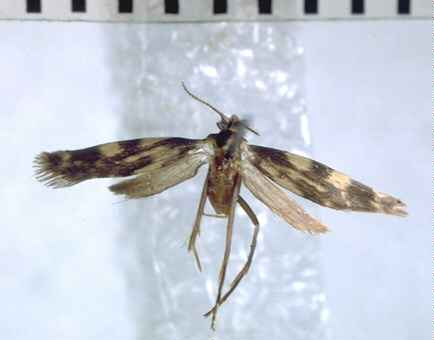
- Male holotype

Scientific classification
- Kingdom: Animalia
- Phylum: Arthropoda
- Clade: Pancrustacea
- Class: Insecta
- Order: Lepidoptera
- Family: Psychidae
- Genus: Reductoderces
- Species: R. fuscoflava

Binomial name
- Reductoderces fuscoflava Salmon & Bradley, 1956

= Reductoderces fuscoflava =

Species of moth endemic to New Zealand

Reductoderces fuscoflava is a moth of the Psychidae family. It was first described by John Salmon and John David Bradley in 1956. This species is endemic to New Zealand and is found on Campbell Island.

== Description ==
This species is small with a forewing expanse of 8 millimetres (0.31 in). The ground colour of the forewings is dark brown with three yellow blotches and the cilia being a mid brown colour. Hindwings are also a brown colour.
