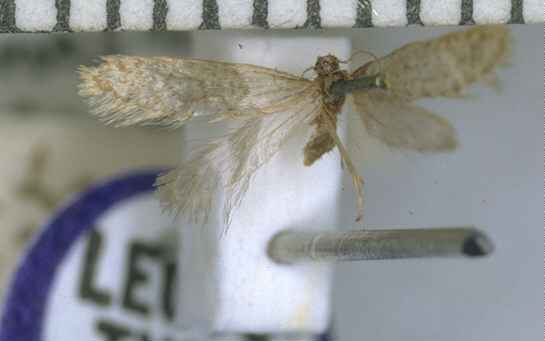
- Lectotype specimen

Scientific classification
- Kingdom: Animalia
- Phylum: Arthropoda
- Class: Insecta
- Order: Lepidoptera
- Family: Psychidae
- Genus: Reductoderces
- Species: R. araneosa

Binomial name
- Reductoderces araneosa (Meyrick, 1914)

Synonyms
- Mallobathra araneosa Meyrick, 1914

= Reductoderces araneosa =

Species of moth, endemic to New Zealand

Reductoderces araneosa is a moth of the family Psychidae. It was described by Edward Meyrick in 1914. It is endemic to New Zealand and can be found in the lower part of the South Island. The preferred habitat of R. araneosa is on the edge of native beech forest. The larvae construct a case made from silk, moss and lichens and emerge from it to feed. The female of this species is wingless. The males of this species are on the wing in November and February and have been captured in the early morning.

== Taxonomy ==
This species was first described by Edward Meyrick and originally named Mallobathra araneosa. In 1927 Alfred Philpott discussed and illustrated the male genitalia of this species. 1928 George Hudson discussed and illustrated this species in his 1928 book The butterflies and moths of New Zealand. The male lectotype specimen, collected at Ben Lomond in Otago, is held at the Natural History Museum, London.

== Description ==
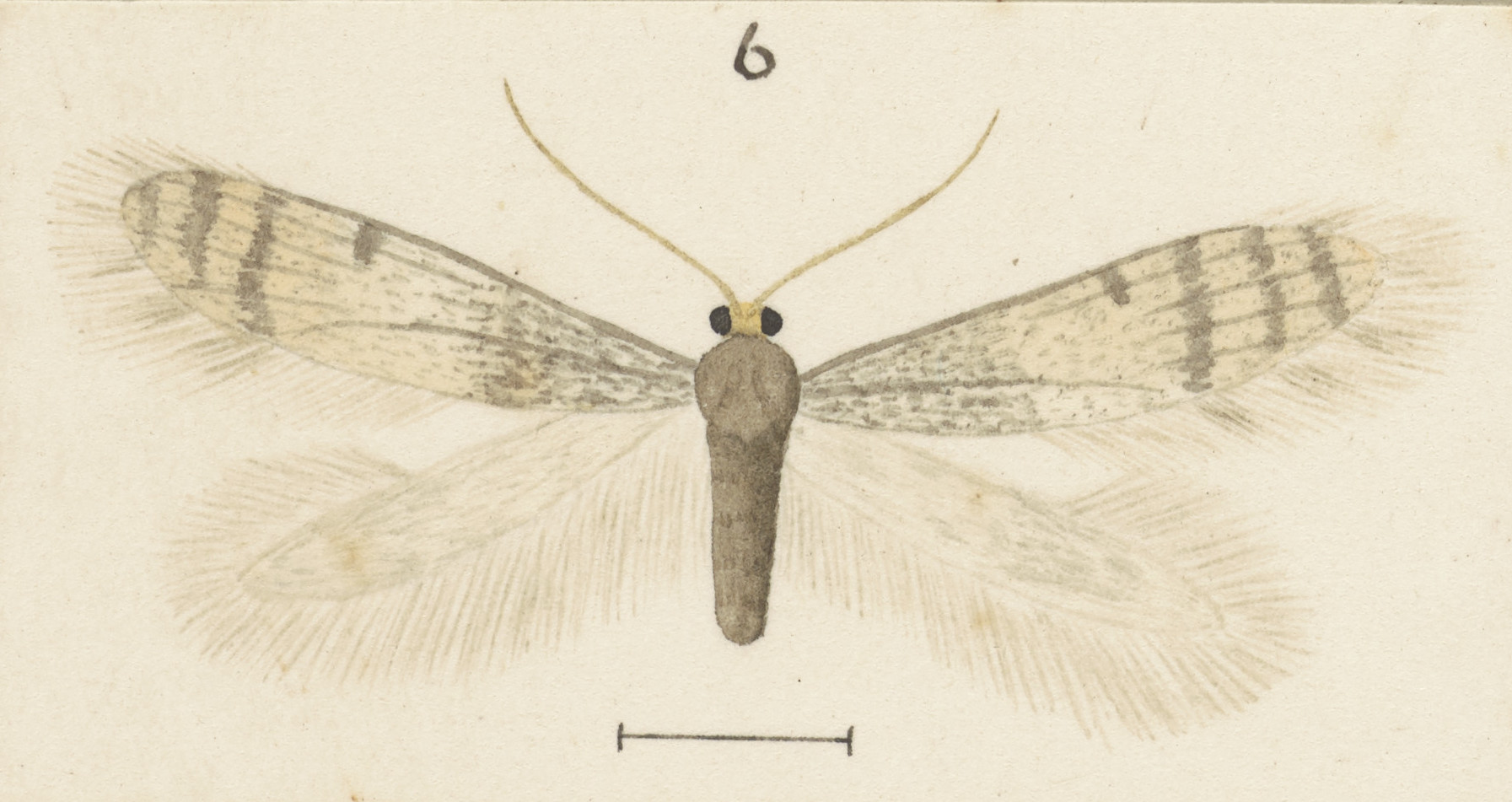
Illustration by Hudson.

Hudson described the adult of this species as follows:

The expansion of the wings is considerably under 3/8 inch. The fore-wings are elongate, narrow with the apex round-pointed and the termen very oblique; very pale bnownish-ochreous; the basal third is faintly clouded with pale grey and there are two series of faint grey spots crossing the outer portion of the wing; the principal veins are also marked in grey. The hind-wings and cilia are very pale whitish-grey.

The female of this species is wingless. This species can be identified by its delicate appearance and semi-transparent forewings.

== Distribution ==
This species is endemic to New Zealand and has been observed in Dunedin, in the Otago Region and at the Hump, in the Longwood Range and in the Hunter Range all in the Southland Region.

== Habitat ==
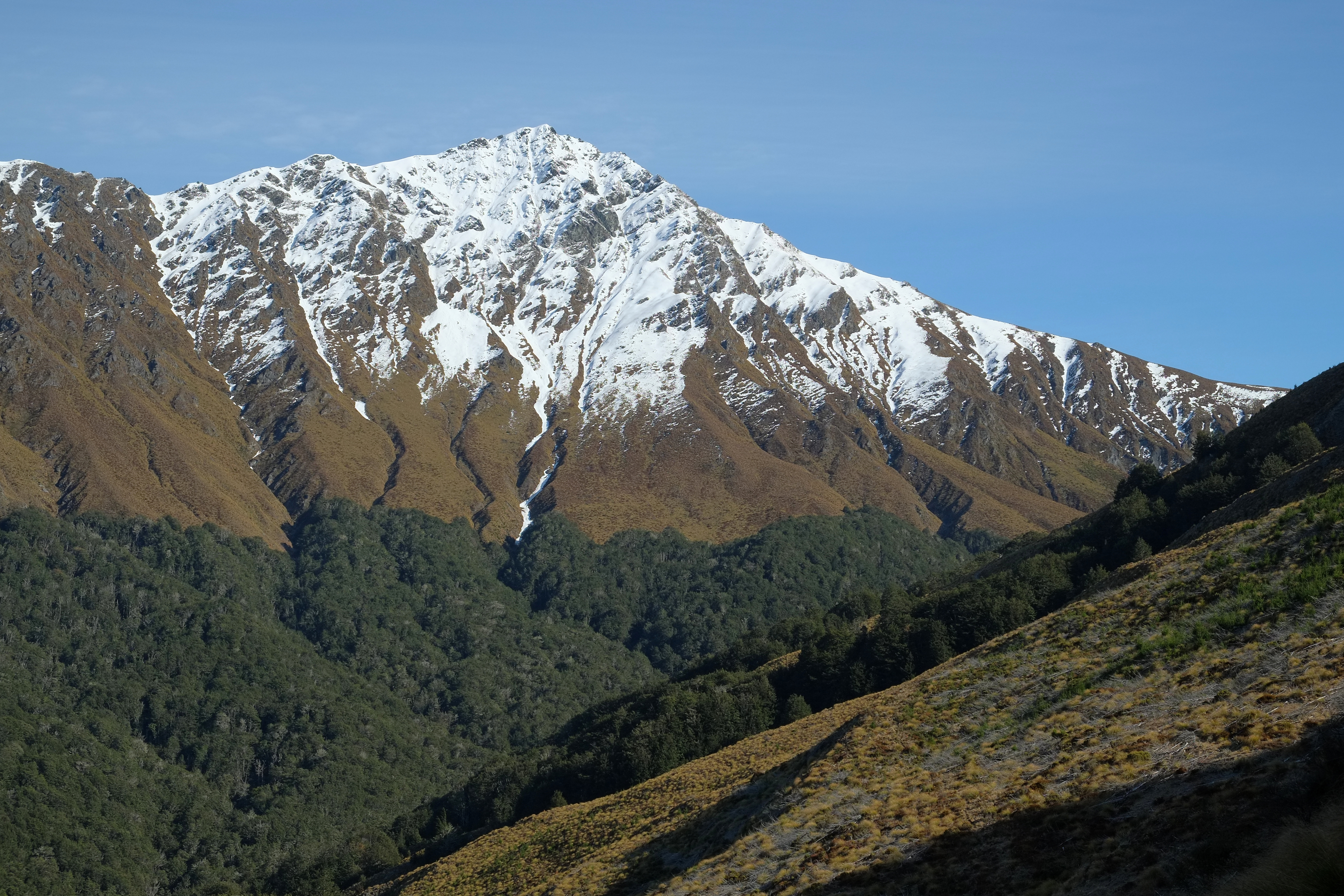
Ben Lomond, the type locality of R. araneosa.

This species inhabits the edges of native beech forest.

== Behaviour ==
The larvae of this species, and of all species in the genus, create cases from silk and pieces of lichen, moss and silk. When the female emerges from their larval case, she clings to it and emits a pheromone to attract a mate. Hudson stated that he captured adult specimens of this species in the early morning. Adults of this species are on the wing in November and February.
