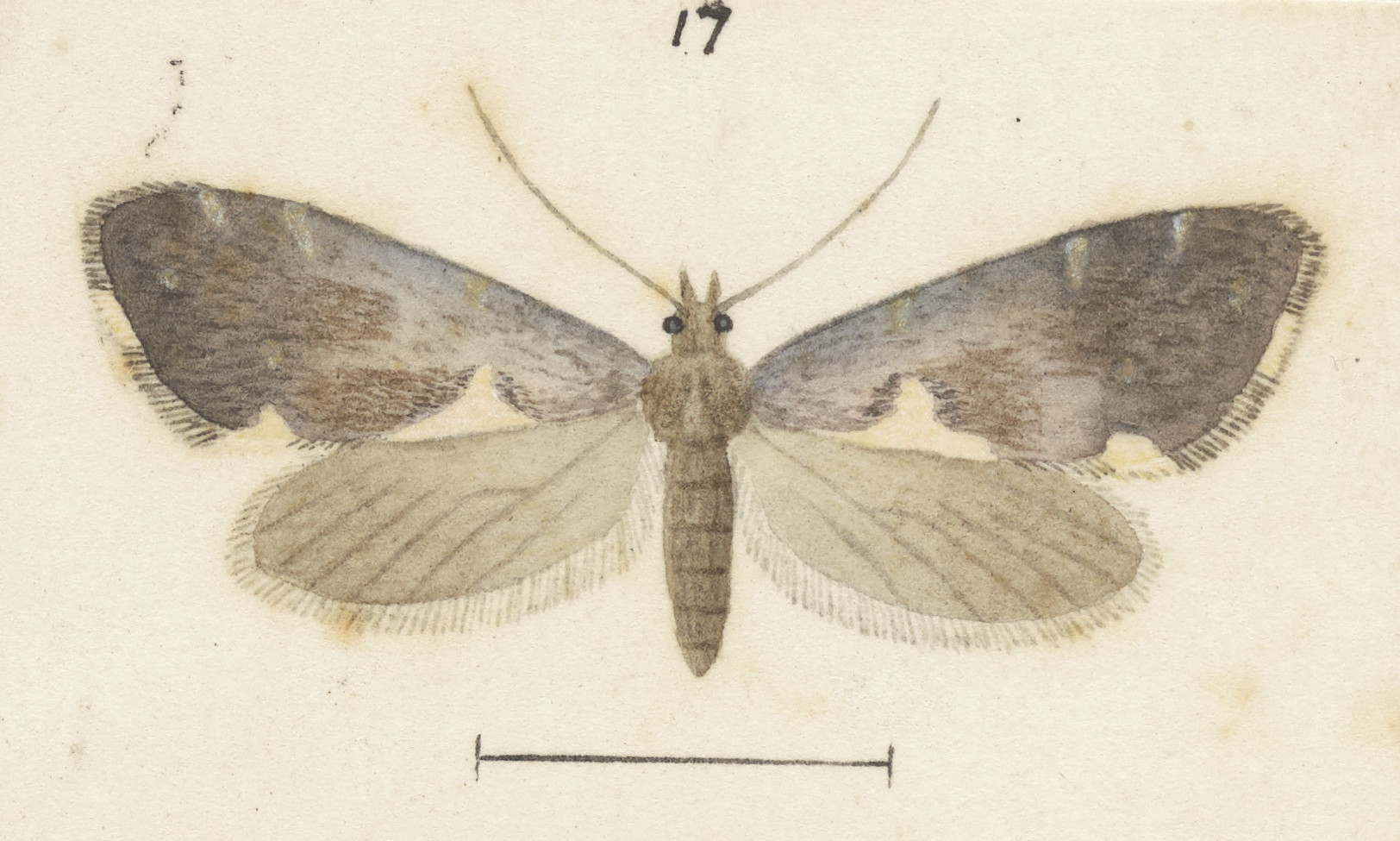

Scientific classification
- Domain: Eukaryota
- Kingdom: Animalia
- Phylum: Arthropoda
- Class: Insecta
- Order: Lepidoptera
- Family: Psychidae
- Genus: Reductoderces
- Species: R. illustris

Binomial name
- Reductoderces illustris (Philpott, 1917)

Synonyms
- Mallobathra illustris Philpott, 1917

= Reductoderces illustris =

Species of moth

Reductoderces illustris is a moth of the Psychidae family. It was described by Philpott in 1917. It is found in New Zealand.
