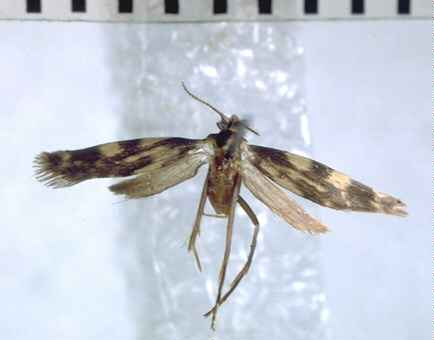
- Reductoderces fuscoflava type species

Scientific classification
- Domain: Eukaryota
- Kingdom: Animalia
- Phylum: Arthropoda
- Class: Insecta
- Order: Lepidoptera
- Family: Psychidae
- Genus: Reductoderces; Salmon & Bradley, 1956

Type species
- Reductoderces fuscoflava

= Reductoderces =

Genus of moths

Reductoderces is a genus of moths of the Psychidae family. This genus is endemic to New Zealand and the type species is Reductoderces fuscoflava.

== Species ==
Species in this genus include:

- Reductoderces araneosa (Meyrick, 1914)
- Reductoderces aucklandica Dugdale, 1971
- Reductoderces cawthronella (Philpott, 1921)
- Reductoderces fuscoflava Salmon & Bradley, 1956
- Reductoderces illustris (Philpott, 1917)
- Reductoderces microphanes (Meyrick, 1888)
