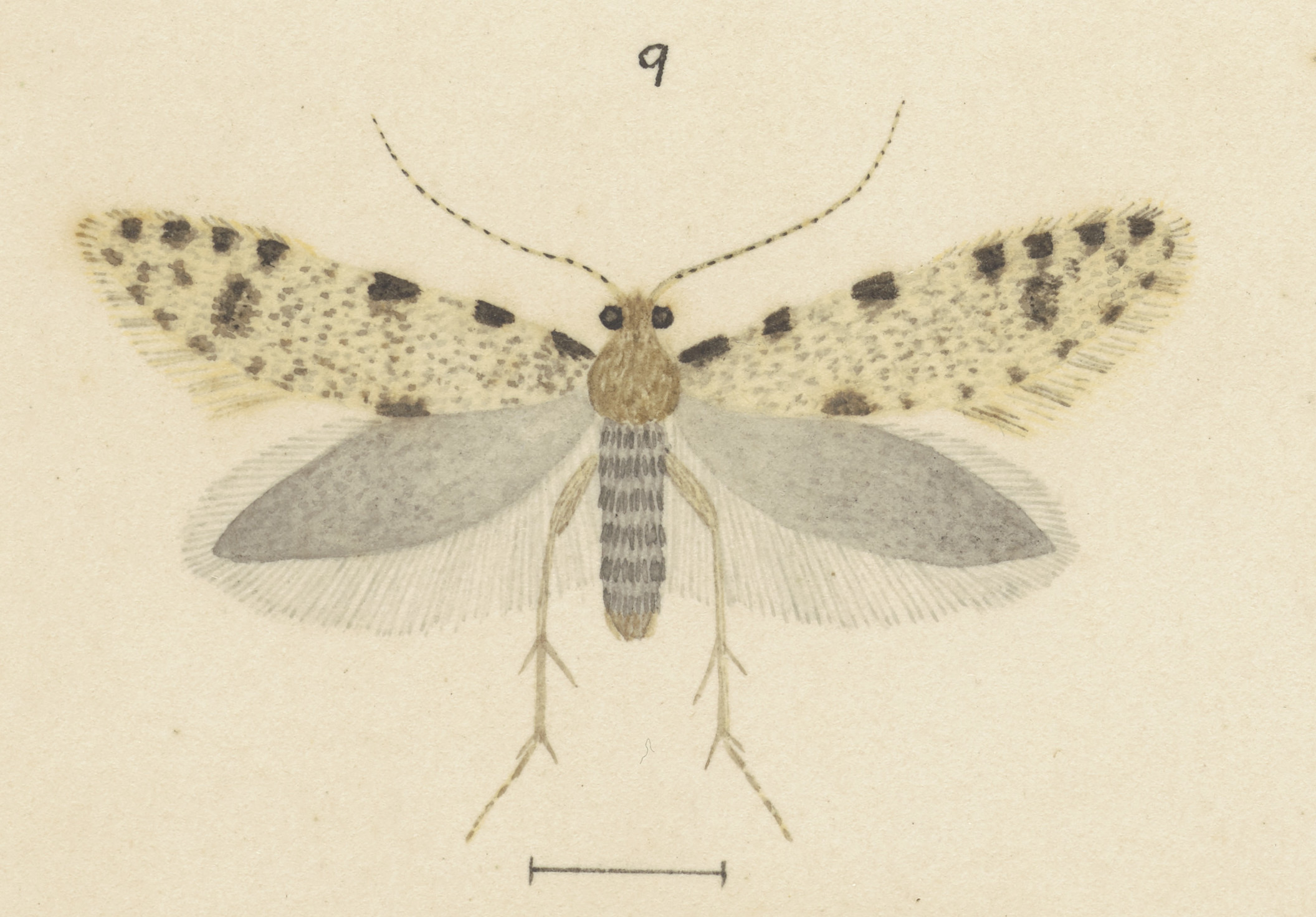
- Illustration of male

Scientific classification
- Kingdom: Animalia
- Phylum: Arthropoda
- Class: Insecta
- Order: Lepidoptera
- Family: Psychidae
- Genus: Reductoderces
- Species: R. cawthronella

Binomial name
- Reductoderces cawthronella (Philpott, 1921)

Synonyms
- Taleporia cawthronella Philpott, 1921

= Reductoderces cawthronella =

Species of moth endemic to New Zealand

Reductoderces cawthronella is a moth of the Psychidae family. It was described by Alfred Philpott in 1921 and named in honour of the Cawthron Institute. It is endemic to New Zealand and has been collected in Nelson on the Maitai Valley side of the Botanical Hill. The larvae inhabits a fragile, pear shaped case and it has been hypothesised that they are lichen or alga browsers. Larvae pupate at the end of June and adults emerge at the beginning of August until the middle of October.

== Taxonomy ==
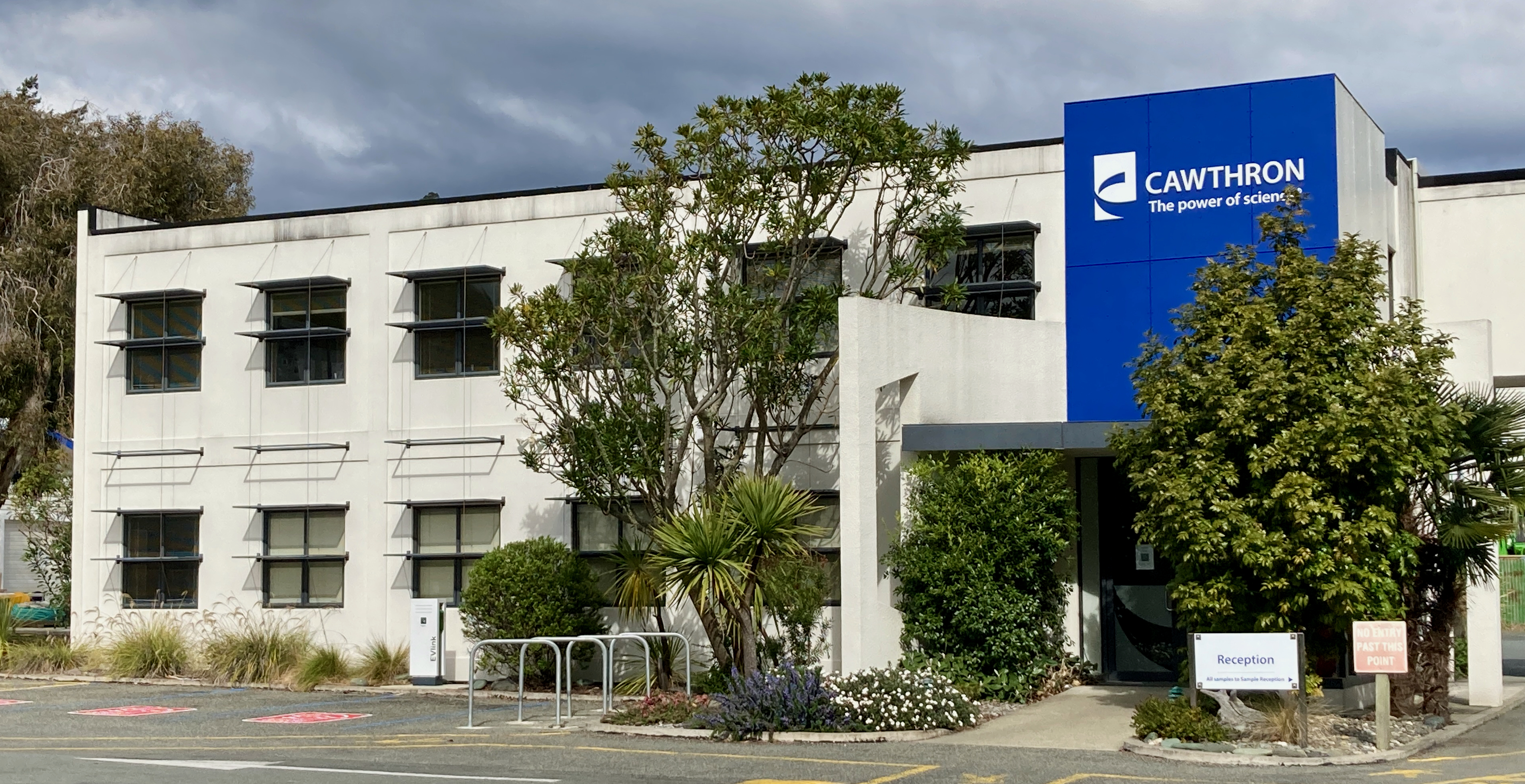
Cawthron Institute

This species was first described by Alfred Philpott in 1921, using adult moths reared from larvae collected on the Maitai Valley side of Botanical Hill in Nelson, and named Taleporia cawthronella. Philpott named this species in honour of the Cawthron Institute as this species was the first to be reared at its insectarium. This species was illustrated and discussed in 1928 by George Hudson using the name Taleporia cawthronella. In 1972 J. S. Dugdale placed this species in the genus Reductoderces. This placement was confirmed by Dugdale in 1988. The male holotype is held in the New Zealand Arthropod Collection.

== Description ==
Philpott described the adults of this species as follows:

♂. 9 mm. Head and thorax ochreous-grey Palpi whitish. Antennae grey annulated with black, ciliations 3. Abdomen grey-fuscous. Legs grey-whitish. Forewings, costa slightly arched, faintly sinuate, apex rounded, termen strongly oblique; whitish-grey, slightly ochreous and irrorated with fuscous especially on basal ¾; base of costa irregularly brownish-black to ¼; a rather large brownish-black spot on costa at ½; three smaller brownish-black spots on costa on apical ⅓; an irregular transverse brownish-black discal spot; a series of small blackish-brown spots round termen: cilia grey-whitish. Hindwings and cilia fuscous-grey.

The larva inhabits a fragile case which is pear shaped and is approximately 6mm long and 3.5 mm wide. Hudson described the larvae of this species as follows:

The head of the pupa is well separated from the thorax, and the legs reach quite to the extremity of the abdomen. On the dorsal surface of the last abdominal segment there is a transverse row of stout recurved spines; these probably serve to keep the pupa from slipping from the case when the emergence of the imago is taking place.

== Distribution ==
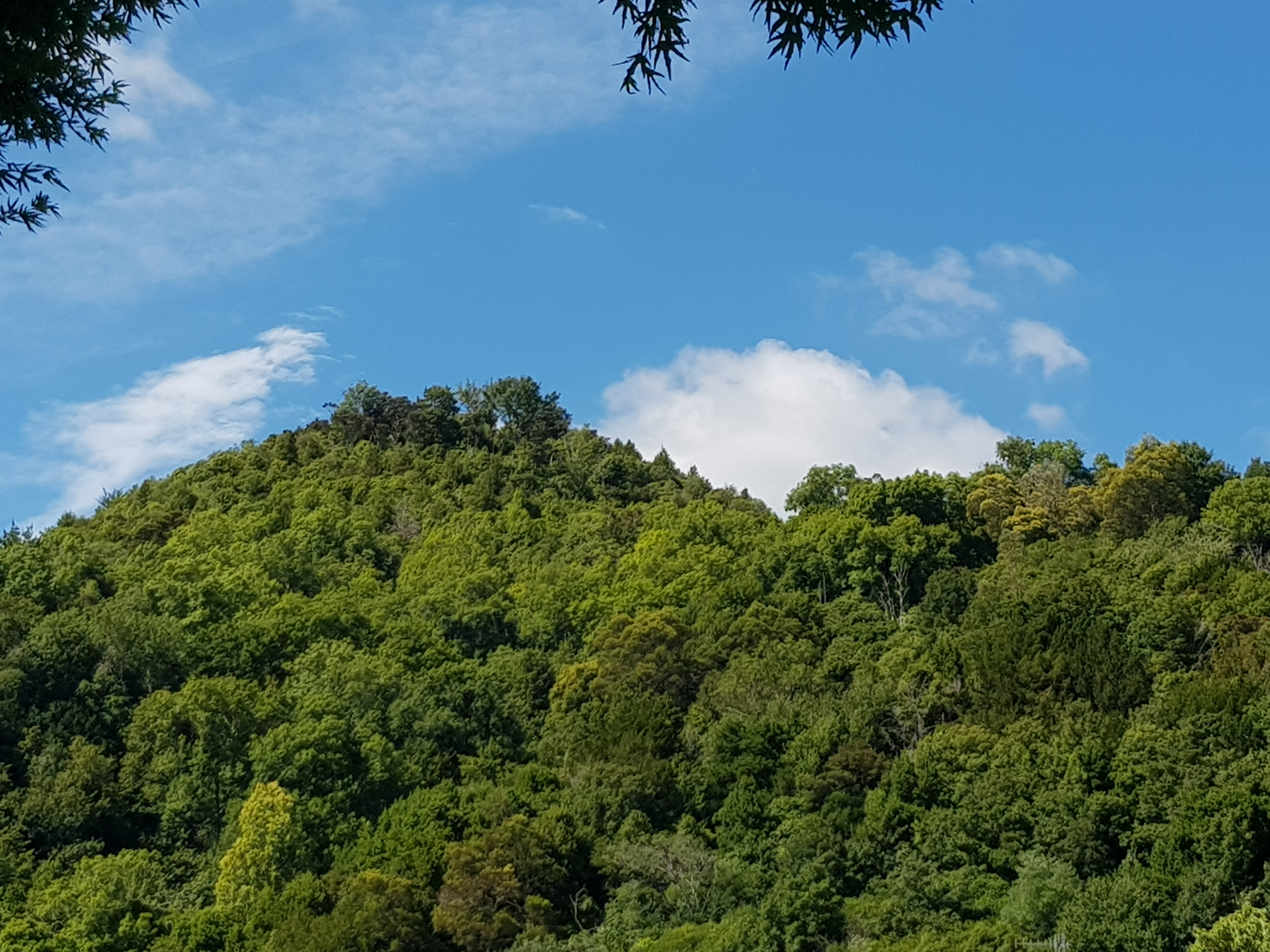
Centre of New Zealand, Nelson, type locality of R. cawthronella.

This species is endemic to New Zealand. It has been collected in Nelson.

== Hosts ==
It has been hypothesised that larvae in this genus are lichen or alga-browsers.

== Behaviour and life cycle ==
The larvae inhabit a case made from fragments of a white lichen. It travels in the case by extending its head and thorax and then lifting the case clear and forward. The larvae pupate at the end of June by attaching its case to a stone, twig or leaf. The attachment enables the case to swing in multiple directions. The adults emerge from the beginning of August until the middle of October.
