= Reductoderces aucklandica =

Scientific classification
- Domain: Eukaryota
- Kingdom: Animalia
- Phylum: Arthropoda
- Class: Insecta
- Order: Lepidoptera
- Family: Psychidae
- Genus: Reductoderces
- Species: R. aucklandica

Binomial name
- Reductoderces aucklandica Dugdale, 1971

Species of moth

Reductoderces aucklandica is a moth of the family Psychidae. It was described by John S. Dugdale in 1971. It is found on the Auckland Islands in New Zealand.
