= Susie Wood =

New Zealand microbiologist and marine scientist (born 1976)

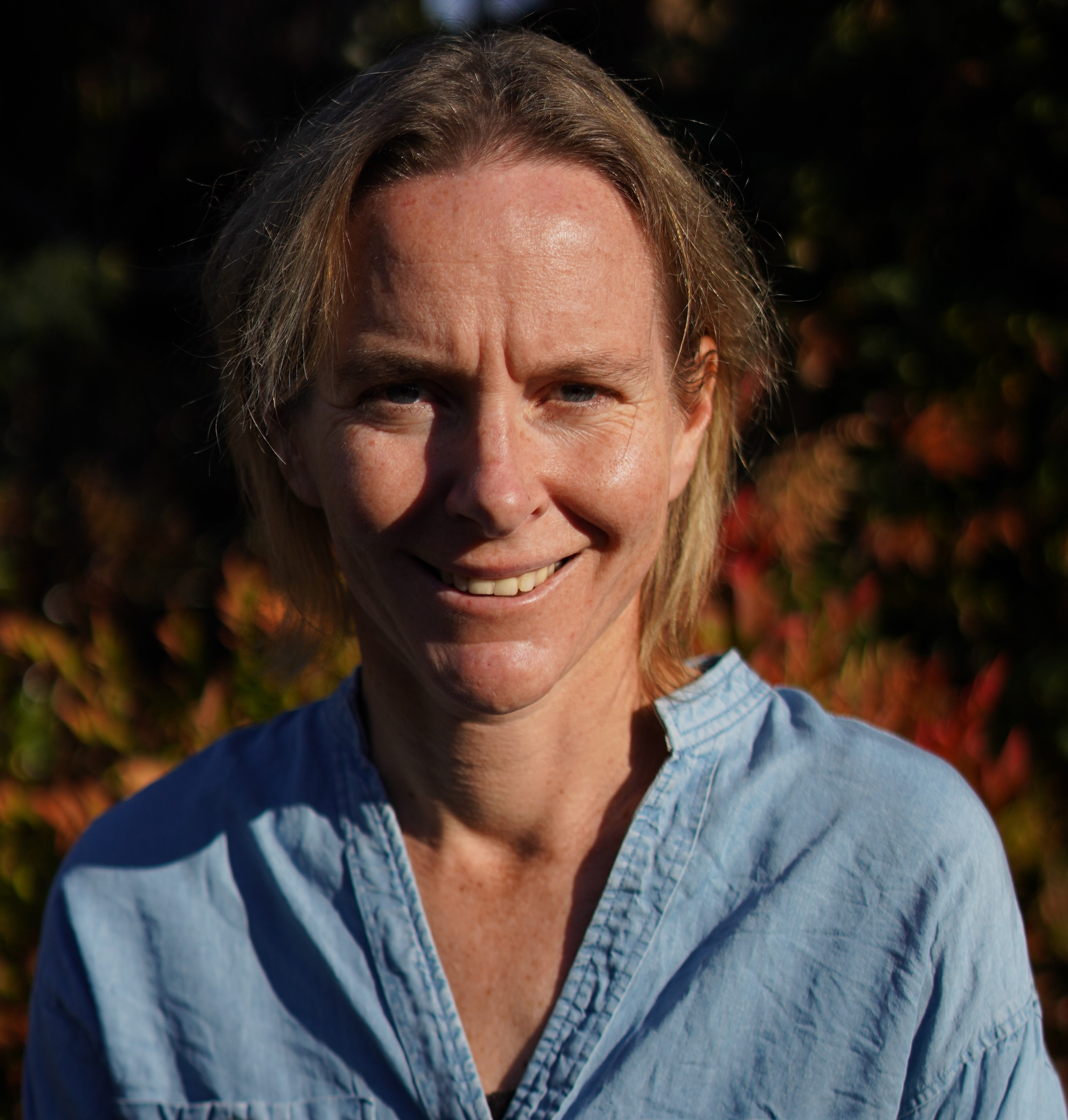
- Born: 1976 (age 49–50); Lower Hutt, New Zealand
- Education: B.Sc Hons (First Class) 1999; PhD (Biology) 2006; Post-Doctoral Fellowship. Foundation for Research, Science and Technology, 2006–2009
- Alma mater: Victoria University of Wellington
- Scientific career
- Fields: Biology – natural toxins, microalgae and microbiology
- Institutions: Cawthron Institute
- Thesis: Bloom Forming and Toxic Cyanobacteria in New Zealand Species Diversity and Distribution, Cyanotoxin Production and Accumulation of Microcystins in Selected Freshwater Organisms

Susanna Wood is a New Zealand scientist whose research focuses on understanding, protecting and restoring New Zealand's freshwater environments. One of her particular areas of expertise is the ecology, toxin production, and impacts of toxic freshwater cyanobacteria in lakes and rivers. Wood is active in advocating for the incorporation of DNA-based tools such as metabarcoding, genomics and metagenomics for characterising and understanding aquatic ecosystems and investigating the climate and anthropogenic drivers of water quality change in New Zealand lakes. She has consulted for government departments and regional authorities and co-leads a nationwide programme Lakes380 that aims to obtain an overview of the health of New Zealand's lakes using paleoenvironmental reconstructions. Wood is a senior scientist at the Cawthron Institute. She has represented New Zealand internationally in cycling.

== Career ==
Wood has a PhD from Victoria University of Wellington, with a thesis on microcystins in New Zealand freshwater organisms. From 2006 to 2009, Wood worked as a Foundation for Research, Science and Technology (FRST) Post-Doctoral Researcher (Cawthron and Waikato University). She has held honorary positions as a lecturer as Waikato University (2007–2011), and as honorary research associate, biological sciences, Victoria University (2010). Wood was senior research fellow, biological sciences, at Waikato University from 2011 to 2017, and since 2018 has been a senior adjunct fellow, Waterways Centre for Freshwater Management, University of Canterbury. Wood was employed at Cawthron Institute as a scientist in 2005 as scientist, Freshwater & Biotechnology groups in 2005, and from 2014 has been a senior scientist, Coastal & Freshwater group, Cawthon.

== Selected research ==
=== Identifying and understanding toxic cyanobacteria ===
A report co-authored by Wood on the survey of cyanotoxins in New Zealand water bodies between 2001 and 2004, noted that "contamination of drinking and recreational water bodies by toxic cyanobacteria is a significant water management issue in many countries...[with]...potential for a significant threat to human and animal health".

Earlier research by Wood while she was a PhD student had identified microcystin toxins from more than 80 water bodies in New Zealand and in 2003, this was published in a newsletter with a focus on the issue of cyanobacterial bloom in several New Zealand lakes. In the newsletter, Wood explained the difficulties of detecting and monitoring cyanobacteria and cyanotoxins and because algal blooms can appear or disappear very quickly, stressed the importance of continuous monitoring of bodies of water with known problems.

In November 2005 the stomach contents of one of five dogs that had died rapidly after contact with water from the Hutt River were examined. Wood participated in research that provided evidence, for the first time, that homoanatoxin-a and anatoxin-a, two toxic cyanobacteria, were likely to have caused the sudden death of the dog. The report concluded that further detection of these cyanotoxins in other rivers in the Wellington region and instances of the unexpected death of stock gave reason for concern about the health risk to animals and humans. Wood explained in a later news article that finding the contents in the stomach of dogs had confirmed the need for research to inform people that Cyanobacteria was often present in rivers and while it should always be treated as potentially toxic, it was most dangerous when it formed mats. Wood noted that there may be "tens of kilometres of New Zealand rivers covered with cyanobacteria mats producing the potentially lethal neurotoxin...[and]...in certain regions it [posed] a huge health risk".

=== Advocation for molecular detection techniques ===
Wood has been a strong advocate for the use of DNA-based tools to analyse samples and is a member of the Environmental Metagenomics team.

Further research focused on the value of these tools, and in 2015 Wood co-authored a journal article which concluded that genomics "provides an exciting new avenue to explore the genetic basis of toxin synthesis in complex environmental samples".

Wood participated in a 2016 case study that evaluated two high-throughput sequencing methods of biomonitoring using DNA techniques on samples collected from 12 New Zealand rivers.

In 2017, research led by Wood noted the importance of developing molecular techniques – such as quantitative polymerase chain reaction – to identify blue-green algal cyanobacterial cells (Phormidium) in water and distinguish toxic from nontoxic genotypes in microbial mat communities.

A 2020 paper, co-authored by Wood, summarised the work done since 2013 on toxic freshwater benthic cyanobacteria. It covered areas such as knowledge about the identification and distribution of toxin-producing benthic freshwater cyanobacteria and how to build an understanding of the factors that affect this; the effects of toxic benthic cyanobacteria on the ecosystem and animal health; and studies on toxic benthic cyanobacteria which had used -omics techniques such as metabarcoding, genomics and metagenomics.

Because of the uneven distribution of cyanobacterial cells and toxins on lake sediment, Wood and her team in 2020, made the case for employing molecular techniques – such as metabarcoding – to reconstruct historical cyanobacteria communities, as opposed to taking one sample which may not be representative of the whole lake. The paper held this would provide long term data that relates historical change with the prevalence of cyanobacterial bloom.

A 2021 study looked at the use of HSP-based metabarcoding and metagenomics, to characterize and assess the effects of fish farming on benthic ecosystems. The paper, co-authored by Wood, concluded that both approaches – although providing different functional profiles – are effective tools for providing data on the effects of fish farming on benthic ecosystems.

=== Impact of climate change on algal blooms ===
Wood was involved in a 2014 investigation into the nature of microcystins in New Zealand waterways that considered the likelihood of anthropogenic eutrophication of lakes, ponds and oceans creating favourable conditions for the rapid growth of some cyanobacterial species, including microcystin. She also contributed to the publication Impacts of Climate Change for New Zealand (2017), a document that contained a summary of how climate change can impact the potential harm from algal blooms.

A review of the impact of climate change on New Zealand lakes, co-authored by Wood, identified that New Zealand freshwater ecosystems were vulnerable to climate change impacts and increased levels of CO_{2} can alter the biogeochemical processes that affect the dynamics of cyanobacteria specifically blooms.

In 2014, Wood noted that studies have looked at variables such as water quality, temperature, oxygen content, and pH values, yet she concluded it was not contaminated waterways due to dairying that caused blooms of cyanobacterial mats in rivers, but more likely the felling of trees close to a river which caused a runoff resulting in high amounts of sediments. Wood has suggested that leaving uncut forest buffer zones of 100 metres beside rivers could make "a huge difference" to the amount of sediment washed in by rain.

Another study in which Wood was involved, looked into the potential effects of climate change on cyanobacterial communities. The study found "a positive relationship was identified between microcystin quotas and surface water temperature...[and]...these results highlight[ed] the complex successional interplay of cyanobacteria species and demonstrated the importance of climate through its effect on nutrient concentrations, water temperature, and stratification". Wood co-authored a paper in 2019 that reviewed research on understanding cyanobacteria within global changes resulting from climate change. The review noted cyanobacteria do play an important part in environmental cycles and food webs but stressed that this anthropogenic eutrophication played a major role in the increased production of toxins that have adverse effects on water quality and fish and "whole-system and multiple-system studies are needed to improve confidence in models predicting impacts of climate change and anthropogenic over-enrichment and hydrological modifications".

In a media interview on 17 January 2022, Wood made the case that rising water temperatures within New Zealand waterways could result in an increase of Cynobacteria containing cynatoxins, causing possible long-term health issues for people. She noted the danger of these toxins building up in food such as fish, crayfish and shellfish which if eaten, according to Wood, "could cause irreversible liver damage in humans, and even promote liver damage". Wood said that recreational water users in New Zealand were at risk because of the algal blooms on riverbanks or in water which could be accidentally swallowed. Wood concluded that "algal blooms are a symptom of human impact on the landscape...[and]...the flow-on effects from cleaning up our waterways would be important in managing the risks long-term". In the same article it was explained that New Zealand Councils had monitoring systems in place which informed people about which swimming spots were safe for swimming, and in a later interview on the same topic, Wood said that while councils were doing a good job with the monitoring, people must bring any areas of concern about local swimming areas to their regional council.

== Consultative work on National Guidelines ==
Wood contributed to a 2007 paper that identified risks associated with toxic planktonic cyanobacteria in drinking water, and highlighted the need for national guidance and policies for tackling the complex issues associated with benthic cyanobacteria which were not covered by the official government guidelines at the time,' Drinking-Water Standards for New Zealand 2005' and 'Guidelines for Drinking-Water Quality Management for New Zealand 2005'. The document stressed that "further research is required in New Zealand to establish the extent and latent risks posed by benthic cyanobacteria, particularly in drinking water supplies." In 2009, Wood co-authored the New Zealand Guidelines for Cyanobacteria in Recreational Fresh Waters – Interim Guidelines for the New Zealand government. The document aimed to provide a "monitoring framework for establishing the public health risk from cyanobacteria associated with contact recreation in lakes (mainly planktonic cyanobacteria) and rivers (mainly benthic cyanobacteria)".

In an international publication, Current approaches to Cyanotoxin risk assessment, risk management and regulations in different countries (2012), Wood summarised the documents that were guiding the regulation and management of cyanobacteria in New Zealand at the time. The summary noted that research had shown planktonic cyanobacteria in New Zealand produced a range of cyanotoxins, including anatoxin-a which had been shown to cause the death of animals, and saxitoxins in benthic mats that were likely to have contributed to humans becoming sick using the water recreationally. These concerns, as well as those around the safety of drinking water, are addressed in the government guidelines revised in 2008.

Wood co-authored a 2018 study commissioned by the NZ Ministry of the Environment to inform the development of a National Objectives Framework for the management of anatoxins in waters affected by Phormidium blooms. The report noted this study showed data would provide valuable information for the development of human health risk assessment models related to toxic blooms in rivers. Another study for the Ministry of the Environment (2018), made recommendations to a review of the 'Interim New Zealand Guidelines for Cyanobacteria in Recreational Fresh Waters', including updating the cyanobacteria alert-level framework, conducting further research to identify the health risks of benthic cyanobacteria in lakes and addressing the knowledge gaps to determine the risk posed by anatoxin in rivers.

Wood was invited to be a member of the NZ Ministry of Health, Drinking-water Advisory Committee (2018) which conducted a review of the regulations, leading to a reviewed set of Standards with a section on cyanotoxin compliance criteria.

== Lakes380 project ==
In 2017 Wood became joint programme leader for Our Lakes Health; past, present and future (Lakes380), a MBIE funded five-year research project that aimed to improve water quality in New Zealand lakes by using scientific tools to collect and analyse water samples, lake bottom sediment samples and cores which are natural archives of the environmental history of aquatic communities and water quality. The project is co-led by the Cawthron Institute and GNS Science. Wood commented that the project would provide information to understand what was driving environmental change and to inform initiatives to restore the ecological vitality of New Zealand lakes. On RNZ, Wood explained that the sediment cores would be analysed using DNA techniques to understand how and why the biological communities have changed, and gave an example of eDNA revealing the coinciding of cyanobacterial blooms in one lake with the introduction of introduced species of fish such as trout and European perch in the 1870s. This knowledge informed a restoration plan for the lake.

Wood has acknowledged that the lakes in the project had cultural importance to the local iwi, because they were often "important sites for mahinga kai (traditional food gathering)". She said that working with Ngāti Kurī using environmental DNA and scanning techniques to measure the current and past biodiversity of past biodiversity of lakes in the far north of New Zealand, [was] "a unique opportunity to learn from their long association with these lakes and further enrich our knowledge of these precious places". In 2020, it was announced that the Lakes380 Research Project would undertake the largest sampling of lakes ever undertaken in the Waikato area. Wood noted that during the sampling, there would be considerable engagement with local Iwi, [who are] "important partners in this project because one of our major goals is to ensure our lakes are valued and protected – now and for generations to come and our ability to do so is greatly enhanced by incorporating mātauranga Māori and indigenous knowledge into the research".

While researching lakes in the Rotorua area, the Lakes380 Team worked with Partnership Through Collaboration to offer an educational opportunity for students to take part in the extraction and analysis of lake sediment.

A collaboration between Lakes380 and researchers at the University of Windsor was confirmed in 2020 and Wood acknowledged it was an important opportunity to learn about their "metagenetic techniques" and how they could be used in New Zealand environments.

== Affiliations ==
- Wood is a member of Global Harmful Algae Bloom Scientific Steering Committee, an international group with the goal of improving understanding and prediction of Harmful Algal Blooms (HABs) in aquatic ecosystems, and management and mitigation of their impacts.
- She is an Invited Member of the Scientific Steering Committee, International Barcode of Life, an organisation which aims to use sequence variation in short gene regions, DNA barcodes to understand biodiversity by identifying species worldwide.
- Wood works with Inland Waters (Journal of the International Society of Limnology) as an Associate Editor.
- As part of a team that is recognised for being "experts in paleoecology, paleogenomics, [and] molecular ecology", Wood is on the advisory board of The SedaDNA Scientific Society.
- The Waterways Centre for Freshwater Management was established in 2009 as a joint partnership between Canterbury and Lincoln Universities to coordinate research and teaching in water resource management, and Wood is a Core Staff Member.

== Presentations ==
2020: Keynote Speaker, as part of the Lakes380 team, at Weathering the Storm, a joint conference organised by the NZ Hydrological Society, Rivers Group and Freshwater Science Society, with papers covering all aspects of Hydrology, River System Management and Freshwater Science.

2019: Keynote speaker, 11th International Toxic Cyanobacteria Conference, Poland.

2019: Presented "Toxic Cyanobacteria: Ancient Organisms Thriving in the Anthropocene" at the Urbanization, Water and Food Security Gordon Research Conference.

2018: Presented at the 6th Australian and New Zealand Cyanobacteria Workshop, 25 September 2018, UNSW Sydney.

2016: Presented on the topic 'Risky rivers: identifying river susceptibility and factors that promote benthic Phormidium proliferations', at the Fifth National Cyanobacterial Workshop Brisbane, 29–30 September 2016.

== Awards ==
In 2019, Wood was the winner of the New Zealand Freshwater Sciences Society Medal, "For her outstanding contribution to freshwater science and management, and her leadership of women in science."

== Cycling achievements ==
Wood has represented New Zealand as a cyclist at the Commonwealth Games and World Cup in 2006. In 2009 she was second in the XTERRA New Zealand event, and prior to taking part in a triathlon in Nelson in 2012, this success was acknowledged, with a local news article noting Wood was "strong on the road bike and can run pretty quickly on the flat". Speaking at the Nelson Mail and Network Tasman Top Student Awards in 2012, Wood said that passion, making the most of opportunities and learning from experience were what had driven her as a cyclist. She noted in her talk [that] "opportunity is a bird that never perches...[and]...learn backwards from experiences, but live forwards". Wood was a winner of the Reg Davies Memorial Trophy in 2014.
