= Cawthron Institute =

New Zealand science organisation

The Cawthron Institute is a research institution in Nelson, New Zealand focused on freshwater and marine research. It was founded in 1919 by Thomas Cawthron and is New Zealand's largest independent science organisation. The institute employs approximately 300 scientists, laboratory technicians, researchers, and specialist staff from 26 countries.

== History ==
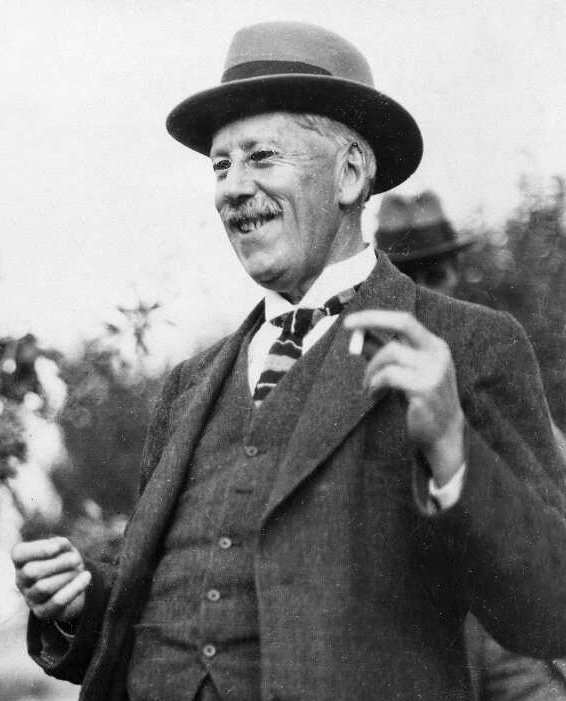
Thomas Hill Easterfield, the Institute's first director (c. 1926).

=== Origin ===
Nelson businessman and philanthropist Thomas Cawthron made substantial contributions to the Nelson community. When he died in 1915 he left £231,000, the bulk of his estate, for the creation of an "industrial and technical school institute and museum to be called the Cawthron Institute". Seven local public officials were appointed as trustees to execute his will, and they in turn set up an advisory commission (four prominent scientists plus the chairman of the Board of Agriculture). The commission's report in 1916, which was adopted by the trustees, set out the principles for such an institute. In 1917, the New Zealand government insisted that £40,000 in stamp duty was owed on the bequest; this decision was disputed and was subject to repeated legal challenges over the following 18 years. Thomas Easterfield, the founder and head of the Chemistry Department at Victoria University, was appointed in 1919 as the Cawthron Institute's first director and the first staff member hired.

=== 1920s ===
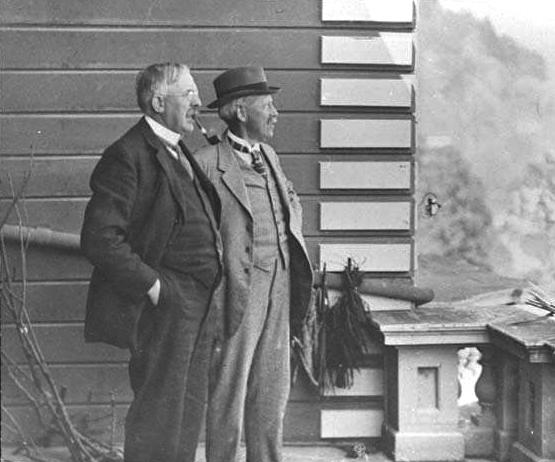
Sir Ernest Rutherford and Thomas Easterfield on the balcony of Cawthron Institute, 1925

Fellworth House was purchased in 1920 as the institute's temporary premises. It remained the home of Cawthron Institute for the following fifty years. On 21 April 1921, the institute was officially opened by New Zealand's Governor General, Lord Jellicoe. The Thomas Cawthron Trust Act 1924, formally establishing the Cawthron Institute Trust Board, came into force in early 1925. That year saw a visit by Ernest Rutherford who presented the Thomas Cawthron Memorial Lecture.

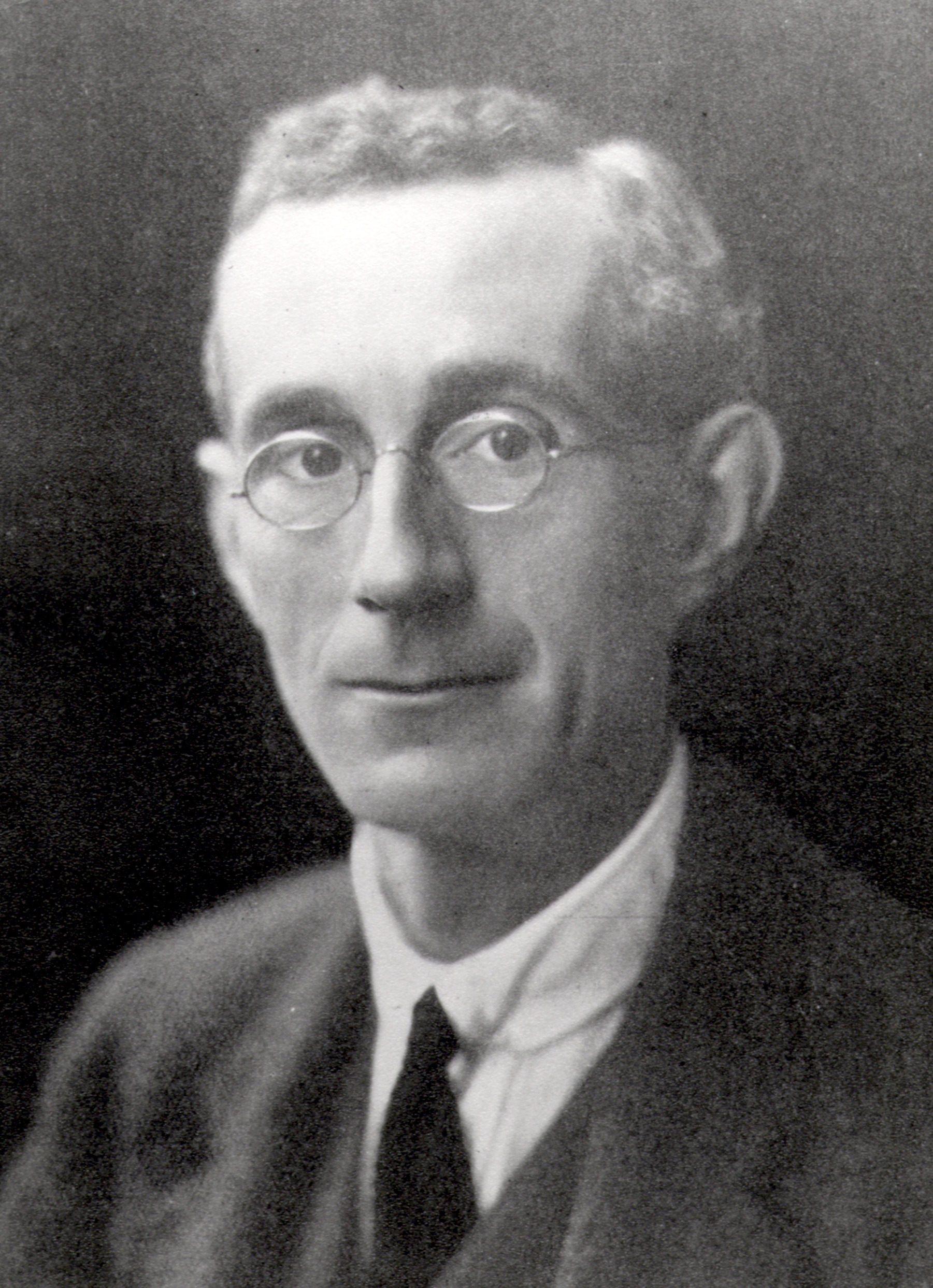
Robin J. Tillyard

In 1920, Robin Tillyard was appointed chief of the department of biology at Cawthron, and his 1926 book Insects of Australia and New Zealand became a reference for many decades. In 1927, Tillyard, then assistant director, left Cawthron to take up the position of chief of the Entomology Division at the CSIR, Australia.

=== 1930s ===
Foundation staff member Theodore Rigg was appointed director of a DSIR survey of volcanic ash soils in central North Island. Thomas Easterfield retired in 1933 and Rigg became Director. Finally, in 1936, the government approved compensation for the £40,000 death duties paid in 1917: an annual subsidy of £2000 for entomological, fruit, soil, and tobacco research.

In 1936, Cawthron scientists confirmed cobalt deficiency as the cause of “bush sickness” in New Zealand. The Cawthron Institute Trust Board Rating Exemption Act 1937 was enacted, granting the Cawthron Institute freedom from paying local rates. In that year, the Entomological Branch of the Department of Agriculture was transferred to Nelson: a joint venture between the DSIR and Cawthron.

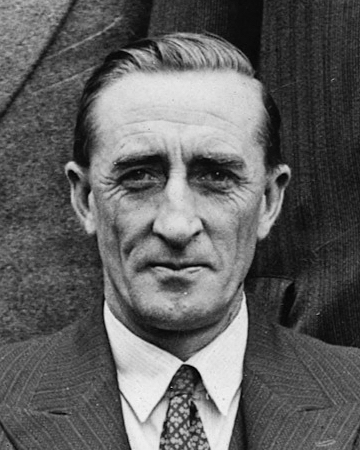
Sir Theodore Rigg

Theodore Rigg was knighted in 1937 for his services to New Zealand. In 1938, Thomas Easterfield also received a knighthood.

=== 1940s ===
The Knapp Collection of Māori taonga, comprising more than 8000 artifacts and the largest private collection in New Zealand, was bequeathed in 1940 to the Cawthron's museum. A Silver Jubilee commemorated 25 years of Cawthron's operation.

Cawthron's soil science activities, including the National Soil Survey, were relocated to the DSIR Soil Bureau, Wellington, along with staff.

=== 1950s ===
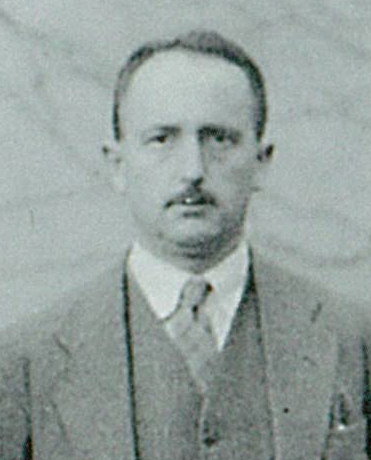
Cuthbert Barnicoat

This was a difficult decade for Cawthron. All entomology activities and collections were transferred to the DSIR Entomology Division, Auckland, in 1956. That same year Sir Theodore Rigg retired, and David Miller assumed the role of Director. Cawthron's Department of Mycology was transferred to the DSIR Plant Diseases Division, along with the reference collections and library. In 1959, Miller retired as Director and was replaced by Cuthbert Barnicoat, Associate Professor of Biochemistry at Massey Agricultural College.

=== 1960s ===
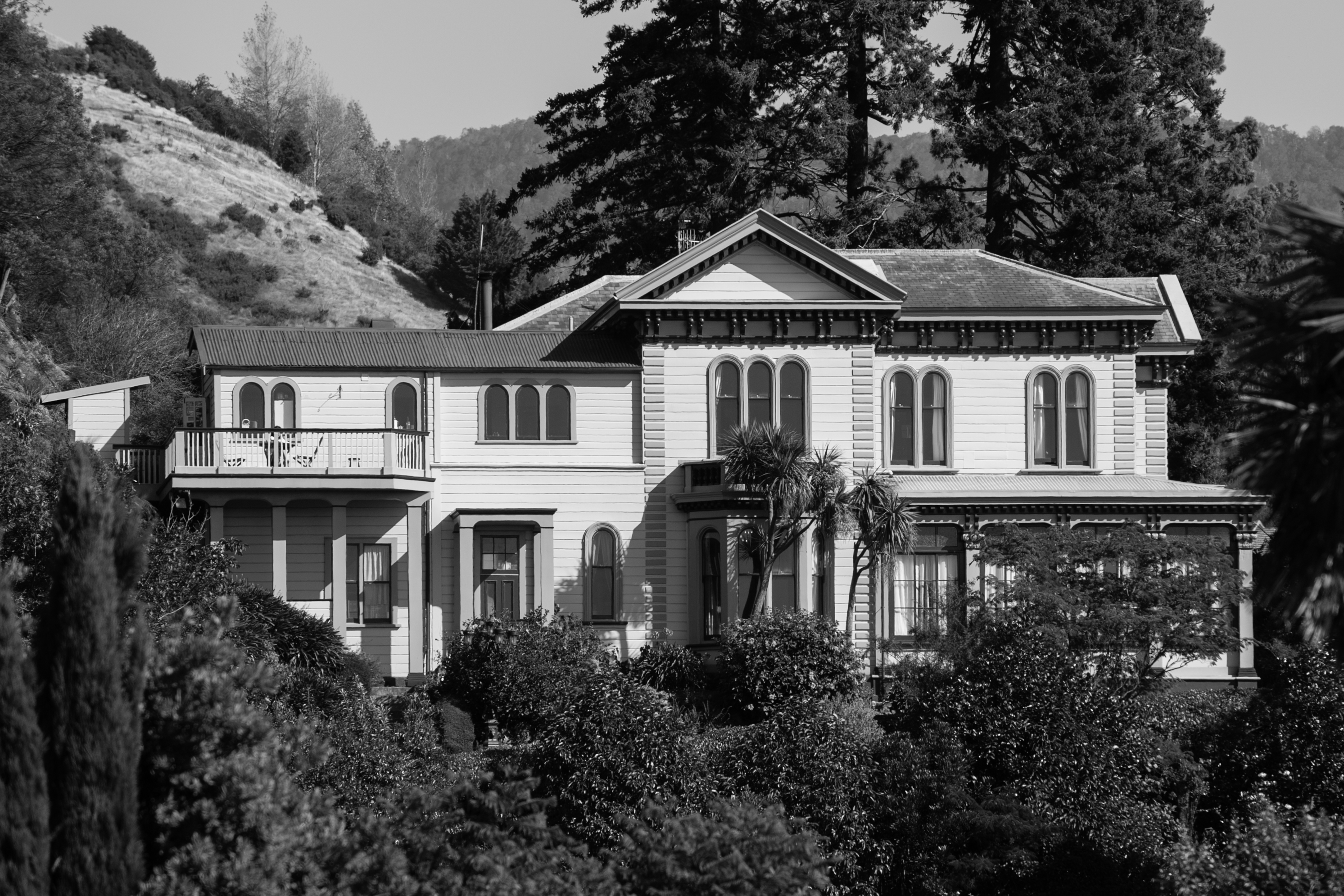
Fellworth House, Nelson, home to the Cawthron Institute 1920–1970

To address long-standing concerns about a lack of scientific expertise on the Cawthron Institute Trust Board, the Cawthron Institute Trust Act 1924 was amended to enable 3 additional trustees with scientific backgrounds to be added to the board by the Minister of Science. In 1967, Barnicoat retired as Director and was replaced in 1968 by E. B. (Barrie) Cousins, Associate Professor of Biochemistry at the University of Otago.

The Chemical Services Group was established under the leadership of Alan Cooke, for the first time offering commercial chemical and microbiological analyses. This provided an important source of revenue over the next decade.

=== 1970s ===
The decade began with the opening of new laboratories and offices (now named the Rigg building) by Governor-General Sir Arthur Porritt. Celebrations were marred by the sudden death of Director Barrie Cousins a few days before. Royd Thornton, manager of the DSIR's Agriculture and Biology Group, was appointed Director in 1971. In 1972, the national accreditation body TELARC was created, enabling other laboratories to gain accreditation and compete with Cawthron's highly regarded analytical laboratories. The Cawthron Museum was closed in 1976 and its contents redistributed to the Nelson Provincial Museum, other organisations, and the general public.

An Environmental and Feasibility Services group was established in 1976, offering commercial consulting services. The move from Fellworth House was completed in 1977, and the property was sold.

=== 1980s ===
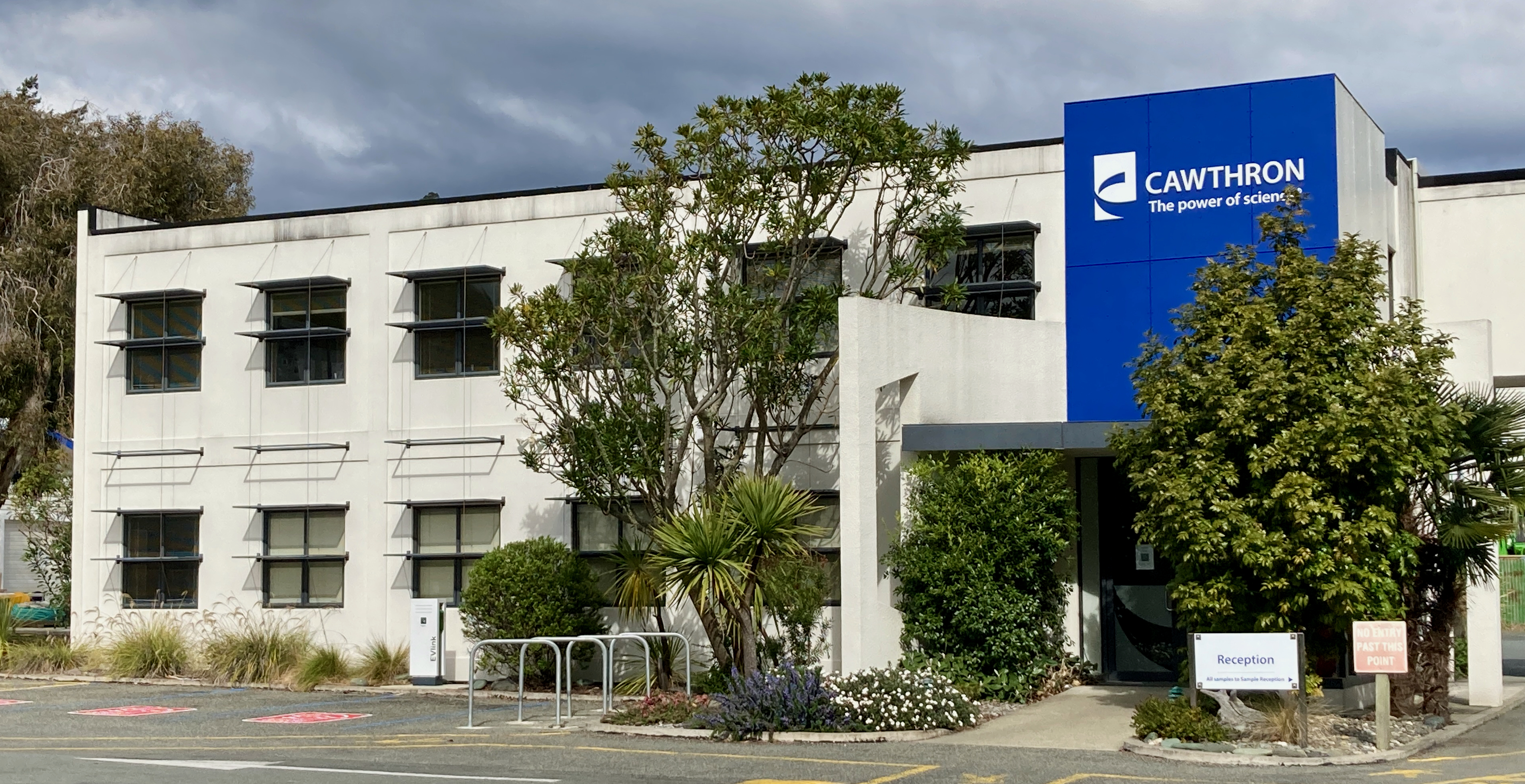
The Cawthron Institute today

The 1980s were a difficult decade for the Cawthron's finances; the Environmental and Feasibility Services group was shut down in 1984 after proving unprofitable. In 1987, Royd Thornton retired. Staff numbers declined to 33, from a decade peak of 74. Graeme Robertson, a chemical engineer with a background in the pulp and paper industry, was named chief executive officer in 1988. He appointed senior Cawthron scientist Henry Kaspar as Research Leader.

=== 1990s ===
A bipartisan agreement in 1990 led to a major restructuring of New Zealand's science system: the separation of policy, funding, and operations, and the creation of MoRST and FRST. This introduced competitive bidding for government-funded research programmes. The Thomas Cawthron Memorial Lecture series was restarted in 1990 after a 10-year hiatus. In 1992, Government research in MAF, DSIR, and Forestry was restructured into Crown Research Institutes.

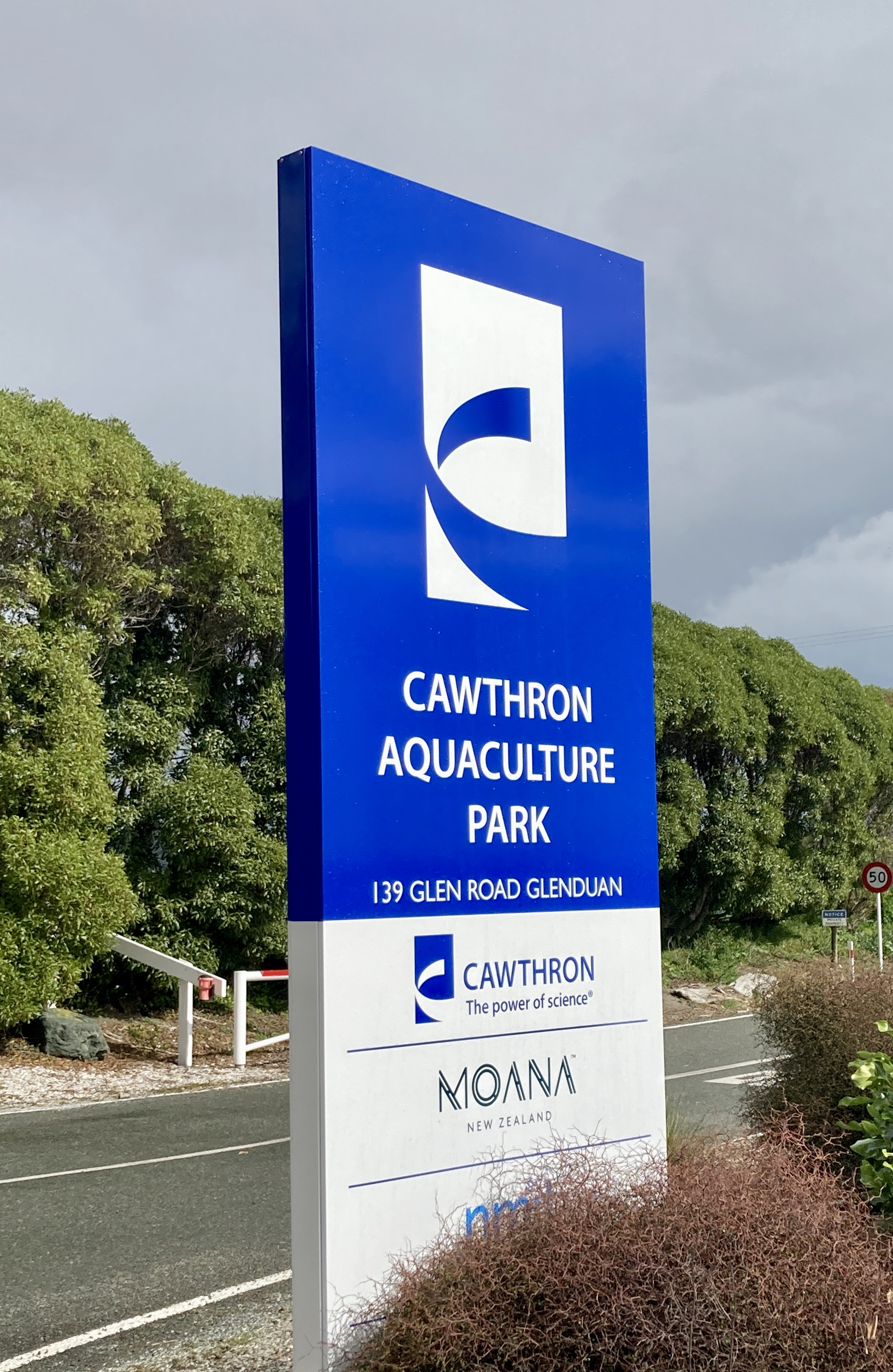
Cawthron Aquaculture Park entrance

In the summer of 1992–93 the first harmful algae bloom to close marine farms and create widespread public attention sparked interest in marine biotoxins. The Glenhaven Aquaculture Centre Ltd, now known as the Cawthron Aquaculture Park, was formed in 1993 as a joint venture with landowners, and a small research facility was built on the site of a former oyster hatchery.

Cawthron's Culture Collection of Micro-Algae was registered in 1996 as a nationally significant living collection. That year, the New Zealand aquaculture industry introduced regular phytoplankton monitoring of harvest areas as an early warning of the presence of toxic algae. In 1998, a new office building known as the Easterfield Wing was opened by the Minister of Science, Maurice Williamson. Cawthron hosted the first national workshop on marine biosecurity in 1999.

=== 2000s ===
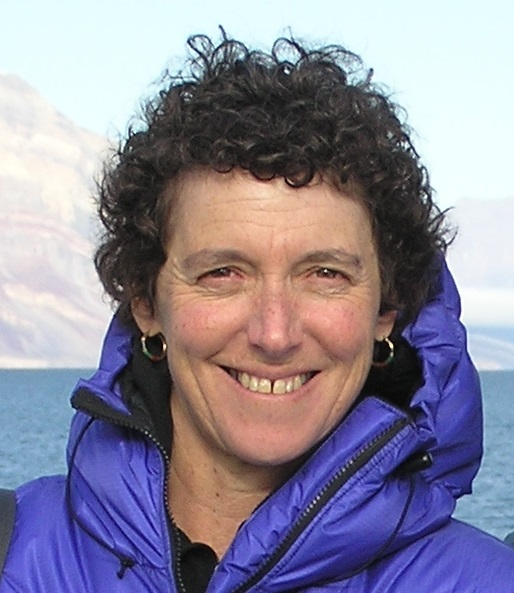
Gillian Wratt

HABTech 2000, an international workshop on technology for the monitoring of harmful algal blooms and biotoxins, was launched by Cawthron. That year LC-MS chemical analysis methods developed by Cawthron were introduced for routine marine biotoxin monitoring of farmed shellfish throughout New Zealand. Graeme Robertson resigned as CEO in 2005 and was replaced in 2006 by Gillian Wratt.

=== 2010s ===
Charles Eason joined the Cawthron Institute as CEO in June 2012.

=== 2020s ===
Charles Eason stepped down as CEO of the Cawthron Institute in December 2020 and was replaced by Volker Kuntzsch in March 2021.

== Current research ==
Cawthron has a number of research programmes supported by various government contestable funds, in particular the Endeavour Fund, focused in the following areas:

Seafood sector

An international team led by Cawthron is developing farming systems enabling multiple shellfish species to be grown in open ocean sites, with sustainable production efficiencies and maintenance costs. Research is underway to increase the sustainability and efficiency of the wild scampi capture fishery and explore new techniques for a land-based production of this high-value species. A study of the factors influencing the feed conversion efficiency of farmed Chinook salmon aims to improve husbandry, health and fish quality, while reducing environmental impacts.

Cawthron currently receives $5M annually as "capability funding" from the New Zealand Government's Strategic Science Investment Fund for 2 science platforms. The Shellfish Aquaculture Platform aims to enhance the sustainable growth of New Zealand's shellfish aquaculture industry through reliable seed supply, improved genetics, precision farming methods, new products and species and improved shellfish health.

The Seafood Safety Platform is led by Cawthron in partnership with AgResearch, Plant and Food Research and the Institute of Environmental Science and Research, to safeguard New Zealand's seafood export industry. It builds on relationships between researchers, regulators and the seafood sector. The research covers factors that drive harmful algal bloom events, molecular technologies for detection, marine biotoxin analysis, and threats from pathogenic bacteria and viruses.

Emerging organic contaminants pose a risk to New Zealand aquatic ecosystems, have the potential to induce antimicrobial resistance and may be present in food. Cawthron scientists lead a research programme to enhance management of these risks, in partnership with other science providers, iwi, key community stakeholders, environmental managers and policy makers.

Marine bioactives and nutrition

In a programme funded through the government's "High Value Nutrition" National Science Challenge, Cawthron and Sanford Limited have joined forces to identify and validate the health benefits of Greenshell mussels. The programme will assist the development of high value functional food products.

To tap into the growing interest worldwide in pharmaceuticals based on natural compounds of algal origin, a new programme “Natural compound manipulation for therapeutic applications” began in 2019. This builds on Cawthron's long experience in algae research and the extraction of bioactive compounds, the Cawthron Institute Culture Collection of Microalgae and the new National Algae Research Centre.

Freshwater ecosystem health

LAWA, "Land Air Water Aotearoa", a partnership between Regional Councils, Cawthron Institute and the Ministry for the Environment, is one of New Zealand's largest environmental online data platforms, connecting New Zealanders with their environment through sharing scientific data.

Lakes380, "Our lakes’ health: past, present and future" an international effort jointly led by GNS Science and Cawthron Institute, aims to obtain a nationwide health overview for 10% of New Zealand's 3800 lakes. As well as characterising present biodiversity and water quality, the team is exploring how and why the lakes have changed over the past 1000 years by collecting and analysing sediment cores. The information is interwoven with traditional Māori knowledge to provide a richer understanding about the value and health of New Zealand's lakes, as well as the impact of natural and human activity.

The health of our oceans

In a new research programme Cawthron leads a multidisciplinary team to develop a new “marine biosecurity toolbox”. Their aim is to prevent marine pests getting a foothold by developing molecular tools to detect them at low densities, and with simulation models assist managers achieve better resource allocation. The project team has participants from over 20 organisations: government, Maori, industry, and education providers.

The design and synthesis of a “smart” antifouling biocide is the aim of another project. Antifouling compounds must be potent against problematic biofouling organisms when applied to artificial surfaces in the sea but benign against marine life if released into the environment, as well as cost-effective to synthesize at an industrial scale.

Knowledge and toolsets to support co-management of estuaries "Manaaki Taha Moana: Oranga Taiao, Oranga Tangata". Archived from the original on 14 January 2020.

== Cawthron Aquaculture Park ==
This national centre for shellfish aquaculture research began in 1993 as a collection of recycled huts and a tunnel house. Earlier decades had seen many unsuccessful attempts by New Zealand scientists to grow Greenshell mussels in a hatchery. A government-backed research project provided the funding for a small research hatchery and success was achieved in 1999. Eighteen years later, a new company, SPATnz Ltd, was formed by three major mussel producers to breed Greenshell mussels on a commercial scale.

== Achievements, awards and recognition ==
=== Species named after the Cawthron Institute ===
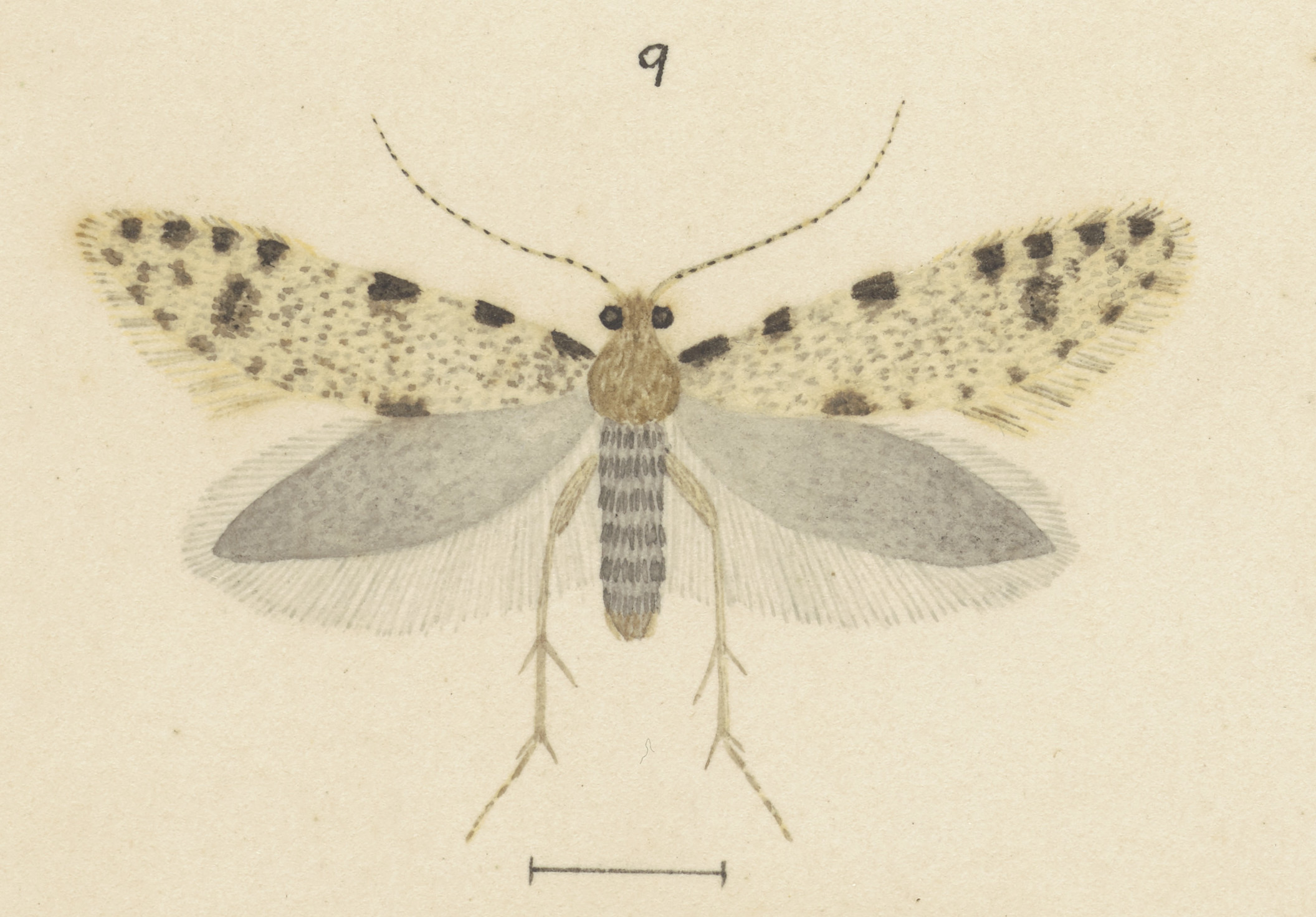
Reductoderces cawthronella.

The moth species Reductoderces cawthronella was named in honour of the Cawthron Institute, commemorating it being the first new species to be reared at the Cawthron Institute insectarium.

== See also ==
- Lesley Rhodes
- Susie Wood

== Sources ==
- "Cawthron Institute", from Tuatara: Volume 02, Issue 1, March 1949
- "Cawthron Institute", from An Encyclopaedia of New Zealand, edited by A. H. McLintock, originally published in 1966.
