= Wellington Girls' College =

- Te Kāreti Kōtiro o Te Whanganui-a-Tara
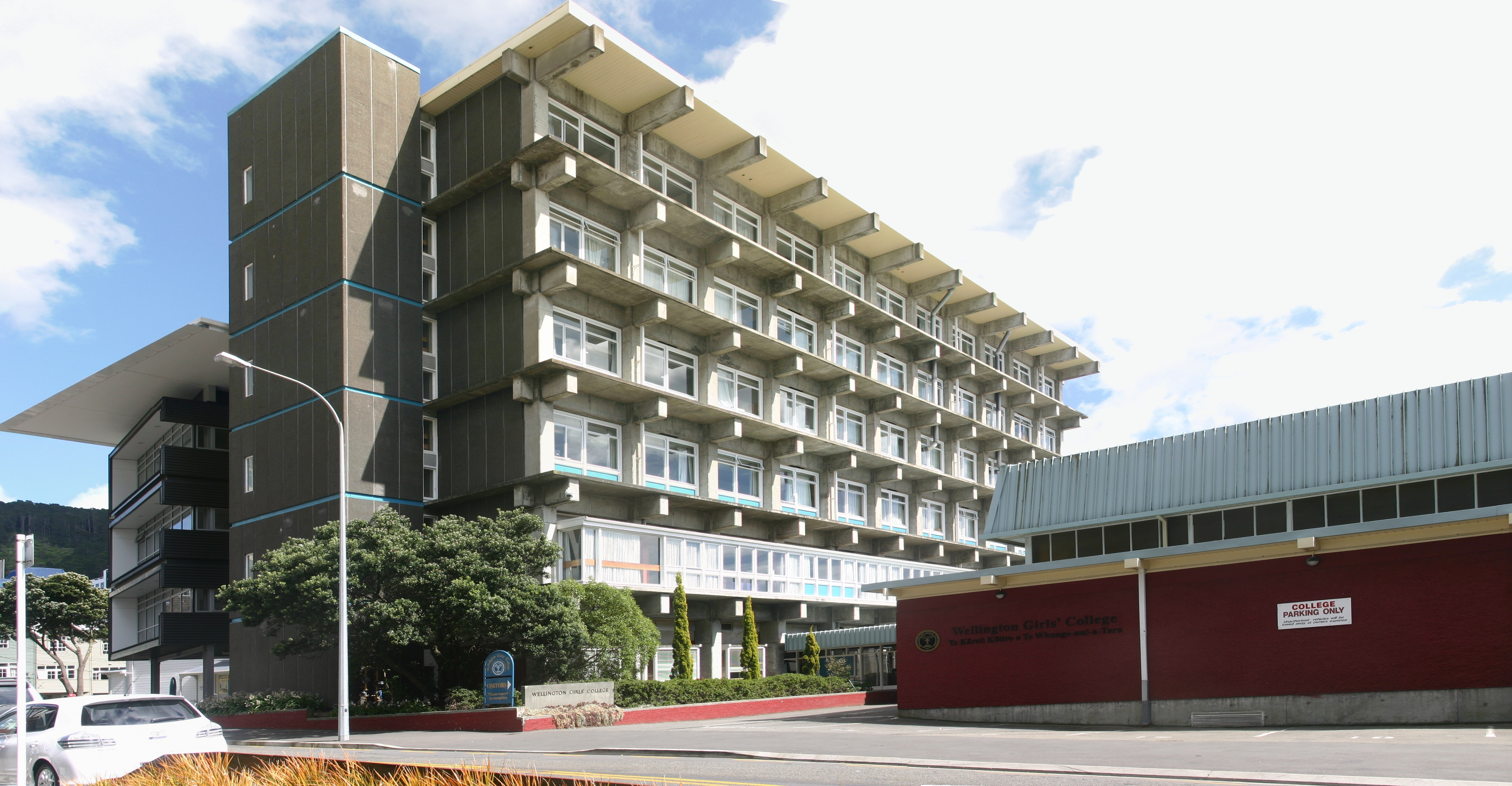
- Wellington Girls' College from Pipitea Street

Location
- Pipitea Street, Thorndon, Wellington, New Zealand; 41.2748°S 174.7806°E

Information
- Type: State Single Sex (Girls) Secondary School (Year 9–13)
- Motto: Lumen Accipe et Imperti "Receive the light and pass it on"
- Established: 1883
- Ministry of Education Institution no.: 272
- Principal: Julia Davidson
- Enrolment: 1,425 (July 2026)
- Colors: Teal; Black; Gold
- Mascot: The Teal Seal
- Socio-economic decile: 10Z
- Yearbook: The Reporter
- Website: wgc.school.nz

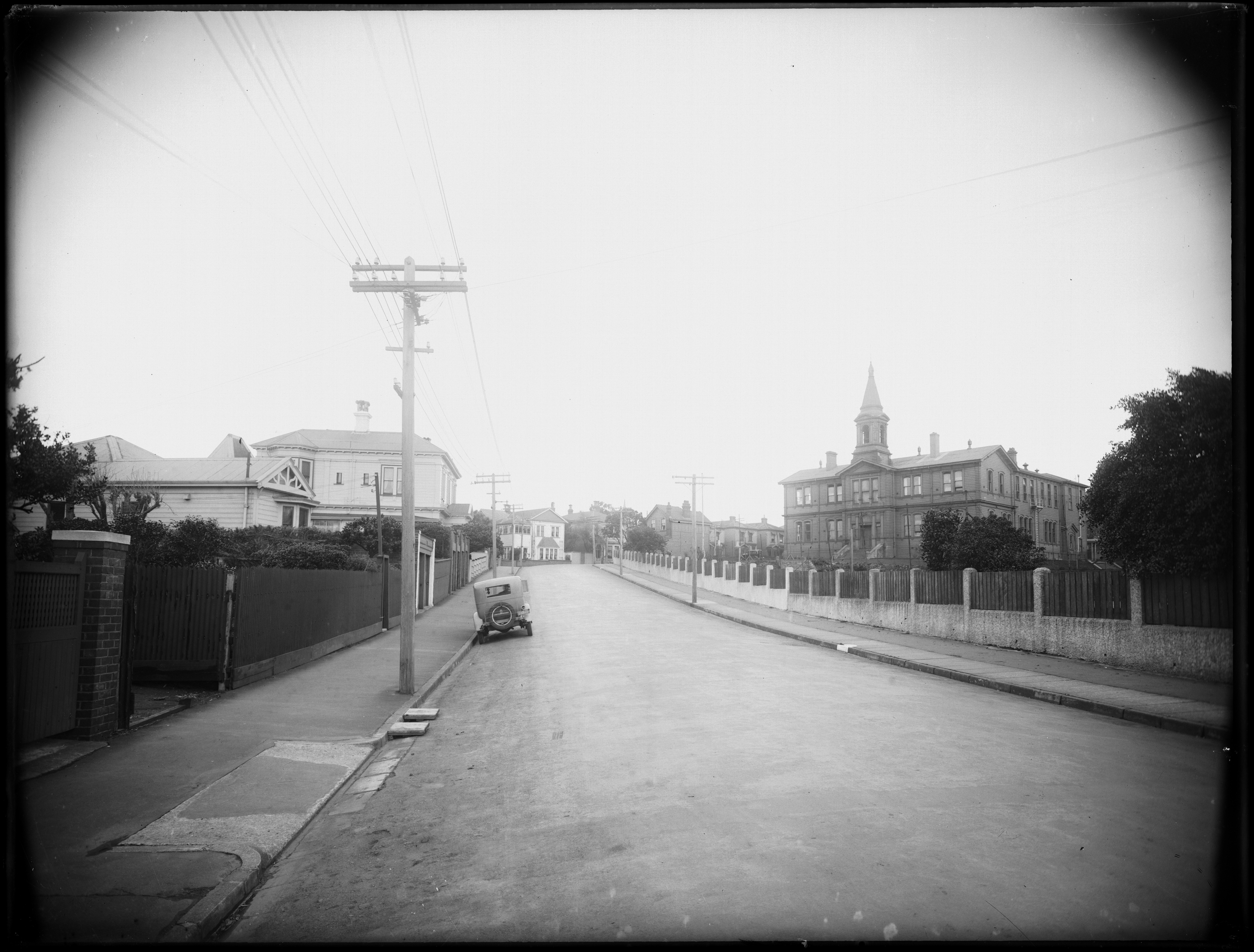
View from Moturoa Street circa 1935

Wellington Girls' College was founded in 1883 in Wellington, New Zealand. At that time it was called Wellington Girls' High School. Wellington Girls' College is a year 9 to 13 single-sex state secondary school, located in Thorndon in central Wellington.

== History ==
Seeing a need for higher education for girls the founding fathers of Wellington College leased a building in Abel Smith Street in 1882 and appointed Miss Martha Hamilton as the Lady Principal of the school. The school opened on 2 February 1883 with 40 pupils. However, by the end of its first year the roll had increased to almost 100 girls, and when the Premier, the Rt. Hon. Robert Stout visited the school in 1884 the building was overcrowded with 130 students. As a result of his visit the school was moved to its current site in Pipitea Street.

The new school site between Pipitea Street and Hobson Street was known as Hospital Reserve. Wellington's first public hospital, the Colonial Hospital, had been built on the site in 1847 but was destroyed by an earthquake in 1848. It was replaced by a new building in 1855, and closed when Wellington Hospital opened in 1881 in Newtown.

A new school building was erected in 1887. Described by Member of Parliament Henry Scotland as "extravagant" and "eccentric", it was built of wood and had a turret. This building has since been demolished and a variety of other buildings have been constructed for the school. A six-storey concrete tower block of classrooms was completed in 1970. Brook Block was built in 1941, had two floors added in 1994 and was extended in 2002. It was declared earthquake-prone and in 2025–2026 was refurbished and strengthened. A major building programme was undertaken from 2024.

Wellington Girls' College operates an enrolment zone which takes in most of Wellington as far as Khandallah to the north, Willis Street to the east and to the south coast. Students living in Wellington's eastern suburbs are zoned for Wellington East Girls' College which was opened at Mount Victoria in 1925 as the population of Wellington's southern and eastern suburbs had grown and Wellington Girls' College became overcrowded.

== Notable alumnae ==
=== The arts ===
- Fleur Adcock – poet
- Isobel Andrews – playwright, novelist, short-story writer and poet
- Sylvia Ashton-Warner – writer, poet and educator
- Leigh Brewer – dancer and choreographer
- Vidyamala Burch – writer and mindfulness teacher
- Joe Cotton – pop singer
- Anne French – editor and poet
- Rebecca Gibney – actor
- Robin Hyde – poet, novelist, biographer and journalist
- Annabel Langbein – celebrity cook, food writer and publisher
- Katherine Mansfield – writer
- Elizabeth McRae – actor
- Marjory Nicholls – poet
- Anna Paquin – actor
- Beverley Randell – children's author
- Jo Randerson – writer, playwright, theatre director and performer
- Fran Walsh – screenwriter and film producer
- Bridget Williams – publisher

=== Public service ===
- Nellie Coad – teacher, community leader, writer
- Cathy Dewes – Māori language advocate, educator
- Winnie Laban – politician
- Margaret Shields – politician

=== Science and medicine ===
- Elaine Gurr – doctor
- Helen Deem – doctor
- Theodora Clemens Hall – doctor
- Ocean Mercier – scientist
- Marion Robinson – professor of nutrition
- Dianne Sika–Paotonu – immunologist

=== Sports ===
- Gina Crampton – netball player
- Tegan Graham – basketball player
- Beth Jurgeleit – hockey player
- Jackie Kiddle – rower
- Trish McKelvey – cricketer
- Melissa Moon – athlete
- Thamsyn Newton – cricketer
- Rebecca Perrott – swimmer
- Sarah Tetzlaff – competition climber and Olympian
- Jade Wilson – squash player

== Notable staff ==
- Airini Beautrais – poet
- Edith Searle Grossmann – novelist and journalist
- Edith Howes – writer and educationalist

=== Principals ===
	Principal	Period
1	Martha Hamilton	1883–1900
2	Mary McLean	1900–1926
3	Violet Greig	1926–1938
4	Esther North	1938–1950
5	Maida Clark	1950–1958
6	Betty Fraser	1958–1978
7	Elaine Barnett	1978–1995
–	Kath Kelly (acting)	1995
8	Ngaire Newton	1995–1996
–	Kath Kelly (acting)	1996–1997
9	Marg McLeod	1997–2006
–	Denise Johnson (acting)	2006–2007
10	Julia Davidson	2008–present
