= Anne French =

New Zealand poet

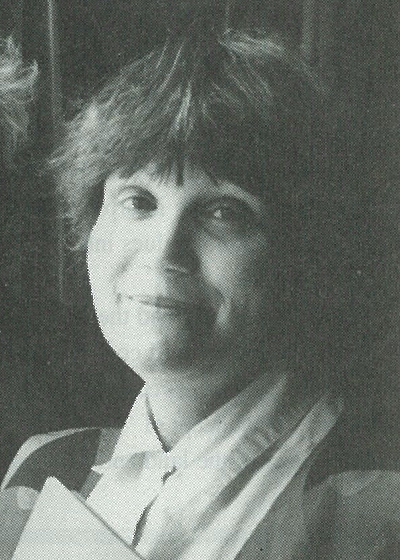
French in 1993

Anne French (born 1956) is a New Zealand editor and poet.

== Life ==
Anne French was born in Wellington, New Zealand. She graduated from Wellington Girls' College and Victoria University of Wellington with a research MA. Initially she worked as Literary Editor for Oxford University Press, becoming New Zealand Managing Editor in 1982, and subsequently New Zealand Publisher.

She was Managing Editor of New Zealand Strategic Management, a refereed business journal published by the New Zealand Strategic Management Society, from 1994 - 2000.

In 1995 she set up Te Papa Press, a publishing business within the Commercial Division of the Museum of New Zealand Te Papa Tongarewa.

In 2002, she switched careers from publishing to research funding. She worked for the government's principal research funding agency, the Foundation for Research, Science, and Technology, initially as Strategy Manager, subsequently becoming Acting Policy Manager (and writing her first BIM). She then became International Relationships Manager. She was responsible for developing funder-to-funder agreements with funders in North Asian countries, managing a $15 m fund to stimulate international research collaborations in key areas, and helping to build research collaborations between NZ researchers and those in Korea, Japan, and China. This work had some long-term consequences: a robotics collaboration between researchers at the University of Auckland and at ETRI, a Korean institute, that lasted more than a decade; and a strong interest in Korean history and literature, especially C20 Korean poetry, and also Chinese poetry of the Tang dynasty.

In 2007, French left FRST intending to do more ocean racing, but instead built up her professional practice in research consulting and research development. www.annefrenchconsultin

Her most recent book is The Blue Voyage, AUP. Recent creative work can be found at Substack. https://annefrench.substack.com/

== Awards ==
- 1973 and 1974 PEN Young Writer’s Incentive Award
- 1988 New Zealand Book Award for Poetry
- 1988 PEN Best First Book of Poetry Award
- 1993 Inaugural Writer in Residence, Massey University

== Works ==
- "He mihimihi; Seeking the Wild". Cortland Review. August 2002.
- All Cretans are Liars. Auckland University Press. 1987. ISBN 978-1-86940-013-2.
- The Male as Evader (1988)
- Cabin Fever (1990)
- Seven Days on Mykonos (1993).
- Boys' Night Out. Auckland University Press. 1998. ISBN 978-1-86940-189-4.
- Wild. Auckland University Press. 2004. ISBN 978-1-86940-310-2.
- The Blue Voyage (2015)

=== Contributor ===
- Ian Hamilton, ed. (1994). Oxford Companion to Twentieth Century Poetry. Oxford University Press. ISBN 978-0-19-866147-4.

=== Anthologies ===
- Roger Robinson; Nelson Wattie, eds. (1998). Oxford Companion to New Zealand Literature. Oxford University Press. ISBN 978-0-19-558348-9.
- Jack Ross; Jan Kemp, eds. (2007). Contemporary NZ Poets in Performance. Auckland: Auckland University Press. ISBN 978-1-86940-395-9.
