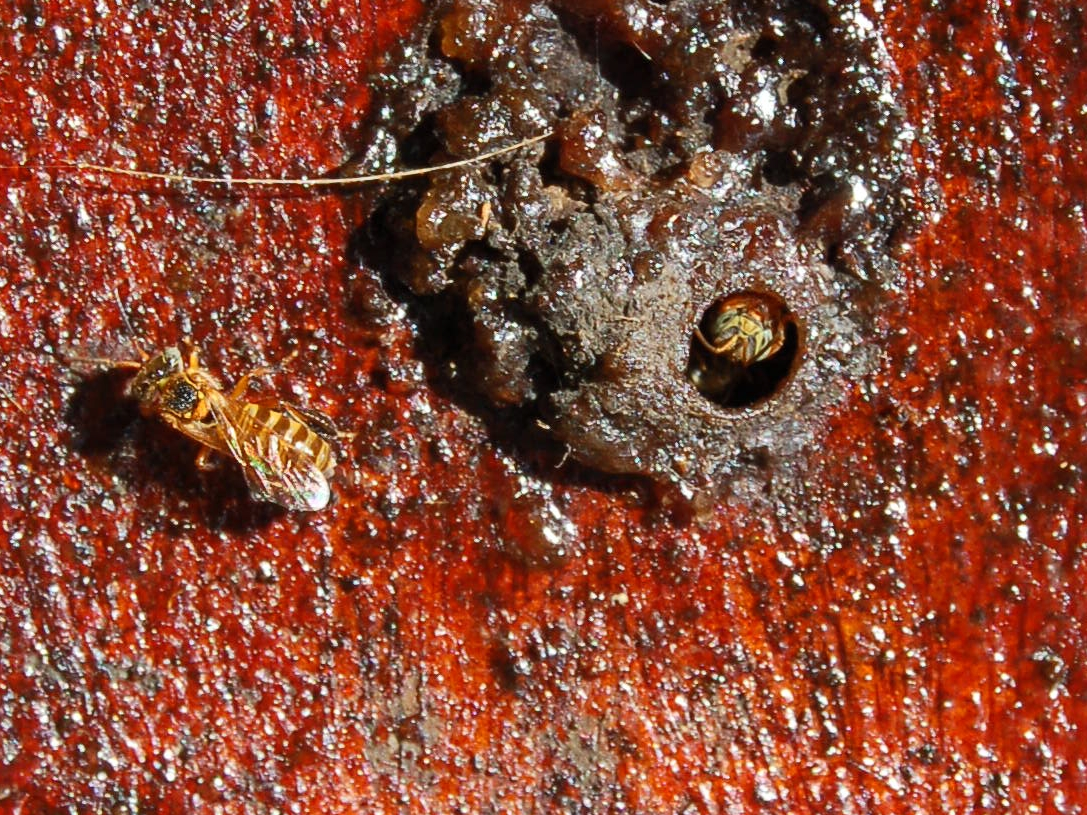
- A Frieseomelitta varia guard bee standing next to the nest entrance

Scientific classification
- Domain: Eukaryota
- Kingdom: Animalia
- Phylum: Arthropoda
- Class: Insecta
- Order: Hymenoptera
- Family: Apidae
- Clade: Corbiculata
- Tribe: Meliponini
- Genus: Frieseomelitta; Ihering, 1912

= Frieseomelitta =

Genus of bees

Frieseomelitta is a stingless bee (Meliponini) genus in the family Apidae. It currently contains about 16 described species:

- Frieseomelitta dispar
- Frieseomelitta doederleini
- Frieseomelitta flavicornis
- Frieseomelitta francoi
- Frieseomelitta freiremaiai
- Frieseomelitta languida
- Frieseomelitta lehmanni
- Frieseomelitta longipes
- Frieseomelitta meadewaldoi
- Frieseomelitta nigra
- Frieseomelitta paranigra
- Frieseomelitta paupera
- Frieseomelitta portoi
- Frieseomelitta silvestrii
- Frieseomelitta trichocerata
- Frieseomelitta varia

== Bibliography ==
- Wolf Engels (Editor): Social Insects: An Evolutionary Approach to Castes and Reproduction, Springer Science & Business Media, Dec 6, 2012 - 265 pages. ISBN 978-3-642-74490-7. Here: Chapter 7: Wolf Engels, Vera L. Imperatriz-Fonseca: Caste Development, Reproductive Strategies, and Control of Fertility in Honey Bees and Stingless Bees, 4.3 Young Queens in the Multigynous Stingless Bee Nest, p186
