= Theodora Hall =

New Zealand doctor

Theodora Clemens Hall (née Easterfield; 12 June 1902 – 19 December 1980) was a New Zealand medical doctor and the second New Zealand woman to become a member of the Royal College of Physicians. Early in her career she worked at Wellington Hospital and then at Cook Hospital in Gisborne.

== Early life and education ==
She was born in Wellington, New Zealand on 12 June 1902. She was the fourth of five children. Her father was Thomas Easterfield, a professor of chemistry and physics at Victoria University of Wellington, and her sister Dr Helen Deem. Hall attended Wellington Girls' College, where she represented Wellington in hockey, also doing well in swimming and tennis. She graduated MB ChB from the University of Otago in 1926, having lived at St Margaret's College.

== Career ==
Hall began her career as a house surgeon at Wellington Hospital, followed by two years as a registrar at Cook Hospital in Gisborne. She did post-graduate study in London in the early 1930s, at King's College, gaining her MRCP diploma in 1932. She was the second New Zealand woman to obtain the MRCP. She was appointed to Cook Hospital in Gisborne in 1935. In 1932 she married Dr Richard John Burnside Hall (1894–1986) who was surgeon superintendent at Cook Hospital. As surgeon and physician they were described as "the backbone of the Cook Hospital medical service".

The Halls moved to Paihia in 1958 when Richard retired but Theodora, aged 54 at that time, continued to work as a physician at the Bay of Islands Hospital, and developed an interest in rheumatology. She held that role until 1971.

== Personal life ==
The Halls had three daughters. Hall died in 1980, aged 78, and her husband eight years later.
