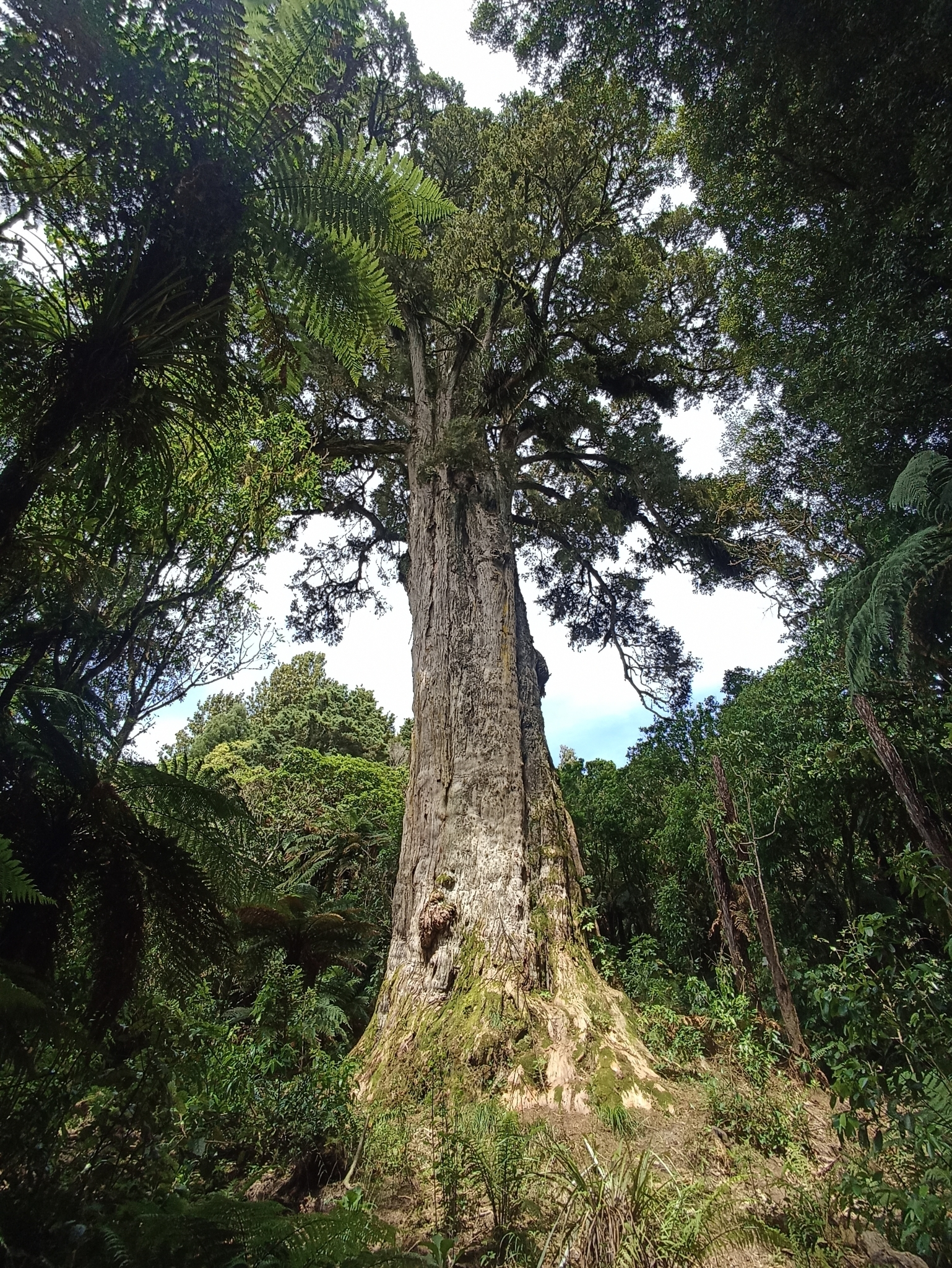
- A tōtara in Mangakino, New Zealand

Conservation status
- Least Concern (IUCN 3.1)

Scientific classification
- Kingdom: Plantae
- Clade: Tracheophytes
- Clade: Gymnosperms
- Division: Pinophyta
- Class: Pinopsida
- Order: Araucariales
- Family: Podocarpaceae
- Genus: Podocarpus
- Species: P. totara

Binomial name
- Podocarpus totara G.Benn. ex D.Don

Synonyms
- Nageia totara (G.Benn. ex D.Don) F.Muell.; Podocarpus totara subsp. waihoensis (Wardle) Silba; Podocarpus totara var. waihoensis Wardle; Podocarpus variegatus Paxton & Lindl.

= Podocarpus totara =

Tōtara

Species of conifer

Podocarpus totara (/ˈtoʊtərə/), the tōtara, is a species of coniferous tree in the family Podocarpaceae, endemic to New Zealand. Found across New Zealand, the tree can grow up to a height of 35 m (115 ft), and is known for its longevity.

The wood of tōtara is rot-resistant, and prized in Māori culture, and was often used as a material to create large-scale waka.

== Description ==
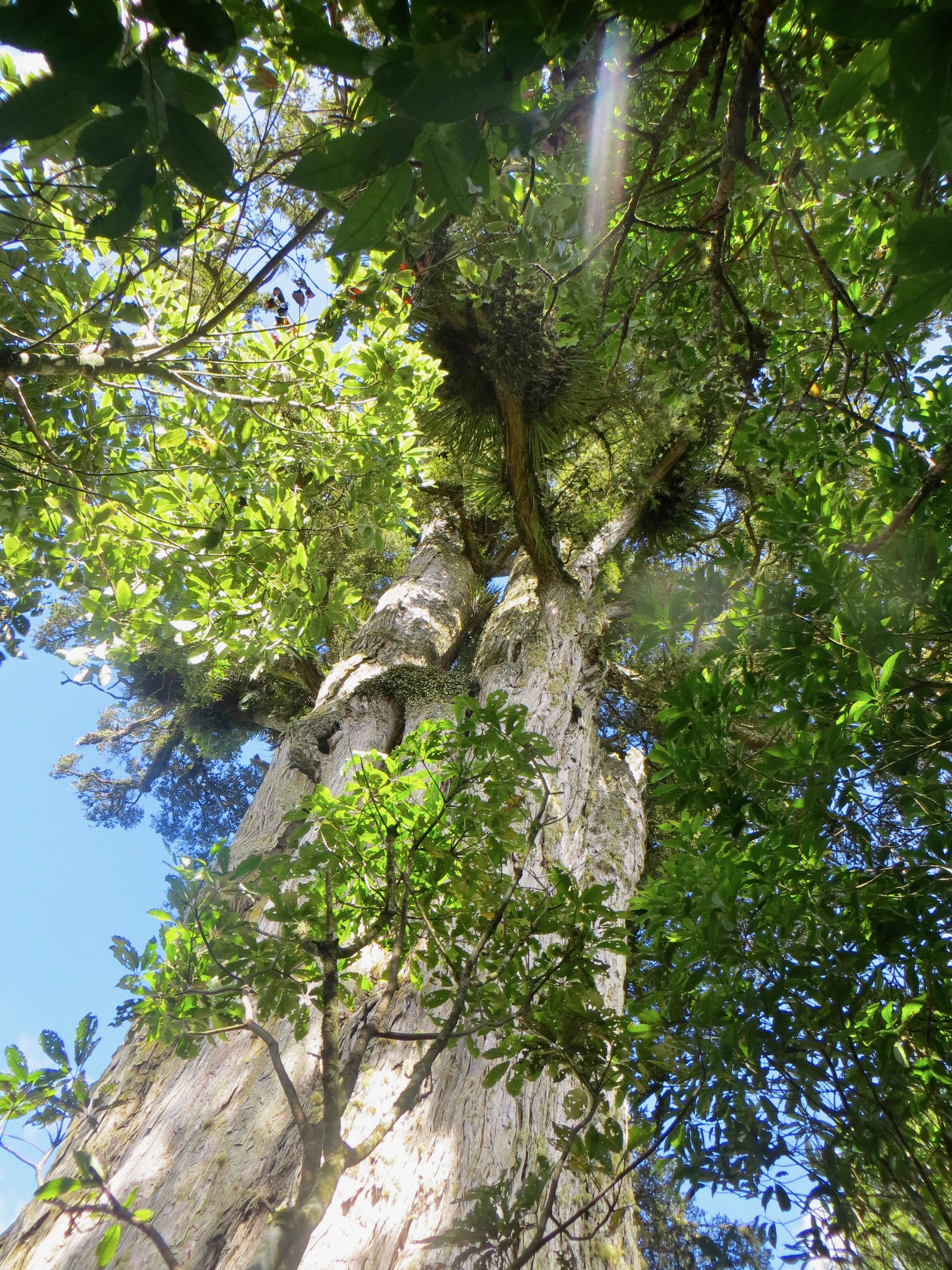
Largest known living tōtara, the Pouakani Tree

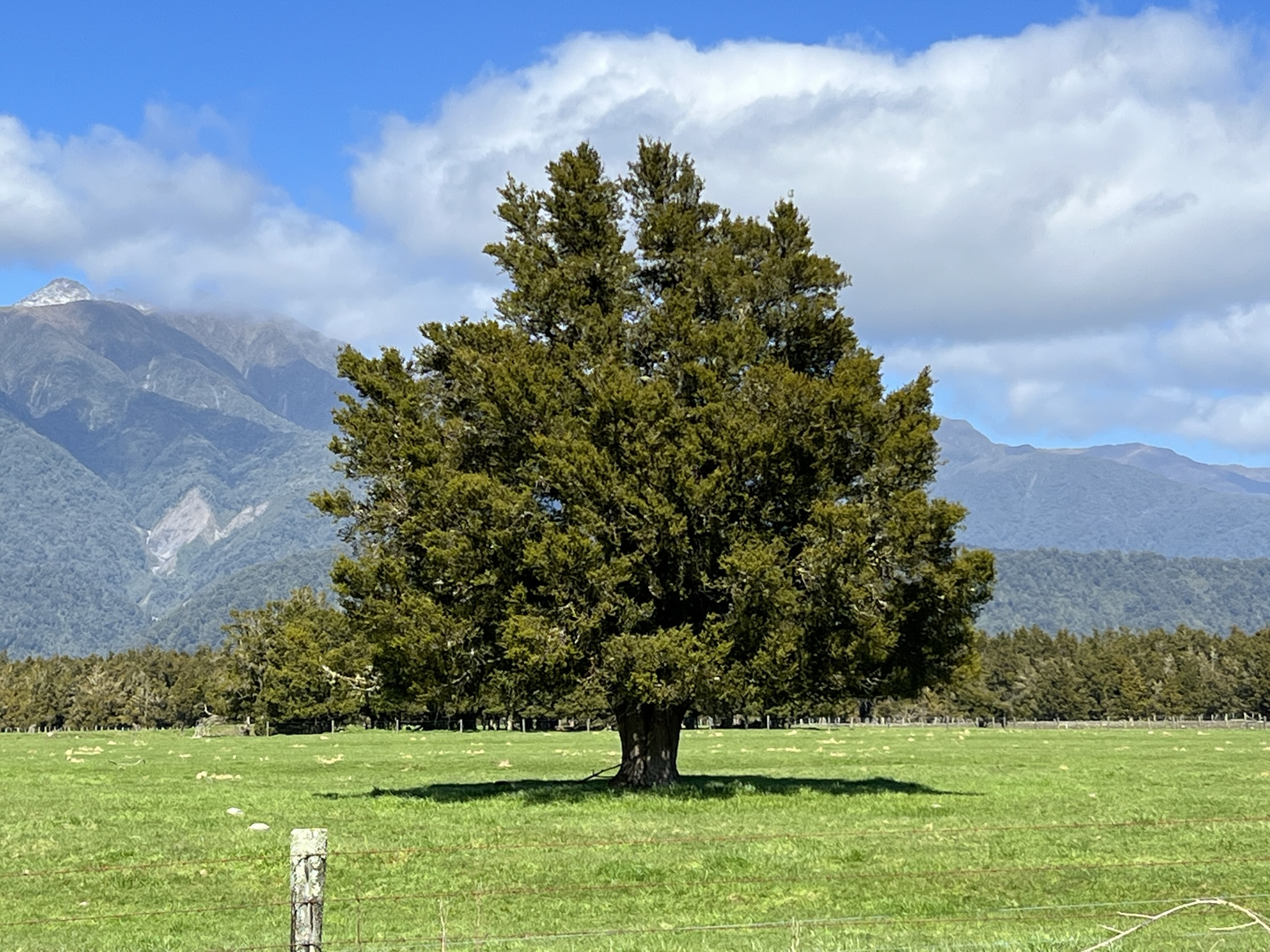
A tōtara growing on farmland, Cook Flat, West Coast

The tōtara is a medium to large tree, which grows slowly to around 20 to 25 metres (66 to 82 feet) exceptionally to 35 m (115 ft); it is noted for its longevity and the great girth of its trunk. The bark peels off in papery flakes, with a purplish to golden brown hue. The sharp, dull-green, needle-like leaves are stiff and leathery, 2 cm (0.79 in) long. This plant produces highly modified cones with two to four fused, fleshy, berry-like, juicy scales, bright red when mature. The cone contains one or two rounded seeds at the apex of the scales.

The largest known living tōtara, the Pouakani Tree, near Pureora in the central North Island, is over 35 m (115 ft) tall and nearly 4 m (13 ft) in trunk diameter at breast height. Bushmen discovered it in 1950. Other large trees are known in this area, while Whirinaki Forest, to the east, but also on deep recent volcanic soils, has groves of very tall tōtara (over 40 m (130 ft) in height).

== Taxonomy ==
The first informal description of Podocarpus totara was by Australian naturalist George Bennett in 1832, published as an appendix to Aylmer Bourke Lambert's third edition second volume of A Description of the Genus Pinus. When the species was formally described by David Don, he used Bennett's binomial name.

The two varieties of tōtara are:

- Podocarpus totara var. totara
- Podocarpus totara var. waihoensis

Podocarpus totara var. waihoensis, also known as the Westland tōtara, is a variety found in the West Coast Region of the South Island, approximately south from the Waiho River. The variety is not recognised by some authors, and it may potentially be a hybrid of Podocarpus totara and Podocarpus acutifolius. Plants of the World Online considers var. waihoensis a synonym of P. totara.

== Etymology ==
Its Māori name comes from the Proto-Polynesian word *tootara (related to the word tara lit. 'thorn') which when passed down to descendant languages refer to spiny creatures, especially the porcupinefish (Diodon hystrix) due to its spiky leaves. The species epithet totara comes from the Māori language name. The spelling "totara" without the tohutō is also common in English.

== Distribution and habitat ==
Podocarpus totara is found in both the North Island and the South Island, growing in both lowland, montane and lower subalpine habitats, at elevations of up to 600 metres (2,000 feet) It is rarely found on Stewart Island / Rakiura. Tōtara is commonly found in lowland areas where the soil is fertile and well drained.

Tōtara is often found regenerating on farmland, as it is not eaten by livestock. Tōtara is so commonly found on Northland farms that some farmers consider the tree to be a weed.

== Related trees ==
In a classic example of Antarctic flora species-pair the tōtara is very closely related to Podocarpus nubigenus from South America, to the extent that if planted together, they are very difficult to distinguish. The best distinction is the grey-green tone of the leaves, compared to the slightly brighter green of P. nubigenus.

== Cultivation ==
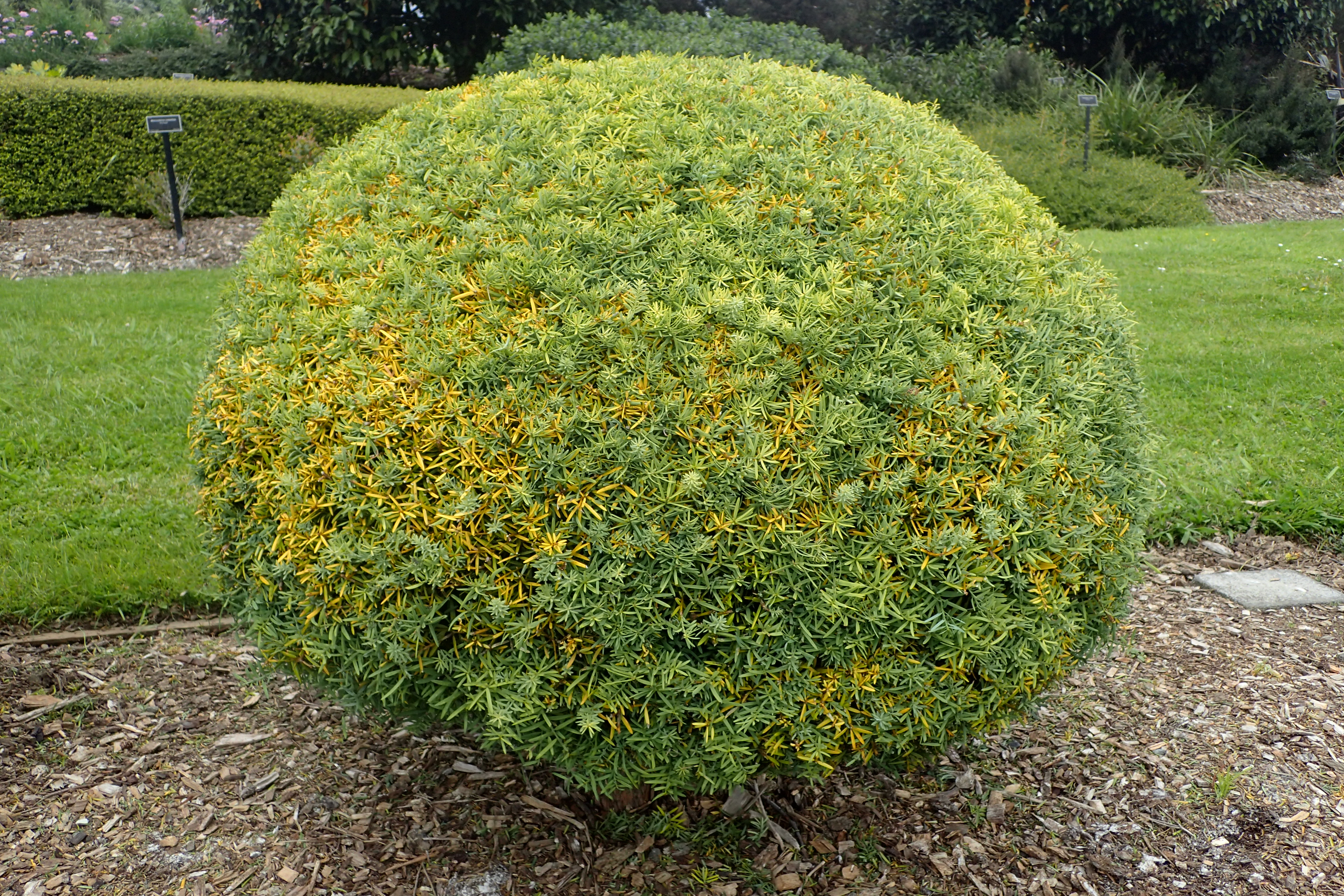
'Albany Gold' cultivar

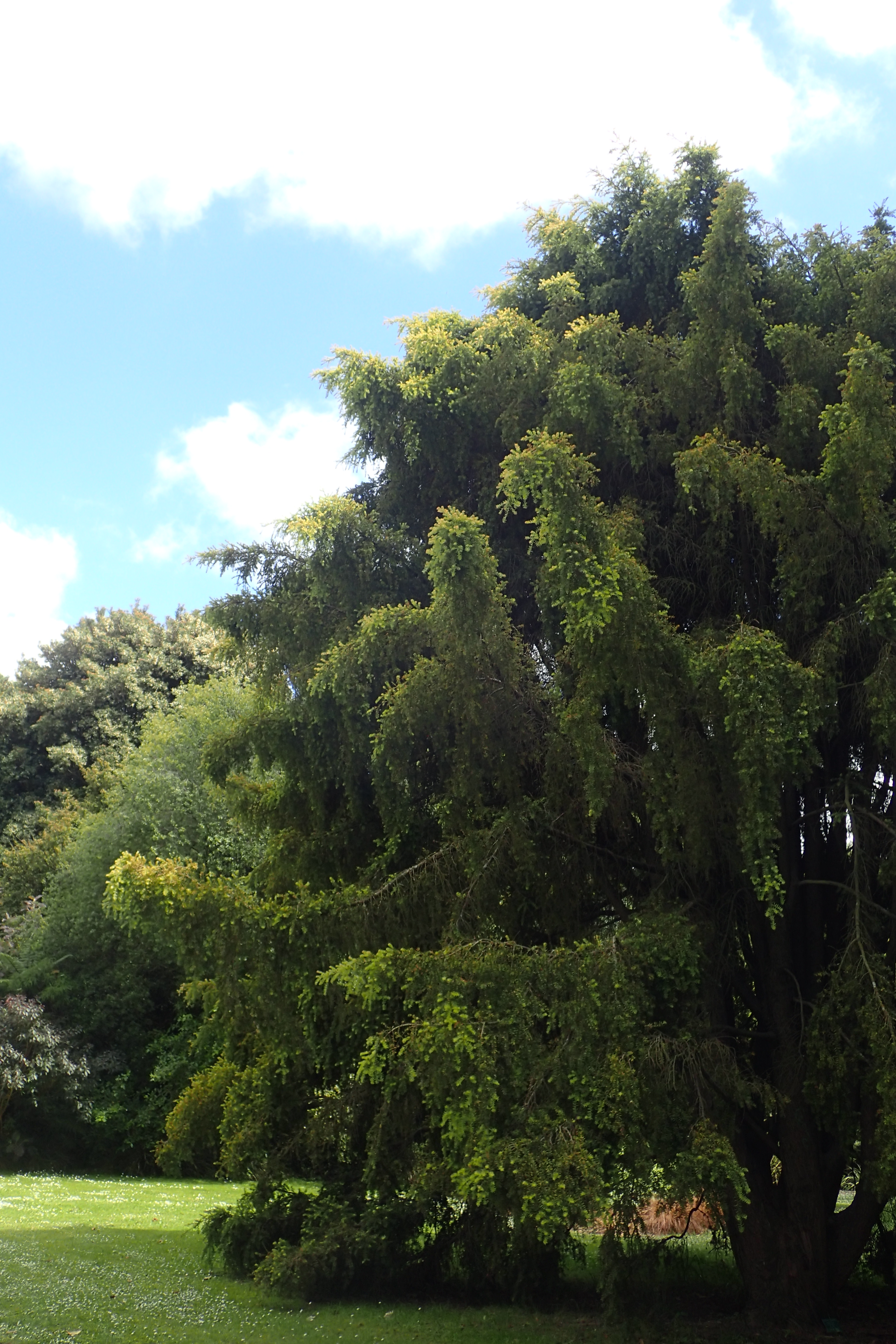
'Pendula' cultivar

Tōtara grows easily from fresh seed and cuttings. It has been planted in the United Kingdom as far north as Inverewe, Scotland.

Several cultivars for garden use have been introduced. These include 'Albany Gold' and 'Aurea', both have yellow 'gold' foliage that darkens in winter; 'Pendula', which has a weeping growth habit that is especially pronounced in young plants; 'Silver Falls', also pendulous but with cream-edged foliage; and 'Matapouri Blue', which has a conical form and glaucous foliage.

== Human use ==
The wood is hard, straight-grained, and very resistant to rot, especially its heartwood. Due to its durability, tōtara wood was often used for fence posts, floor pilings, and railway sleepers. It is also prized for its carving properties, and was the primary wood used in Māori carving. It was the primary wood used to make waka (canoes) in traditional Māori boat building due to its relatively light weight (about 25% lighter than kauri), long, straight lengths, and natural oils in the wood that help prevent rotting. Tōtara could be drilled with chert points to make holes near the edges of the timber without splitting. In larger tōtara waka, three or more sections were laced together with flax rope. A tōtara waka took at least a year to make using stone adzes.

During European settlement, tōtara wood was prized as a rot-resistant, strong and durable material, used to construct wharf piles, railway sleepers and fence posts.

Bark from tōtara is used to cover and protect traditional pōhā bags, and smoke from tōtara wood was used as a traditional remedy for skin ailments. Early European settlers working in the bush would often make infusions of tōtara leaves for upset stomachs.

The red flesh of tōtara berries is edible.

The diterpene totarol was first isolated from the heartwood of Podocarpus totara in 1910, during investigations into what caused the tree's resistance to rotting. While totarol is no longer typically isolated from the tree in commercial production, it is a common ingredient in cosmetics.

== Symbolic meaning ==
Within Māori culture, the tōtara is regarded as a symbol of strength and mana. Upon the death of a prominent figure, the phrase Kua hinga te tōtara i te wao nui a Tāne ("A mighty tōtara has fallen in the forest of Tāne") or similar is often used as a mark of respect. Because of its use as a material for waka, the tōtara is often associated with Tūmatauenga, the god of war, and an alternative name for the tree is Tū-kau-Moana, or Tū who swims in the ocean.

Due to the tree's resistance to rot, tōtara logs would often be long-lasting fixtures of rivers, lakes and harbours. This led to tōtara logs becoming associated with taniwha, such as Te Upoko o Huraki Tai, a taniwha believed to inhabit a tōtara log on Lake Rotoiti, and Rangititi, who lived on a log on the Wairoa River near Dargaville. Rangititi is seen as a poor omen to Ngāti Whātua, who traditionally interpret birds landing on the log as a sign of death.

== Gallery ==
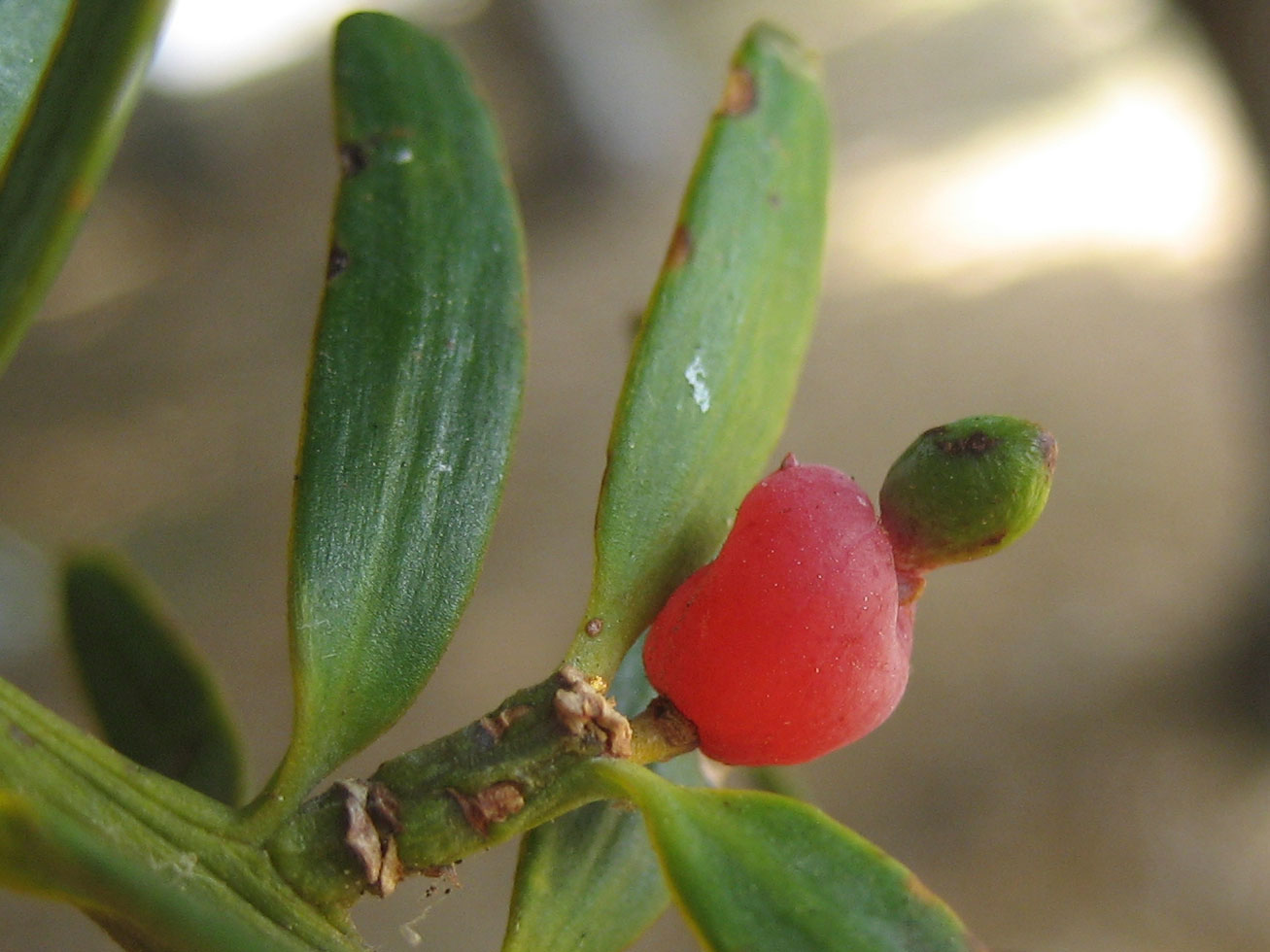
Receptacle and seed of tōtara

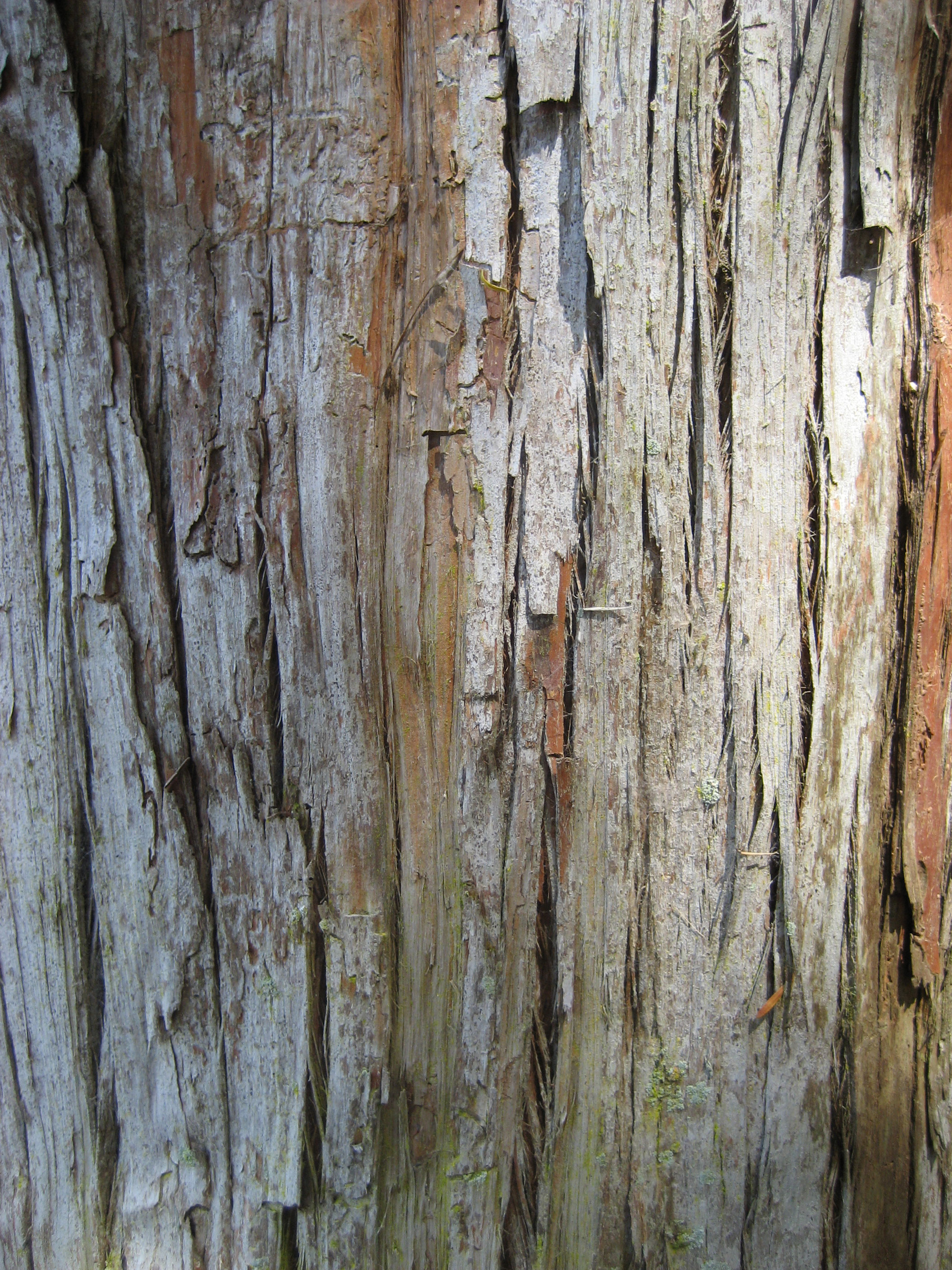
The reddish-grey bark of the tōtara is thick, corky, furrowed and stringy

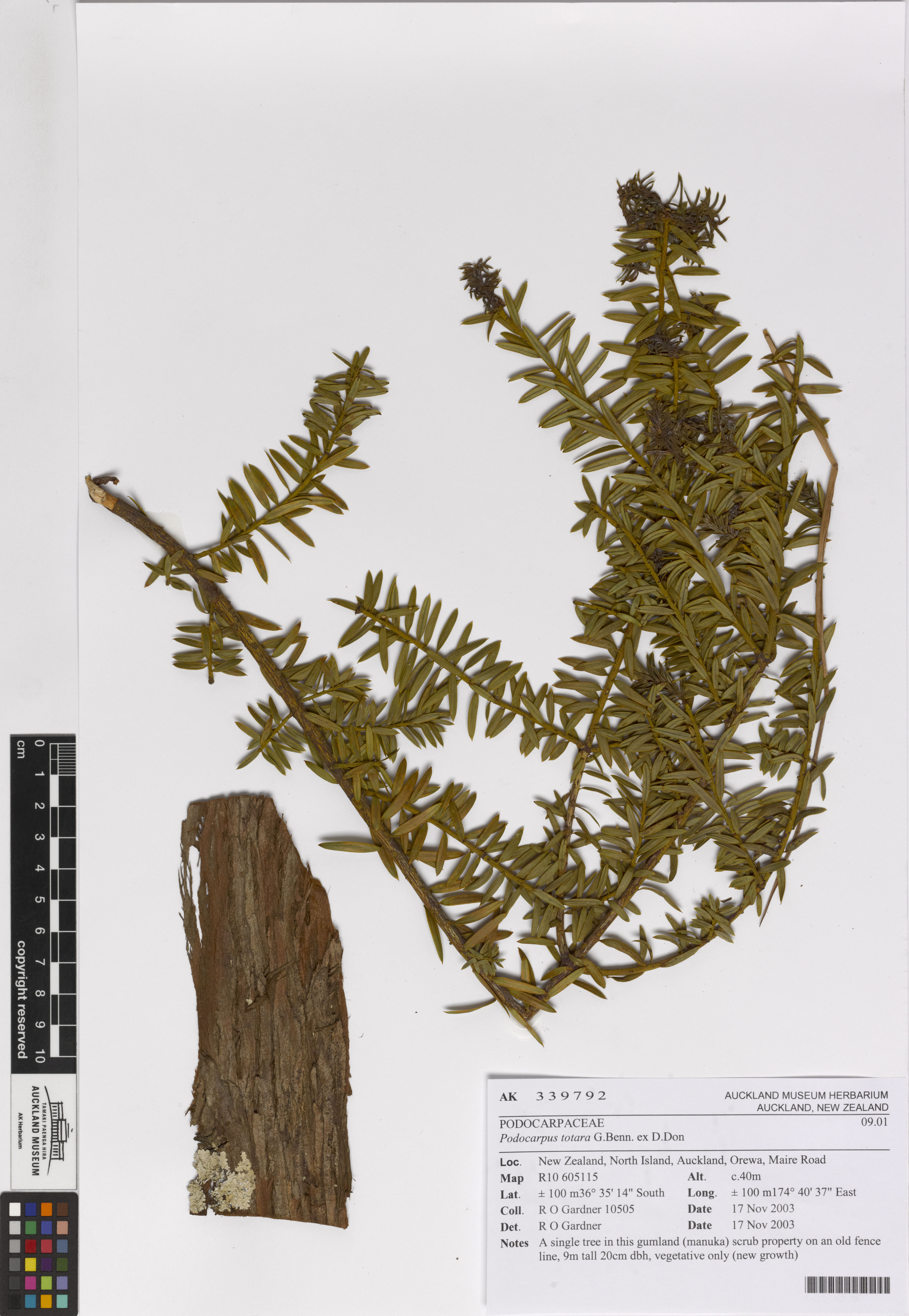
Herbarium specimen

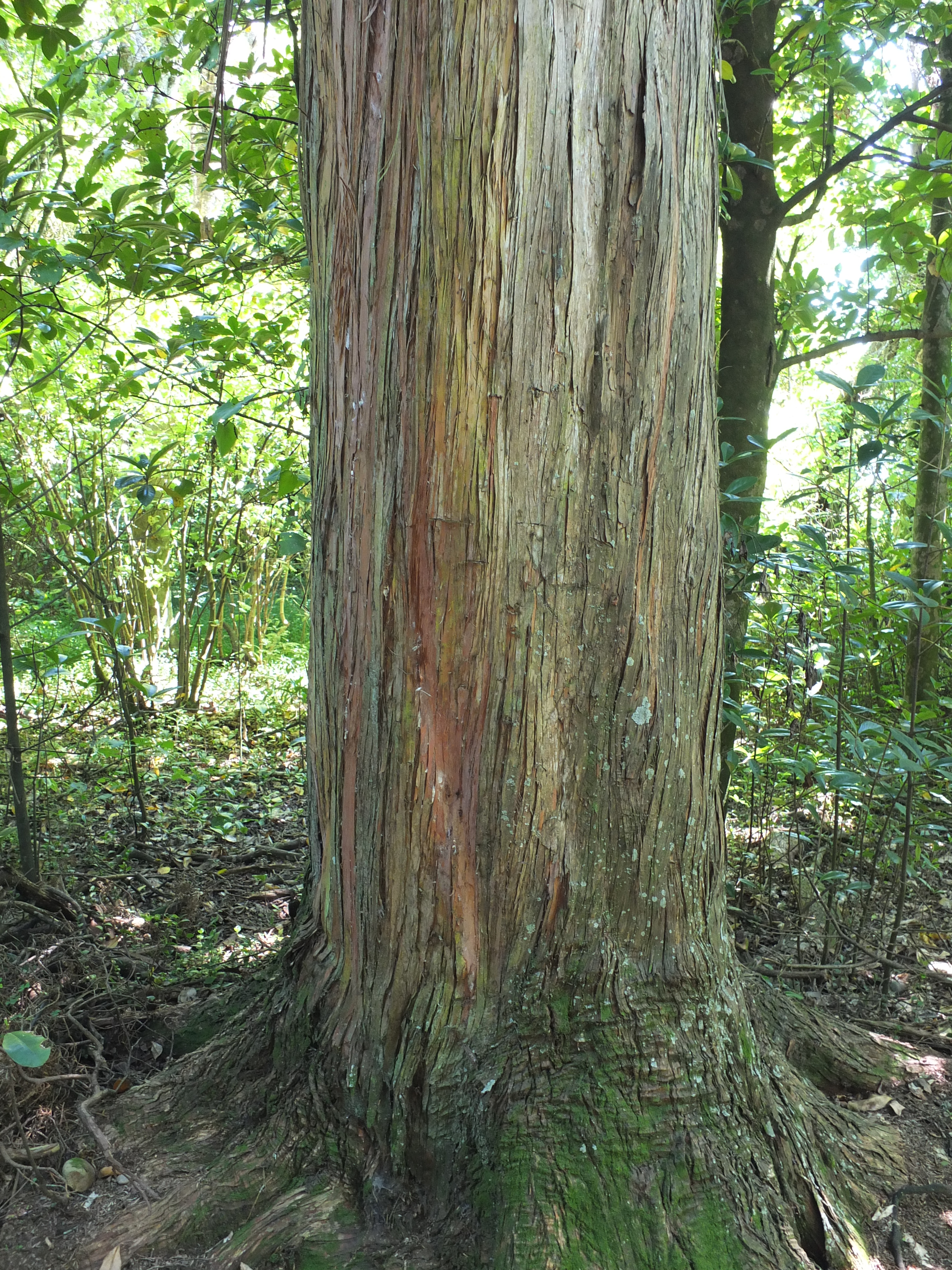
Trunk of a tōtara tree in Prouse Bush, Levin, New Zealand
