= Leigh Brewer =

New Zealand dancer and choreographer

Leigh Brewer ONZM
- Born: 10 October 1933; Wellington
- Died: 26 April 2013
- Education: Wellington Girls' College
- Awards: Officer of the New Zealand Order of Merit

Leigh Carol Brewer ONZM (also known as Leigh Mann; 10 October 1933 - 26 April 2013) was a New Zealand dancer and choreographer. In 2000 she was appointed an Officer of the New Zealand Order of Merit for services to dance.

== Early life and dance career ==
Brewer was born on 10 October 1933 in Wellington.

At the age of six, Brewer danced in Ngaire Keys's Black and Silver Ballet at the St. James Theatre in Wellington in 1939, when the Evening Post called her "an infant prodigy". Brewer performed by invitation for the US Marines at the Majestic Cabaret during the Second World War, and at the age of 15, was awarded a solo seal by the Royal Academy of Dance. She was principal dancer in Waltz Dream for the Wellington Opera Company, and guest soloist with the Wellington Ballet Society with Poul Gnatt for Valse Triste, Les Sylphides and Casse Noisette. Brewer partnered with Jon Trimmer for a New Zealand Opera Company production of The Marriage of Figaro. Brewer was educated at Wellington Girls' College between 1947 and 1949.

== Choreography and teaching career ==
Brewer's performance career ended when her father contracted her as partner and teacher to the Dorothy Daniels School of Dance. She was seventeen, and described the change from performing to teaching, producing and directing as devastating.

Brewer established Wellington City Ballet in 1960. Brewer choreographed what has been described New Zealand's "first indigenous two-act ballet" Children of the Mist, and produced it with James Carney. New Zealand Ballet toured it in 1969.

The Royal New Zealand Ballet under Poul Gnatt danced two of Brewer's works in the 1960s. As a choreographer Brewer worked with the Wellington Operatic Society and Opera Technique in Wellington, as well as Downstage Theatre, Māori Theatre Trust, and the New Zealand Ballet. In 1979 she was awarded a QEII Trust Established Teacher's Award, which she used to travel to New York to study aerobic dance with Lee Theodore at American Dance Machine. Brewer collaborated with theatre director Richard Campion to exhibit Green Are the Islands with Expo 70 in Osaka, Japan. She was later invited to contribute to the Hyogo autumn festival in Kobe in 1972, for which she choreographed a ballet on the subject of pollution.

Brewer made bronze sculptures of dancers, which she exhibited at the New Zealand Academy of Fine Arts. In 1998 she opened Galerie de Brewer to sell her work.

Brewer was married to businessman Trevor Mann, and they had two children together. Brewer died on 26 April 2013.

== Honours and awards ==
In the 2000 Queen's Birthday Honours she was appointed an Officer of the New Zealand Order of Merit for services to dance.
