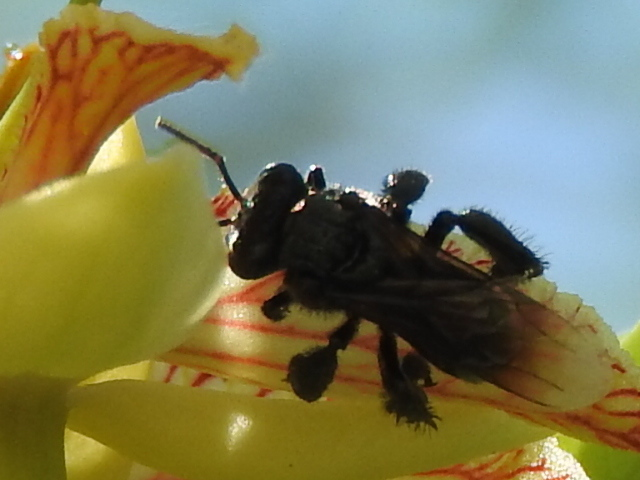

Scientific classification
- Kingdom: Animalia
- Phylum: Arthropoda
- Class: Insecta
- Order: Hymenoptera
- Family: Apidae
- Genus: Frieseomelitta
- Species: F. nigra

Binomial name
- Frieseomelitta nigra Cresson, 1879

= Frieseomelitta nigra =

Species of bee

Frieseomelitta nigra, the black slender-stingless bee or buzzard stingless bee, is a species of stingless bee of the Meliponini tribe endemic to Mexico, Belize and possibly Guatemala.

== Description, distribution and habitat ==
Like other bees in the Meliponini tribe, as well as its relatives in the Frieseomelitta genus, the buzzard bee lacks a stinger. It is around 6 mm long, has an entirely black body, and has dark wings with white tips. It shares many characteristics with Frieseomelitta paupera, the latter even being considered a subspecies of Frieseomelitta nigra in countries such as Colombia and Trinidad and Tobago.

Its distribution extends throughout the Mexican states of Sinaloa, Nayarit, Jalisco, Colima, Michoacán, State of Mexico, Morelos, Guerrero, Oaxaca, Veracruz, Chiapas, Tabasco, Campeche, Yucatán and Quintana Roo, as well as Belize and possibly Guatemala, according to observations. It usually prefers warmer climates in ecosystems such as humid forest, dry forest, scrubland, temperate forest, cloud forest and wetlands. It usually builds nests in holes in trees or lampposts, walls and different types of substrate on the ground, which it usually covers with resin.

Agriculturally important species targeted by the stingless vulture bee include nanche, lemon, coconut, and melon; among other species often pollinated by vulture bees are milk mulberry, Asteraceae, jujubes, and logwood.

The buzzard bee is often used in meliponiculture. F. nigra honey typically has concentrations of between 577 and 607 mg of soluble protein per 100 g; between 162 and 168 mg of gallic acid per 100 g; it has a chelation capacity of 85% for copper ions, 47% for iron ions, and 94% for copper EDTA; the honey has a high scavenging capacity for OH radicals implicated in oxidative stress and related to heart and lung disease, cancer, Alzheimer's disease, and neurodegenerative diseases in humans.
