= Will Scotland =

New Zealand aviator

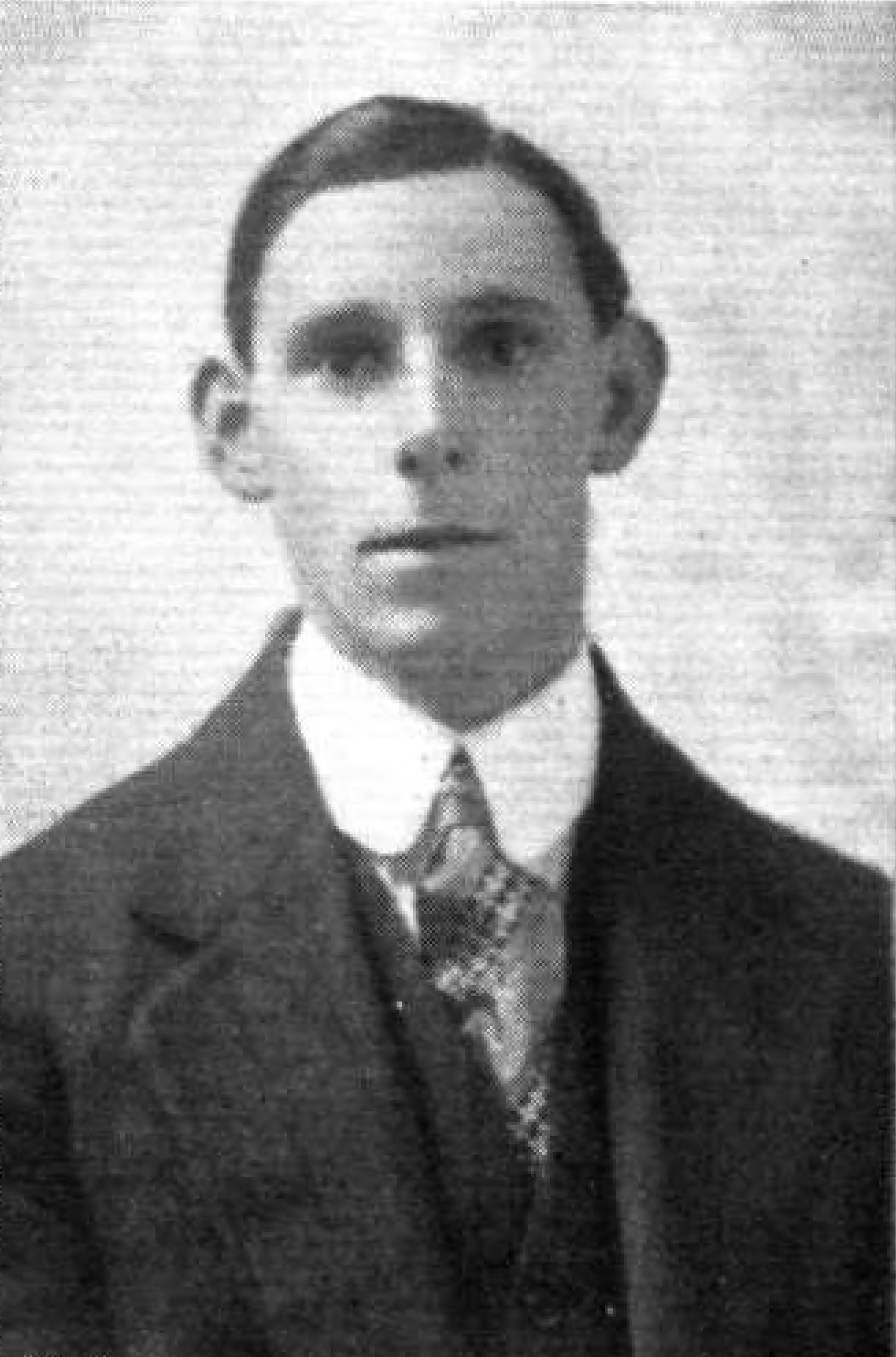
- Scotland in 1913
- Born: James William Humphrys Scotland; 21 September 1891; Pahi, New Zealand
- Died: 19 November 1963 (aged 72); Melbourne, Australia
- Occupation: Aviator
- Known for: First cross-country flight in New Zealand
- Relatives: Henry Scotland (father)
- Aviation career
- Air force: Royal Flying Corps
- Battles: World War I
- Rank: Lieutenant

James William Humphrys Scotland (21 September 1891 – 19 November 1963), usually referred to as Will Scotland, was a pioneering New Zealand aviator. He was the second New Zealander (after Joseph Joel Hammond) to obtain a pilot's certificate.

== Early life ==
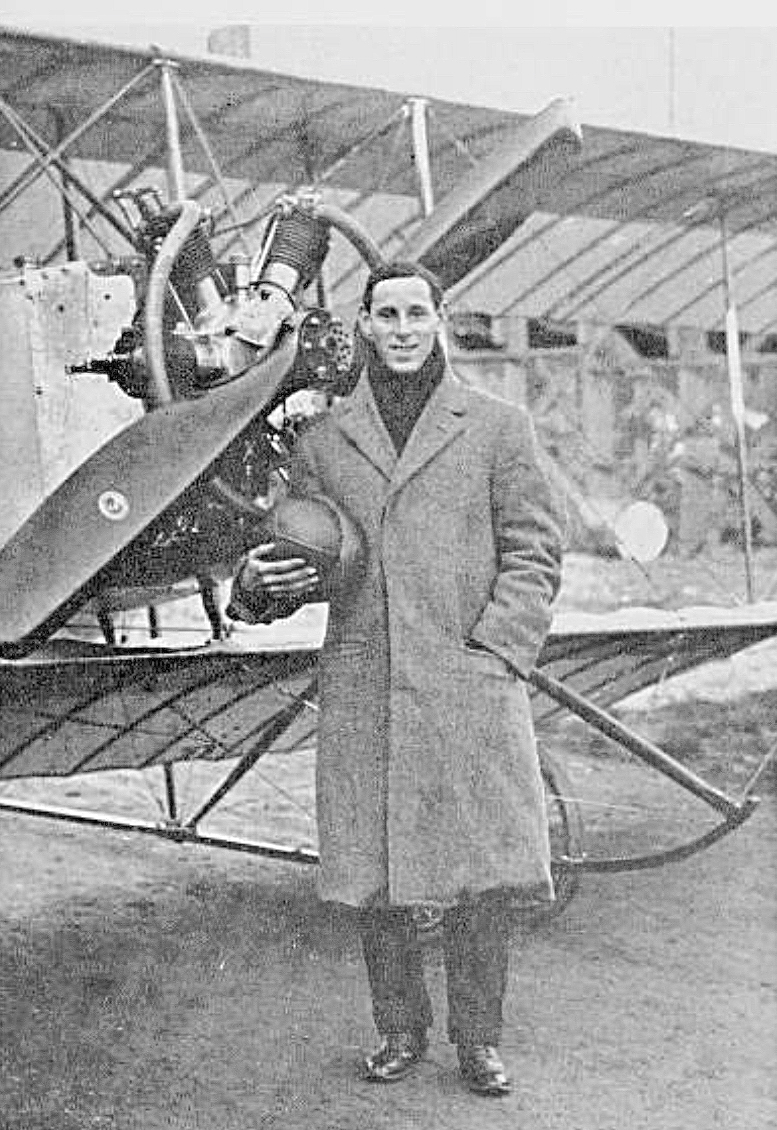
Scotland with his Caudron biplane, 1913

Scotland was born on 21 September 1891 at Pahi in Northland, the younger son of Henry and Mary Ann Scotland (née Spriggs). His father was a member of the New Zealand Legislative Council. He was educated at St John's Collegiate School in Auckland (which subsequently amalgamated with King's College).

== Aviation career ==
In 1913, Scotland travelled to England, where he became a pupil of a flying school established by J. Laurence Hall in Hendon. He was awarded a British Aviation Certificate in October of that year, and purchased his own Caudron biplane for £400. He arranged for the biplane to be shipped to New Zealand, where he returned in January 1914. On his return he joined New Zealand Aviation Ltd, a company that arranged for him to give aerial exhibitions around New Zealand. His biplane was dubbed Blue Bird.

On 20 February 1914, Scotland flew the Blue Bird from Invercargill to Gore, the first cross-country flight in New Zealand. His national tour came to an unfortunate end in Wellington on 25 March, when he crash-landed in a tree by Newtown Park. Although Scotland sustained only minor injuries, the Blue Bird was wrecked. Scotland ordered a replacement Caudron shipped from England; however, he found the newer model more difficult to pilot, and it also crashed during a test flight in Christchurch, although once again Scotland escaped serious injury.

Following the outbreak of the First World War, Scotland enlisted in the Royal Flying Corps in 1915 and was deployed as a lieutenant to the Persian frontier. He received a medical discharge in 1916 and was returned to New Zealand. During his convalescence he assisted Henry Wigram with the establishment of the Canterbury Aviation Company.

== Personal life ==
In November 1917, Scotland married Ivy Stewart in Wellington; it is unclear whether this marriage ended in divorce or Ivy's death. In 1919, he left the aviation industry and joined an insurance company. According to aviation historian E.F. Harvie, Scotland married Mabel Louisa Kennerley during a visit to Sydney in October 1925; the couple settled in Auckland but had no children. In 1936, they emigrated to Melbourne, Australia, where Scotland died on 19 November 1963.
