= Frieseomelitta silvestrii =

Scientific classification
- Domain: Eukaryota
- Kingdom: Animalia
- Phylum: Arthropoda
- Class: Insecta
- Order: Hymenoptera
- Family: Apidae
- Genus: Frieseomelitta
- Species: F. silvestrii

Binomial name
- Frieseomelitta silvestrii (Friese, 1902)

Subspecies
- See text

Species of bee

Frieseomelitta silvestrii is a stingless bee species in the genus Frieseomelitta found in Brazil.

Frieseomelitta silvestrii languida is a subspecies making use of resin and of the chemical compound totarol.
