= Helen Deem =

New Zealand medical doctor (1900 – 1955

Muriel Helen Deem OBE (née Easterfield, 26 February 1900 – 26 October 1955) was a New Zealand medical doctor, medical officer, Plunket medical adviser and university lecturer.

== Early life ==
The daughter of Thomas Easterfield and Anna Maria Kunigunda Büchel, she was born in Wellington, New Zealand, on 26 February 1900. Her father was a founding professor of chemistry at Victoria University of Wellington and director of the Cawthron Institute in Nelson from 1919 to 1930. She attended Wellington Girls' College and Otago University where she graduated in 1925. Her sister was Dr Theodora Hall.

== Career ==
After graduating Deem became a house surgeon at Wanganui Hospital and honorary physician to the Stewart Karitane Hospital. Becoming interested in infant health she undertook the Plunket nurse training at the Karitane hospital in Dunedin and was first recipient of the Plunket Society's Lady King Scholarship in 1928. She used the scholarship to study infant feeding and nutrition and breastfeeding, writing up her research as an MD thesis in 1928.

After the death of her husband and a short period working at Wellington Hospital Deem went to England in 1934 to study paediatrics, gaining the Diploma of the Royal College of Obstetricians and Gynaecologist in 1935. Returning to New Zealand in 1936 she joined the Health Department as a school medical officer in the South Auckland District and assistant to Dr Harold Turbott. She worked in the Taupo-Tokaanu district addressing nutritional and public health issues for pre-school and school age children, and instituted a dried milk scheme for Māori schools and a diphtheria immunisation programme in the Waikato.

In 1939 she became a medical advisor to the Plunket Society, guiding the Society through changes in thinking and knowledge about infant feeding. She advocated a common sense approach in contrast to Plunket's strict prescriptive feeding regime. Her revision of Plunket's infant feeding formulae was adopted by the New Zealand Paediatric Society in 1951 as a guide for infant feeding throughout the country.

With the Plunket Nursing Advisor, Nora Fitzgibbon, Deem carried out the first height and weight survey of nearly 9000 New Zealand infants. This formed the basis of the widely used height and weight tables for babies. Deem and Fitzgibbon published a mothercraft handbook for Plunket, which was reprinted several times. She also carried out three national surveys of breast feeding in 1939, 1945 and 1952 finding that the extent and duration of breast feeding declined over the years. She was a staunch advocate of breast feeding but not of rigid routine feeding by the clock.

In 1941 Deem opened a pre-school centre in the grounds of the Truby King-Harris Karitane Hospital in Dunedin in response to the gap in health and welfare services for pre-school children. It was renamed as the Helen Deem Kindergarten.

Deem advocated for the appointment of paediatricians to Plunket services however she did not pursue her plans to incorporate paediatricians into Plunket clinics. She also sought to improve training in child health for medical students. In 1946 she took up the position of lecturer in preventive paediatrics at the medical school at Otago University in Dunedin.

Deem was awarded a Carnegie Corporation of New York grant in 1947 to study international developments in paediatrics. She visited the United States, Britain and Scandinavia and represented New Zealand at an International Paediatric Conference in New York.

== Personal life ==
Deem married civil engineer John Stanley Longton Deem in 1929 and they had one daughter. He died suddenly in 1933.

She died of leukaemia in Dunedin on 26 October 1955.

== Honours and awards ==
In the 1952 New Year Honours, Deem was appointed an Officer of the Order of the British Empire, for services as medical advisor to the Plunket Society. In 1953, she was awarded the Queen Elizabeth II Coronation Medal.

== Publications ==
- Deem, H. (n.d.). Observations on the milk of N.Z. women. Dunedin: Otago University.
- Deem, H., FitzGibbon, N. (1945) Modern mothercraft: A guide to parents. Dunedin [N.Z.: Royal New Zealand Society for the Health of Women and Children.
- Deem, H. (1950?) Karitane hospitals: Admissible and non-admissible cases and the procedure governing admission. [Wellington?] : Royal New Zealand Society for the Health of Women and Children.
- Deem, H. (1950) Are we always fair to milk?. Dunedin: Royal New Zealand Society for the Health of Women and Children.
