= Totarol =

Names
- IUPAC name 14-(Propan-2-yl)podocarpa-8,11,13-trien-13-ol
- Systematic IUPAC name (4bS,8aS)-4b,8,8-Trimethyl-1-(propan-2-yl)-4b,5,6,7,8,8a,9,10-octahydrophenanthren-2-ol
- Other names (4bS)-trans-8,8-Trimethyl-4b,5,6,7,8,8a,9,10-octahydro-1-isopropylphenanthren-2-ol

Identifiers
CAS Number	511-15-9
3D model (JSmol)	Interactive image
ChEBI	CHEBI:69241
ChEMBL	ChEMBL487602
ChemSpider	83757
ECHA InfoCard	100.151.658
EC Number	622-932-2
PubChem CID	92783
UNII	67NH2854WW
CompTox Dashboard (EPA)	DTXSID9047752
- InChI: InChI=1S/C20H30O/c1-13(2)18-14-7-10-17-19(3,4)11-6-12-20(17,5)15(14)8-9-16(18)21/h8-9,13,17,21H,6-7,10-12H2,1-5H3/t17-, InChI=1/C20H30O/c1-13(2)18-14-7-10-17-19(3,4)11-6-12-20(17,5)15(14)8-9-16(18)21/h8-9,13,17,21H,6-7,10-12H2,1-5H3/t17-,20+/m0/s1 Key: ZRVDANDJSTYELM-FXAWDEMLBD
- SMILES: CC(C)C1=C(C=CC2=C1CC[C@@H]3[C@@]2(CCCC3(C)C)C)O

Properties
Chemical formula	C_{20}H_{30}O
Molar mass	286.459 g·mol^{−1}
Melting point	128 to 132 °C (262 to 270 °F; 401 to 405 K)

Hazards
- GHS labelling
Pictograms	(GHS07: Exclamation mark)
Signal word	Warning
Hazard statements	H315, H319, H335
Precautionary statements	P261, P264, P271, P280, P302+P352, P304+P340, P305+P351+P338, P312, P321, P332+P313, P337+P313, P362, P403+P233, P405, P501
- Except where otherwise noted, data are given for materials in their standard state (at 25 °C [77 °F], 100 kPa). verify (what is ?) Infobox references

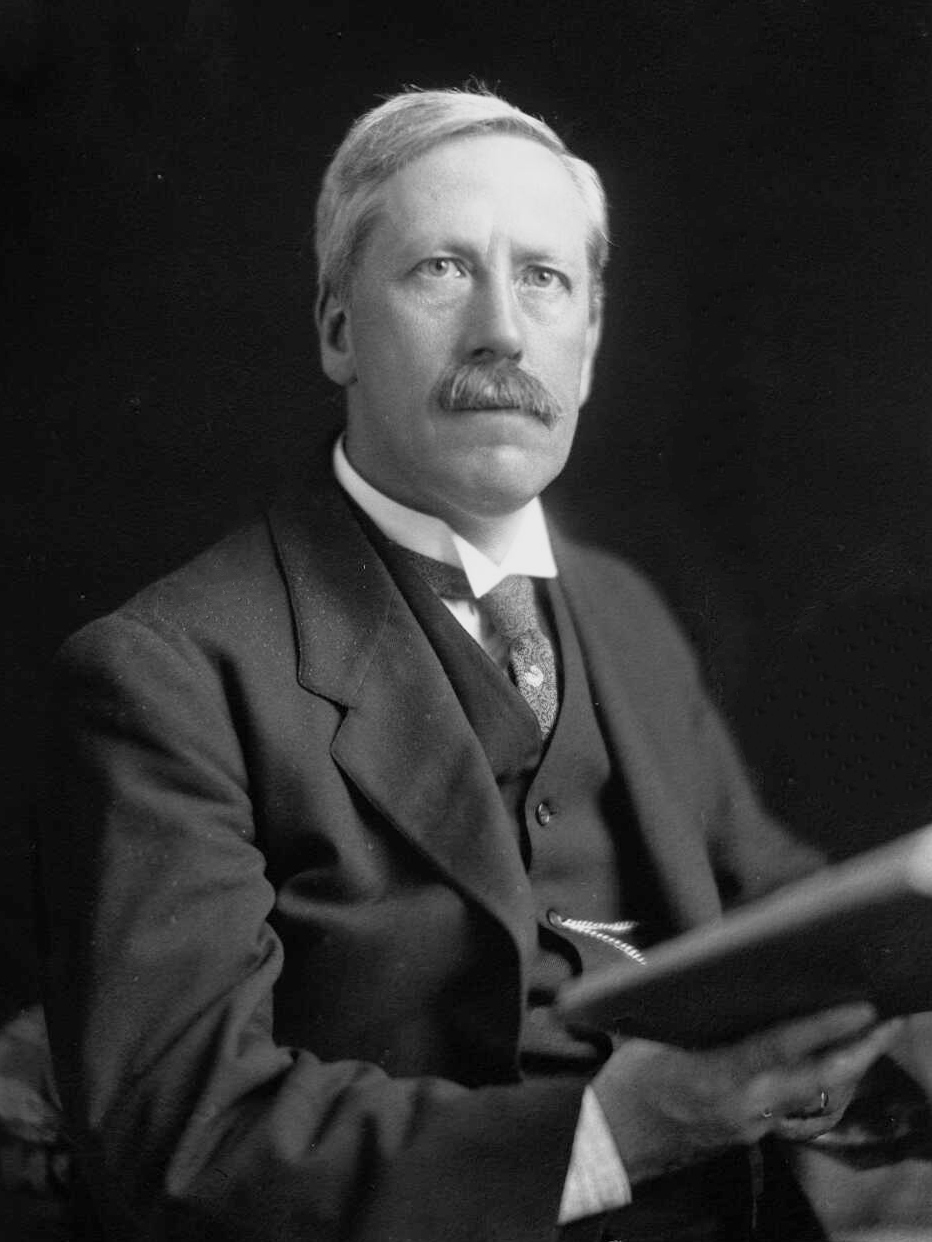
New Zealand scientist Sir Thomas Hill Easterfield was the first person to discover totarol. Photo 1920.

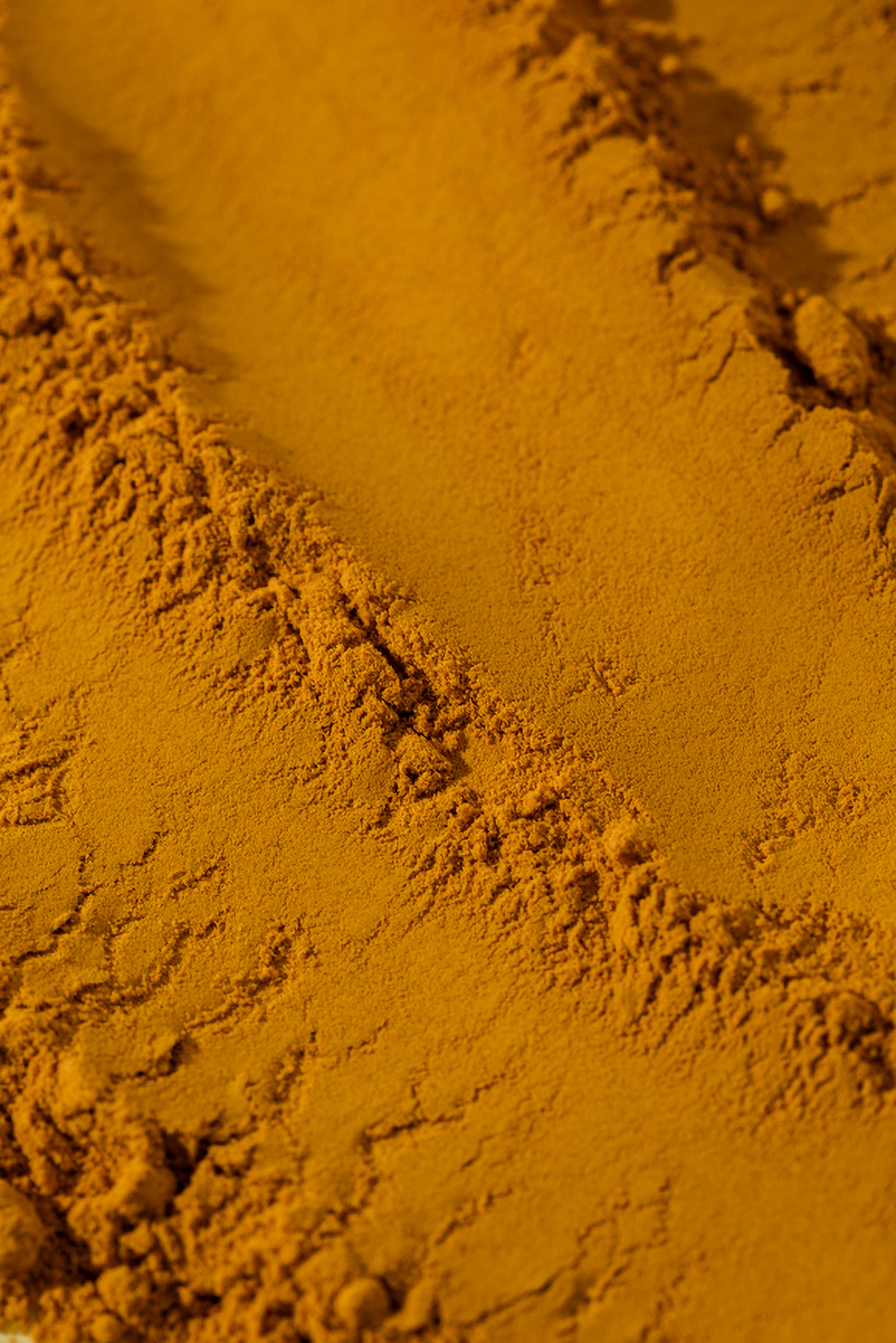
Totarol powder

Totarol is a naturally produced diterpene that is bioactive. It was first isolated by McDowell and Easterfield from the heartwood of Podocarpus totara, an endemic conifer species found in New Zealand. Podocarpus totara was investigated for unique molecules due to the tree's increased resistance to rotting. Recent studies have confirmed totarol's unique antimicrobial and therapeutic properties. Consequently, totarol is a candidate for a new source of drugs and has been the goal of numerous syntheses.

== Discovery ==
Totarol was discovered in 1910 by New Zealand scientist Sir Thomas Hill Easterfield. While investigating the properties of Miro, Kahikatea, Rimu, Matai and Totara, Easterfield detected a "crystalline bloom" on totara boards a few hours after leaving the planing machine. After extraction of totarol from Podocarpus totara, Easterfield observed no other compound had been cited in chemical literature before with this formula. Easterfield and his colleague J.C McDowell proposed the name "totarol" in a follow-up paper in 1915, as the crystalline substance was believed to possess a tertiary alcohol group. In 1937 Short and Stromberg continued investigations, publishing Totarol Part 1. In 1951 Short and Wang became the first to identify the chemical structure of totarol with their paper Totarol Part 2.

== Occurrence ==
Although totarol was first isolated in Podocarpus totara, totarol has also been identified in numerous other species of Podocarpaceae and Cupressaceae, with the majority found in the genus Podocarpus of the family Podocarpaceae and the subfamily Cupressoideae of the family Cupressaceae. Outside Podocarpus and Cupressoideae, totarol is rarely found in the plant kingdom. However, totarol has recently been isolated in Rosmarinus officinalis (rosemary). The gymnosperms that contain totarol are distributed worldwide but are concentrated in North America, the far-south regions of South America, East Asia and East Africa.

== Biological activity ==
=== Antimicrobial activity ===
Totarol motivates research in drug discovery due to its ability to inhibit numerous microorganisms. Totarol exhibits antimicrobial properties in numerous species including gram-positive bacteria, acid-fast bacteria, nematodes, parasitic protozoans, crustaceous foulers (Table 1). In addition to inhibiting microorganisms by itself, totarol exhibits inhibitory synergy with currently used antimicrobial drugs: totarol potentiates isonicotinic acid hydrazide against various Mycobacteria.; methicillin against Mycobacterium tuberculosis and Staphylococcus aureus; and anacardic acid and erythromycin against Staphylococcus aureus. In nature, totarol is a key player in gymnosperm's defense against harmful microbes: gymnosperms that produce totarol are resistant to rotting.

Table 1. Antibacterial activity of totarol against microorganisms

Microorganism	MIC (μg/ml)	IC50(μg/ml)
Artemia salina	-	1
Bacterium ammoniagenes	0.78	-
Bacillus subtilis	1.56	-
Caenorhabditis elegans	-	80
Enterococcus faecalis	2	-
Klebsiella pneumoniae	>32	-
Mycobacterium aurum	2	7.5
Mycobacterium fortuitum	4	7.5
Mycobacterium phlei	4	7.5
Mycobacterium smegmatis	2	7.5
Mycobacterium tuberculosis H37Rv	21.1	7.5
Leishmania donovani	-	3.5
Proprionibacterium acnes	3.9	-
Staphylococcus aureus ATCC 12598	1.56	-
Staphylococcus aureus ATCC 33591	0.78	-
Staphylococcus aureus ATCC 11632	0.78	-
Streptococcus mutans	0.78	-
Streptococcus pneumoniae	2	-

=== Mechanism of antimicrobial inhibition ===
Although totarol exhibits antimicrobial properties, the mode of action is unclear and various methods of inhibitory action have been proposed. In Staphylococcus aureus strains resistant to penicillin via creation of penicillin binding protein 2' (PBP2'), totarol may inhibit the synthesis of PBP2'. Totarol may inhibit effluxing Staphylococcus aureus strains through inhibition of MsrA, although it is unclear if MsrA is an efflux pump. Totarol may also gain its antibacterial properties by inhibiting bacterial respiratory transport but this is very unlikely because totarol is also effective against anaerobic organisms. Recently totarol was also hypothesized to inhibit gram-positive and acid-fast bacteria via inhibition of FtsZ protein, which forms the Z-ring, a polymer necessary for efficient bacterial cell cytokinesis.

Totarol may also function by disrupting the structural integrity of the phospholipid bilayer of bacteria by weakening Van der Waals interactions with its phenolic group, which also results in bacterial cells unable to synthesize ATP. Motivation for totarol functioning via disruption of membrane structure is due to its high phospholipid/water partition coefficient. However, totarol's partitioning capability was only observed at concentrations 10 to 100 fold higher than required for antibacterial activity. Thus it is unlikely that totarol is an uncoupler of bacterial respiration at the low levels observed in antimicrobial studies.

=== Traditional use ===
The use of Podocarpus totara extract in Māori medicines for treatment of fevers, asthma, coughs, cholera, distemper, chest complaints and venereal disease dates back to over 100 years. The timber of Podocarpus totara is renowned for its resilience against rotting, which made it valuable to Māori for housing, waka (canoes), fencing, pā stockades, drinking vessels, shovels and carvings in chiefs houses. Tōtara bark was used to cover kelp bags containing preserved muttonbirds known as pōhā. The tōtara tree was accorded divine status by Māori based on its immense size and its use in making waka employed on long, dangerous voyages. Carved tōtara can be viewed as a representation of ancestry and historical and mythological events. The tōtara can also be seen to represent a connection between the past and the present, the secular and the spiritual. It has a strong link to Māori creation stories as it reaches down to Papatūānuku (Mother Earth) and up towards Ranginui (Sky Father). The roots in the symbolism of the tōtara mark out a genealogical reference point which Māori believe ties them to the natural world, the whenua (land) and their ancestral rohe (territory). In Māori tradition tōtara is the first born child of Tāne-Mahuta and the forest goddess Mumuwhango and is considered a noble tree. According to tradition, felling a tōtara wasn't possible without seeking permission from Tāne-Mahuta. This involved performing specific rituals and chanting karakia (invocation). European settlers of New Zealand used the wood for wharf piles, bridges, railway sleepers, telegraph poles, lighthouses, mining equipment, fence posts and foundation blocks. The durability stems from the anti-bacterial activity of totarol. Houses, churches, grave markers, and even cobbles and kerbs were made of tōtara; strips of the bark were used as a roofing material. The presence of totarol means tōtara wood resists decay and insect attack in the heart timber.

Totarol has been found in organic matter in the embankments of a Neolithic site in Northern Sweden. Scientists have suggested that totarol from Cupressaceae resin at the site was used for its antibacterial and antifungal properties to preserve meat, as well as for its ability to repel insects. Totarol has been observed in the endemic Mexican plant Buddleja perfoliata, used in traditional medicine as a topical antiseptic and diuretic against headaches, colds, tuberculosis, heart disease, dizziness and nervousness. Totarol has also been identified in the leaves of Algerian grown ethnomedicinal shrub Myrtus Communis. Leaf extract from the flowering plant has been used historically as a medicine known as "El Rayhan". It was used as a decoction, infusion and health remedy for bathing newborns with inflamed skin and washing sores. Additionally, it was used to treat oral wounds, disorders of the digestive and urinary systems, diarrhea, peptic ulcers, hemorrhoids and inflammations. Totarol was detected in a 2024 Myrtus Communis leaf extract study and described as having considerable anti-inflammatory potential. Totarol from juniper or cypress trees was used in ancient Egyptian mummification. In 2023 totarol was found in an embalming workshop dated to around 664-525BC a few meters south of the pyramid of King Unas at Saqqara. Despite totarol's demonstrated antimicrobial efficacy, its commercial application remains primarily confined to the cosmetic industry. For totarol to be considered for clinical use, a comprehensive understanding of its mode of action is essential.

=== Biochemical properties ===
Totarol decreases the plasma levels of estrogens and can also effectively reduce pathogenic hepatic cells in vitro. Totarol's anti-cancer activity is hypothesized to be due to the natural product's ability to form an o-quinone methide in vivo. Totarol also prevents cells from undergoing oxidative stress in vitro by acting as a hydrogen donor to peroxy radicals or reacting with other peroxy radicals to terminate undesirable radical reactions.

== Biosynthesis ==
Totarol is a precursor to the formation of nagilactones that possess antifungal properties not possessed by totarol. Consequently, gymnosperms that produce totarol and nagilactones are able to defend themselves against bacteria and fungi.

Scheme 1. The initially proposed biosynthetic route of totarol.

The biosynthesis of totarol was difficult to determine. The main reason for the challenge in determining how the secondary metabolite is produced is because totarol does not follow the isoprene rule: the isopropyl group of totarol is in the "wrong" place at C14. Initially, it was hypothesized that totarol and the "normal" diterpene ferruginol, also found in Podocarpaceae, were derived by a precursor 2 that would be dehydrated and have its isopropyl group migrate to produce totarol 1 and ferruginol 3 (Scheme 1). This hypothesis was motivated by the well known santonin-desmotroposantonin rearrangement of steroid dienones into aromatic compounds. It is now accepted that totarol is synthesized biologically from ferruginol. Geranyl geranyl pyrophosphate 4 undergoes typical diterpene cyclization to form (−)-abietadiene 5, which is oxidized to form ferruginol 3, which proceeds through a spiro intermediate to form totarol (Scheme 2).

Scheme 2. The currently accepted biosynthetic route of totarol

== Synthesis ==
Scheme 3. The first total synthesis of (±)-totarol

Totarol has been the subject of numerous syntheses. The first total synthesis of totarol (Scheme 3) utilized 6 and the alkyne 7 to yield 8 which was converted to the corresponding ketone 9 via hydrogenation followed by cyclization with polyphosphoric acid. 9 was subsequently converted to 10 and another ketone that were inseparable by chromatography. The synthesis was finalized by treatment with N-Bromosuccinimide followed by debromination to yield (±)-totarol. The main downfall of this synthesis was that in multiple steps, complete conversion of reactant to products was not observed and undesirable side products were often not separable by chromatography. However, since this was the first total synthesis of (±)-totarol, it is notable.

=== Total enantioselective synthesis ===
Scheme 4. The first total enantioselective synthesis of totarol

The first total enantioselective synthesis of totarol was achieved in 1979 (Scheme 4). The key step in the synthesis is the formation of 13 via a Wittig reaction between 11 and 12. This same cyclization can also be achieved via a Friedel-Crafts alkylation and cyclization. Subsequent hydrogenation of 13 followed by intramolecular cyclization with aluminium chloride forms the B ring and totarylmethyl ether which is demethylated by boron tribromide to yield totarol.

Scheme 5. The total synthesis of (+) totarol from zamoranic acid.

A more recent organic synthesis of totarol was achieved by utilizing 14, a lamdane diterpene named zamoranic acid (Scheme 5). The addition of the isopropyl group in the chemical synthesis was achieved with complete stereoselectivity. Acetylation to yield 15 required high temperatures due to the steric hindrance of the isopropyl group. Cis-hydroxylation followed by cleavage with H_{5}IO_{6} yielded a diol that was acylated in pyridine and oxidized to give 16. The key step in the synthesis was the cyclization of ring C: 16 was treated with SmI_{2} to yield totarane diastereomers which were separated by column chromatography. The desired diastereomer was treated with p-TsOH in benzene to yield 17. The synthesis was completed by a halogenation-dehydrogenation sequence and subsequent bromination to yield 18 and ring aromatization with elimination via a lithium complex.

=== Total chemoenzymatic synthesis ===
Scheme 6. The chemoenzymatic synthesis of totarol.

Chemoenzymatic synthesis of totarol has also been achieved with high yield (41.8%) (Scheme 6). A racemic beta-keto ester 19 undergoes lipase-assisted resolution to yield chiral alcohol 20. Treatment of 20 with 10% HCl and p-TsOH gives αβ-unsaturated ketone 21. A Michael addition with the anion obtained from the reaction of methyl 5-methyl-3-oxohexanoate 13 with NaOMe gives a 2:1 diastereomeric mixture of 22 which is hydrolyzed to yield 23 which is brominated and debrominated to yield totarol.

== Research ==
Year	Subject
1966	New Zealand Phytochemical register
1966	Reductions of totarol
1992	Bacteria killer and antibiotic enhancer
1996	Anti methicillin-resistant Staphylococcus aureus
1997	Antioxidant
1998	Diterpene
1999	Antibacterial
1999	Anti methicillin-resistant Staphylococcus aureus
2000	Mosquito insecticide
2001	Tuberculosis
2001	Cell change
2002	Insect repellant
2003	Antiplasmodial and cytotoxic
2004	Antimalarial
2005	Anti-inflammatory
2006	Anti acne
2007	Antifungal
2007	Staphylococcus auereus inhibition
2007	Tuberculosis
2015	Neurological disorders
2015	Bacillus subtilis alteration
2017	Ultrasound treatment on whey protein-totarol nanoparticles
2017	Surgical site infection
2018	Plant defense
2018	Food preservative
2019	Historical food preservative
2019	Antibacterial for dental implants
2020	Whey protein based tissue adhesive
2020	Mastitis
2020	Application of totarol as natural antibacterial coating on dental implants for prevention of peri-implantitis
2021	Anticancer
2021	Treatment of superficial pyoderma in dogs with totarol
2022	Drug delivery destroys microbial biofilm
2022	Anti-inflammatory
2023	Insecticide
2023	Influenza A
2023	Antifungal
2024	Anti-inflammatory
2024	3D printed PEEK implants with natural totarol coating
2024	Staphylococcus pseudintermedius and Staphylococcus coagulans in dogs and cats
2024	Prostate and breast cancer inhibitor
2024	Antibacterial effects through antibiofilm and combined interaction against vancomycin-resistant Enterococcus faecalis
2024	Evaluation of totarol for promoting open wound healing in dogs

== Extraction ==
Totarol is extracted by supercritical extraction. The process uses high pressure carbon dioxide under specific temperature, pressure and gas flow conditions to extract totarol from powdered tōtara wood. Totarol can be extracted from dead wood, negating the need to cut down live trees. Although totarol can be extracted from other Podocarpus, some trees in the cypress family (cypress, juniper, thuja) and from rosemary, it is most abundant in Podocarpus totara.

== Products ==
Products for sale containing totarol include toothpastes, tooth tablets, mouthwash, toners, cleansers, moisturisers, face masks, concealers, blemish control, anti-acne, pimple patches, face cream, eye cream, sun screen, deodorants, face mists, facial wash, anti-wrinkle, restorative serum, renew cream, scar removal serum, dandruff control, scalp treatment, shampoo bar, pet skin cream, pet shampoo, pet deodorant, pet healing clay, pet skin therapy shampoo/ spray, pet paw wash, healing balm, hand wash, hand cream, pressed powder makeup, mascara, rescue cream, skin whitener, lip tint, pregnancy body oil, mouth freshener, sore throat relief, cold and flu nasal spray.

== Other uses ==
Totarol may also be used as an indicator for the quality of juniper berry based spirits. Juniper berries that contain diterpenoids including totarol are used for the aromatization and production of some gins. Consequently, totarol can aid in the characterization of different types of gin or commercial brands, vouching for the authenticity and quality of the product.

Totarol has been found on the posterior tibia of Frieseomelitta silvestrii languida, a species of stingless bees from Brazil. Frieseomelitta silvestrii languida collect resin to create a protective barrier around the opening of their nest to ward off insects from settling near the nest's entrance. The presence of totarol can aid in the determination of this bee species.
