= Māori Theatre Trust =

The Māori Theatre Trust was a contemporary theatre company of Māori actors formed in the 1960s which performed in New Zealand and overseas.

== Formation ==
The opera Porgy and Bess was produced in New Zealand in 1965 and featured 30 Māori performers in supporting roles and the chorus as well as Māori opera singer Īnia Te Wīata in the lead. From this experience the group of Māori performers formed the Māori Theatre Trust to present contemporary Māori theatre and performance. Members included Don Selwyn, Apirana Taylor and George Henare. The New Zealand Opera Company supported with rehearsal space on High Street.

Selwyn talked of the inspiration Īnia Te Wīata gave the group from his level of skill and professionalism, the impact of theatre of audiences and Te Wīata's vision to present 'the stories that we had to tell'.

== Performances ==
The Trust initially performed plays with Māori cast members and Māori themes, but the scripts were from Pākehā (white non-Māori) playwrights.

The Trust had intended to perform Bruce Mason's new play Awatea in 1967 as Mason had offered them the rights for two years. It was to tour, be directed by Dick Johnstone, and premiere in Gisborne, but the new arts funding body, the Queen Elizabeth Arts Council, declined to provide funding so they did not carry out their plans.

In 1967 the Trust performed He Mana Toa (The Creation) by Professor James Ritchie at Unity Theatre in Wellington. It was directed by Richard Campion and others who worked on it were Leigh Brewer (choreography) and Douglas Lilburn (sound design). Performers included Karen Jurgensen and Don Solomon. It included modern scenes, the Māori creation story and historical scenes with the figures Te Rauparaha and Tamihana. This production was staged for the jubilee of Unity Theatre as they moved into their new Aro Street premises, and part of Wellington's first Māori Arts Festival.

The Golden Lover was also staged in 1967 as part of the festival. Cast members included Wi Kuki Kaa, Don Selwyn, Bob Hirini, Shirley Duke, Ray Henwood. Tomoti Te Hue Heu, Harata Solomon, Thelma Grabmeier, Sue Hansen and Ada Rangiaho.

In 1970 the Maori Theatre Trust toured internationally directed and choreographed by Dick Johnstone starting at the Expo 70 in Osaka, Japan, then Hungary and the Soviet Union. For the Expo 70 production the Māori Theatre Trust were part of a group 270 performer's including the New Zealand Ballet and the National Band who were all part of an event called Green Are The Islands with music by Douglas Lilburn. Richard Campion was producer and Leigh Brewer was choreographer.

The Expo was a shift of style for the Trust to do a concert party show rather than the theatre they had done before. Michael Edgeley got involved and Don Selwyn left. Financial pressures forced the trust to disband at the end of the tour without completing the USA dates.

== Legacy ==
The Māori Theatre Trust introduced Māori to theatre as a valid artistic expression, and made it 'part of a Māori artistic consciousness'. Researcher Janinka Greenwood says the 'Māori Theatre Trust brought a lot of Māori actors and dancers into theatre'.
