= Thomas Easterfield =

New Zealand chemist (1866–1949)

Sir Thomas Easterfield KBE
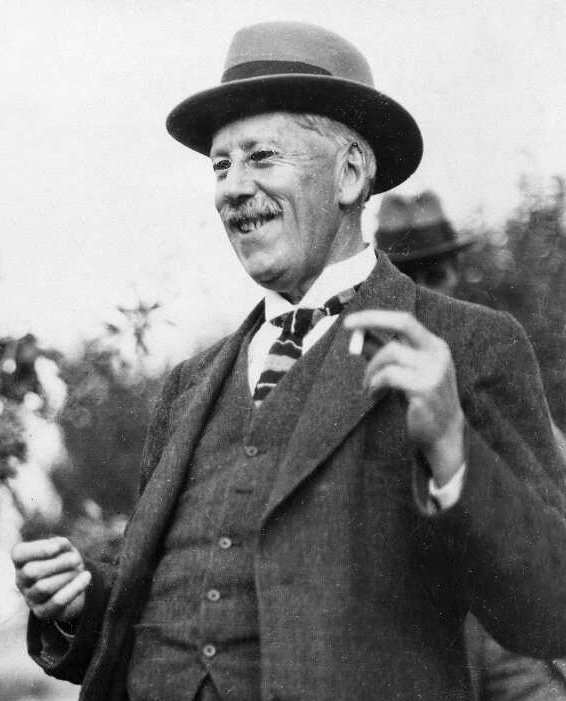
- Easterfield c. 1926
- Born: Thomas Hill Easterfield; 4 March 1866; Doncaster, Yorkshire, England
- Died: 1 March 1949 (aged 82); Nelson, New Zealand
- Resting place: Ashes scattered at Cawthron Institute
- Education: Clare College, Cambridge
- Spouse: Anna Maria Kunigunda Büchel
- Children: 5
- Relatives: Helen Deem (daughter); Theodora Hall (daughter)
- Scientific career
- Workplaces: University Chemical Laboratory, Cambridge; The Perse School; Victoria University College; Cawthron Institute
- Notable students: Sir Theodore Rigg

Sir Thomas Hill Easterfield KBE (4 March 1866 – 1 March 1949) was a New Zealand chemist. Born in Doncaster, England, he was the youngest of four children of Edward Easterfield, savings bank secretary, and Susan (née Hill). He attended Doncaster Grammar School, and later entered the Yorkshire College of Science, now the University of Leeds. He was then appointed a Senior Foundation Scholar of Clare College, Cambridge, from where he gained First Class honours in the Natural Sciences Tripos in 1886.

After graduation Easterfield worked in the Technische Hochschule Zürich, the University of Zürich, and later in the University of Würzburg under Emil Fischer, from where he was awarded a PhD in 1894 for his work on citrazinic acid.

In 1888, Easterfield returned to Cambridge as a junior demonstrator in the chemistry department. He was appointed a lecturer in the University Extension programme in 1891 and in 1894 lecturer on pharmaceutical chemistry and chemistry of sanitary science; he was also a master at The Perse School.

In 1899, Easterfield was appointed one of the four foundation professors of the Victoria University College, Wellington; he and their two daughters set sail for the 90 day voyage on the Kaikoura from Plymouth on 11 February. In 1919 he became the first director of the Cawthron Institute, Nelson; he retired from there in 1933.

Easterfield isolated the chemical compounds Totarol, Cannabinol and Tutin.

In 1935, he was awarded the King George V Silver Jubilee Medal. He was appointed a Knight Commander of the Order of the British Empire in the 1938 King's Birthday Honours.

== Academic society memberships ==
- Foundation member of the New Zealand Institute (later the Royal Society of New Zealand Te Apārangi); President in 1921–22
- Nelson Philosophical Society; several times President
- The Australian and New Zealand Association for the Advancement of Science; President of the Chemistry Section 1909
- Foundation member of the New Zealand Institute of Chemistry
- Life Fellow of the Royal Institute of Chemistry of Great Britain and Ireland

== Family ==
Thomas Easterfield met Anna Maria Kunigunda Büchel while he was working in Würzburg and they married there on 1 September 1894. They had five children, the first two born in England and the others in New Zealand:

- Margaret Anna
- Beatrice Mary
- Muriel Helen
- Theodora Clemens
- Thomas Edward

Sir Thomas Hill Easterfield died in Nelson, New Zealand on 1 March 1949. His ashes were scattered in a garden nook at the Cawthron Institute.

[He] will ever be remembered as an outstanding chemist who created from virtually nothing—much of the equipment was of his own making—the Department of Chemistry at Victoria College, Wellington, successfully fathering such an undertaking through all vicissitudes,

— David Miller
