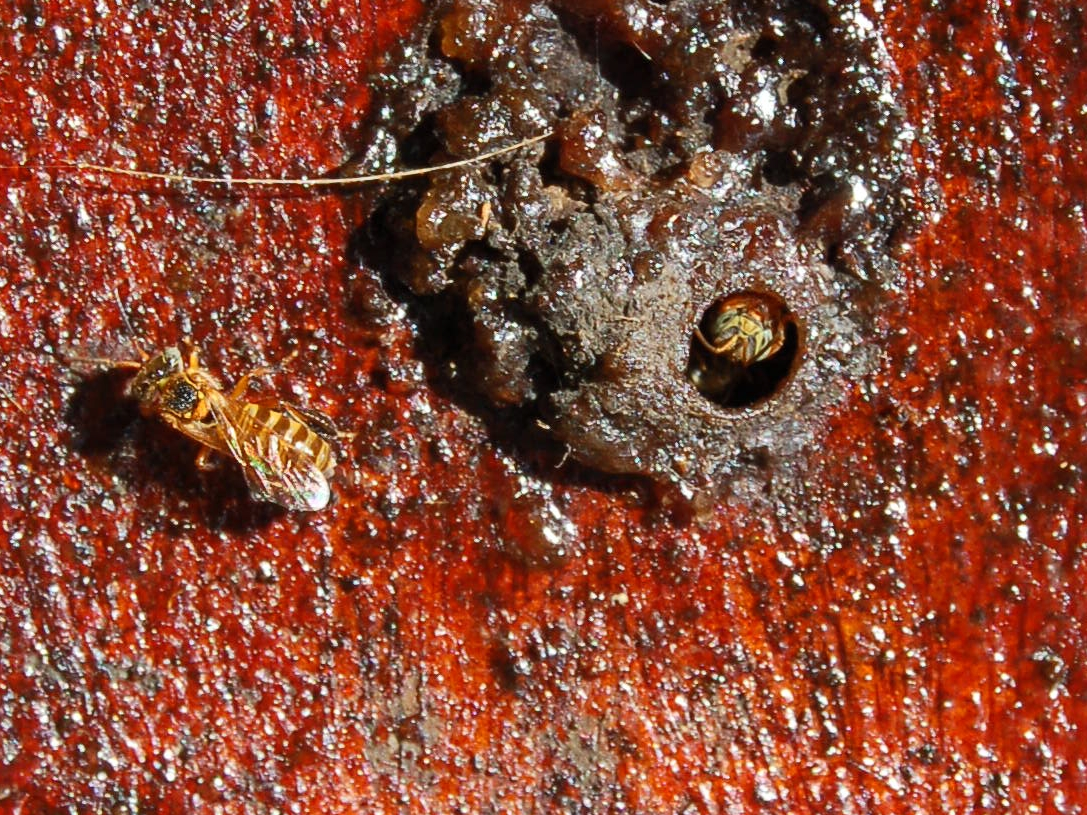
- Frieseomelitta varia

Scientific classification
- Domain: Eukaryota
- Kingdom: Animalia
- Phylum: Arthropoda
- Class: Insecta
- Order: Hymenoptera
- Family: Apidae
- Genus: Frieseomelitta
- Species: F. varia

Binomial name
- Frieseomelitta varia (Lepeletier, 1836)

= Frieseomelitta varia =

Species of bee

Frieseomelitta varia, commonly known as the abelha marmelada-amarela (Brazilian Portuguese: "yellow marmalade bee"), is a species of eusocial stingless bee in the family Apidae and tribe Meliponini. F. varia is native to Brazil.

== Chemical Communication ==
In social insects, chemical communication is the most evolved form of communication. The chemicals produced for this type of communication are called hydrocarbons, that come from cuticular lipids. These chemicals produce can communicate certain things such as age, sex, reproductive status, caste, and which colony the individual is from. F. varia have 15 glands on their legs, some of which are thought to be used to produce pheromones.

=== Nest-mate recognition ===
Worker bees, called guards, protect their nest and colony from any individual that does not belong to said colony, called non-nestmates. Through olfactory senses and cuticular lipids produced by F. varia, guard nests are able to differentiate and either accept or reject individuals. However, this was shown to work best on older non-nestmate individuals. Newly emerged worker bees do produce a specific hydrocarbon based on which colony they emerged from. Since these worker bees are freshly emerged, there has not been enough time passed for them to start producing the same chemicals as the rest of their colony and therefore, the guard bees are not able to differentiate between newly emerged nestmates and non-nestmates.

=== Sex identification ===
There is a difference in the number and chemical makeup of the hydrocarbons in worker and male bees. Young worker bees have fewer chemical compounds than males of the same age. Young bees also have more short alkane compounds. However, as the bees age, the worker bees have a higher diversity of chemical compounds compared to males of equal age. Based on the different chemical compounds found in the different sexes and age groups, it is believed that F. varia bees can recognize the sex and age of another bee.

=== Queen recognition ===
Queen bees have an entirely different chemical make up from the worker and male bees. It has been shown that virgin queen bees and physogastric queens have different chemical compounds that are produced. Physogastric queens have a higher presence of pentacosane compared to any other bee (worker, male, or virgin queen bees). Having a different chemical make up from the worker bees may indicate that this allows for worker-queen interactions to take place. The worker bees will be able to pick up on the pheromones the queen is releasing and begin the processes that help the queen with oviposition and provisioning.

== Morphology ==
=== Female reproductive organs ===
While there is no difference in external anatomy of queen bees to worker bees, during the pupal phase queen bee reproductive organs develop where the worker bee reproductive organs do not. In the female worker bees, the ovarioles are prearranged to go through a process of cell death, leaving the worker bees sterile.

== Pollen Collection ==
F. varia are found in urban environments as the resources they require are available here. These bees are able to use the urban environments to gain access to many different species of flowering plants. However, many worker bees generally collected from three species of flowering plants, Delonix regia, Poincianella pluviosa, and Ceiba speciosa.

== Future Research ==
There is still a lot that can and should be learned about Frieseomellita varia. However, there is currently no feasible way to rear worker bees in a laboratory setting. It has been shown that the propolis from F. varia was able to inhibit bacteria growth in a laboratory setting. This finding has potential to adding to our pharmaceutical industry producing an antibiotic that can help fight bacterias such as Aeromonas hydrophila, Bacillus subtilis, Pseudomonas aeruginosa, and Staphylococcus aureus.

== Citizen Science ==
If you, or anyone you know, have observed one of these bees, you can upload photos of your observation to iNaturalist.
