= Nora FitzGibbon =

New Zealand nurse (1889–1979)

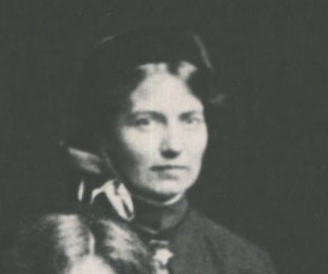
- Nora FitzGibbon in the First Contingent of New Zealand Army Nurses, First World War
- Born: Hanorah Philomena FitzGibbon; 19 March 1889; Arrow Junction, Central Otago
- Died: 7 May 1979 (aged 90)
- Occupation: Nurse

Hanorah Philomena FitzGibbon MBE (Nora, 19 March 1889–7 May 1979) was a New Zealand civilian and military nurse, hospital matron and nursing administrator.

== Early life ==
FitzGibbon was born in Arrow Junction, Central Otago, New Zealand on 19 March 1889. She was the fourth of nine children of farmers Edmond FitzGibbon and Mary, née Lynch. She attended school at the Arrowtown convent and at St. Patrick's School in Dunedin.

== Career ==
At the age of 16, FitzGibbon joined her sister Mary as a nurse aide at Seacliff Mental Hospital, near Dunedin. She became acquainted with the medical superintendent, Truby King, and his wife Bella and was inspired to train as a Karitane nurse when they opened their Karitane Home for Babies in 1907. She later moved to Christchurch for nursing training and became a registered nurse in 1913 and a sister in 1914.

In February 1915 she joined a group of 11 other New Zealand nurses who were sent to Egypt with the Australian Army Nursing Service. The nurses travelled to Melbourne first, and then in April 1915 left for Suez. FitzGibbon nursed at base hospitals in Egypt and in France, and on an ambulance train near the front line.

After World War I she returned to Christchurch and completed training in midwifery, and then returned to Dunedin's Karitane Hospital to train as a Plunket nurse and Sanitary Inspector. She was appointed matron of Karitane in 1926, however the following year she resigned to nurse her mother until her mother's death in 1930.

From 1930 to 1934 FitzGibbon was matron of the Auckland Karitane Hospital, after which she became the Nursing Advisor for the Plunket Society in Dunedin. In this role she travelled extensively throughout New Zealand, visiting and advising Plunket nurses and assisting branches to develop. In 1939 she was appointed an MBE.

She officially retired in 1945, although she continued several active roles in nursing: she was national president of the New Zealand Registered Nurses Association from 1946 to 1949, honorary secretary of the New Zealand Nurses Memorial Fund from 1949 to 1967 and founding president of the Catholic Women's League in Dunedin from 1949 to 1955. In 1937 she founded the Dunedin Catholic Nurses' Guild, and in 1956 she was elected the inaugural president of the national organisation.

FitzGibbon collaborated with Dr Helen Deem, the Plunket Society's medical advisor, to develop and co-write a manual for New Zealand mothers. Titled Modern Mothercraft: A Guide for Parents, it was first published in 1945, and reprinted nineteen times over subsequent years. It included advice on raising babies and small children, and featured the first standard growth chart for New Zealand babies, which was the result of studying around 9,000 babies.
