= Henry Scotland =

New Zealand politician

Hon. Henry Scotland M.L.C.
- Born: 11 July 1821; Muswell Hill, London, England
- Died: 27 July 1910 (aged 89); Wellington, New Zealand
- Known for: Member of New Zealand Legislative Council
- Relatives: Will Scotland (son)

Henry Scotland (11 July 1821 – 27 July 1910) was an English-born member of the New Zealand Legislative Council from 24 February 1868 until his death on 27 July 1910.

== Early life ==
Scotland was born in Muswell Hill, London, the fourth son of George Scotland, Chief Justice of Trinidad, and Sarah Humphrys. He was educated at Merchant Taylors School, matriculated at St John's College, Oxford in 1840, and was called to the bar at the Middle Temple in 1849. He emigrated to New Zealand in 1850 on the Eden.

== New Zealand career ==
Scotland initially settled in New Plymouth, where he practised law. Following his appointment to the Legislative Council in 1868, Scotland stood for Maori land rights, civil liberties, the preservation of native bush, and the peaceful settlement of international differences. Historian Dick Scott remarks that these concerns "put him light-years ahead of time in nineteenth-century New Zealand". In the 1880s, Scotland moved to Pahi in the Northland Region.

== Personal life ==
Scotland was married three times; his first two wives predeceased him. His first marriage was to Sarah Biggs (c. 1817–1887), whom he married in London in 1842. In 1889, he married Mary Ann Spriggs (1861–1896), with whom he had two sons. He was survived by his third wife, Margaret Venning (c. 1847–1916), whom he married in 1898. (Note: Scott (1999) incorrectly states that the two sons were from Scotland's third marriage.)

His younger son, Will Scotland, became a noted aviator.

== Death ==
Scotland died in Wellington on 27 July 1910, aged 89. He is interred at Auckland's Purewa Cemetery.

== Publications ==
- The New-Zealander on London Bridge, or, Moral ruins of the modern Babylon (1878)
- Denominationalism: The Bane of Christianity – Two Letters to a Friend in the Country (1888)
